= Stonewall Book Award =

LGBT literary award

- Stonewall Book Award seal
- Awarded for: "exceptional merit relating to the LGBTQIA+ experience"
- Description: annual award for English-language LGBTQIA+ literature, primarily published in the U.S.
- Country: United States
- Presented by: the Rainbow Round Table (RRT) of the American Library Association (ALA)
- Formerly called: Gay Book Award; Gay, Lesbian, Bisexual, and Transgender Book Award
- First award: 1971
- Website: ala.org/rt/rrt/award/stonewall and two "homepages" (Note: Online the American Library Association presents the three Stonewall Book Awards twice, once in a GLBTRT subsite and once in an Awards subsite. The former treats them as three tracks of one award; the latter presents two Stonewall Book Awards for literature and nonfiction (adult books) and another one in parallel for children's and young adults books. References to both sets of webpages are provided here.)

The Stonewall Book Award is a set of three literary awards that annually recognize "exceptional merit relating to the LGBTQIA+ experience" in English-language books, primarily focusing on those published in the U.S. As of 2026, the award categories are the Barbara Gittings Literature Award, Israel Fishman Non-Fiction Award, and Mike Morgan and Larry Romans Children's and Young Adult Literature Award. They are sponsored by the Rainbow Round Table (RRT) of the American Library Association (ALA).

The Stonewall Book Award began as the Gay Book Award in 1971, when the Rainbow Round Table was a grassroots group called the Task Force on Gay Liberation. The program has been an official American Library Association award since 1986. Barbara Gittings and Israel Fishman were founding members of the Task Force on Gay Liberation, with Fishman serving as the group's first coordinator, and Gittings making their first bibliography of gay-positive literature. Mike Morgan and Larry Romans were partners and longtime supporters of the awards.

Finalists for each category of the Stonewall Book Award have been publicly designated since 1990, and termed "Honor Books" from 2001. As of 2026, separate panels of librarians judge books for the awards: they select the winning book for each category and choose which honor books to name from the semi-finalists. The winners are announced in January and each receives a plaque and $1000 cash prize during the ALA Annual Conference in June or July. Winners are expected to attend and to give acceptance speeches.

The Stonewall Book Award is one of a number of LGBTQ literary awards. Other prominent awards include the Lambda Literary Awards, Publishing Triangle Awards, and Gaylactic Spectrum Awards.

== Submissions ==
The ALA solicits book suggestions each to be accompanied by a brief statement in favor of the book. Anyone may suggest a title for consideration. However, the publisher of a proposed title, agents or representatives of the author, or anyone else who may stand to gain directly from the nomination of the book should disclose this information via the online form.

Eligible books should be original works published in the U.S. and Canada during the preceding year, including "substantially changed new editions" and "English-language translations of foreign-language books".

== History ==
The Gay Book Award was inaugurated in 1971 at the ALA annual meeting in Dallas, Texas, by the newly created Task Force on Gay Liberation (TFGL). The ceremony, attended by only 9 people, recognized Patience and Sarah, a historical novel by Alma Routsong (writing as Isabel Miller), which had been self-published by Routsong in 1969. A "grassroots acknowledgment" of GLBT publishing, there were "only a handful" of books to consider annually. The ALA officially started granting the award in 1986, and by 1995, there were more than 800 books considered for the award.

In 2002, the awards, then two, were jointly named after the site of the 1969 Stonewall riots as well as two of the founding members of the TFGL, Barbara Gittings and Israel Fishman.

=== Award name and categories ===
- 1971–1986 Gay Book Award
- 1987–1989 Gay and Lesbian Book Award
- 1990–1993 Gay and Lesbian Book Award (nonfiction and literature categories)
- 1994–1998 Gay, Lesbian, and Bisexual Book Award (nonfiction and literature)
- 1999–2001 Gay, Lesbian, Bisexual, and Transgender Book Award (nonfiction and literature)
- 2002–2010 Stonewall Book Award-Barbara Gittings Literature Award and the Stonewall Book Award-Israel Fishman Non-Fiction Award.
- 2010–present Stonewall Book Award-Barbara Gittings Literature Award, the Stonewall Book Award-Israel Fishman Non-Fiction Award, and the Stonewall Book Award-Mike Morgan and Larry Romans Children's & Young Adult Literature Award.

From 1986, the Gay Book Award and its descendants have been part of the American Library Association awards program, now termed ALA Book, Print & Media Awards.

== Recipients ==
Stonewall Book Awards Winners
Year	Category	Recipient	Title	Citation
1971		Isabel Miller	Patience and Sarah	Winner
1972		Peter Fisher	The Gay Mystique: The Myth and Reality of Male Homosexuality	Winner
1972		Del Martin and Phyllis Lyon	Lesbian/Woman	Winner
1974		Jeannette Howard Foster	Sex Variant Women in Literature: A Historical and Quantitative Survey	Winner
1975		Jonathan Ned Katz (ed.)	Homosexuality: Lesbians and Gay Men in Society, History, and Literature	Winner
1977		Howard Brown	Familiar Faces, Hidden Lives: The Story of Homosexual Men in America Today	Winner
1978		Ginny Vida (ed.)	Our Right to Love: A Lesbian Resource Book	Winner
1979		Betty Fairchild and Nancy Hayward	Now That You Know: What Every Parent Should Know About Homosexuality	Winner
1980		Winston Leyland (ed.)	Now the Volcano: An Anthology of Latin American Gay Literature	Winner
1981		John Boswell	Christianity, Social Tolerance, and Homosexuality: Gay People in Western Europe from the Beginning of the Christian Era to the Fourteenth Century	Winner
1981		Audre Lorde	The Cancer Journals	Winner
1982		Lillian Faderman	Surpassing the Love of Men: Romantic Friendship and Love Between Women from the Renaissance to the Present	Winner
1982		J. R. Roberts	Black Lesbians: An Annotated Bibliography	Winner
1982		Vito Russo	The Celluloid Closet: Homosexuality in the Movies	Winner
1984		John D'Emilio	Sexual Politics, Sexual Communities: The Making of a Homosexual Minority in the United States, 1940-1970	Winner
1985		Judy Grahn	Another Mother Tongue: Gay Words, Gay Worlds	Winner
1986		Cindy Patton	Sex and Germs: The Politics of AIDS	Winner
1987		Walter Williams	The Spirit and the Flesh: Sexual Diversity in American Indian Culture	Winner
1988		Joan Nestle	A Restricted Country	Winner
1988		Randy Shilts	And the Band Played On: Politics, People, and the AIDS Epidemic	Winner
1989		Alan Hollinghurst	The Swimming Pool Library	Winner
1989		Sarah Schulman	After Delores	Winner
1990	Non-fiction	Neil Miller	In Search of Gay America: Women and Men in a Time of Change	Winner
1990	Non-fiction	Susan and Daniel Cohen	When Someone You Know Is Gay	Finalist
1990	Non-fiction	Martin Duberman, Martha Vicinus, and George Chauncey, Jr. (eds.)	Hidden from History: Reclaiming the Gay and Lesbian Past	Finalist
1990	Non-fiction	Lesbian History Group	Not a Passing Phase: Reclaiming Lesbians in History 1840-1985	Finalist
1990	Non-fiction	John Preston (ed.)	Personal Dispatches: Writers Confront AIDS	Finalist
1990	Literature	David B. Feinberg	Eighty-Sixed	Winner
1990	Literature	Christopher Bram	In Memory of Angel Clare	Finalist
1990	Literature	Edith Konecky	A Place at the Table	Finalist
1990	Literature	David Leavitt	Equal Affections	Finalist
1990	Literature	Carolyn Weathers and Jenny Wrenn (eds.)	In a Different Light: An Anthology of Lesbian Writers	Finalist
1991	Non-fiction	Wayne Dynes (ed.)	Encyclopedia of Homosexuality	Winner
1991	Non-fiction	Allan Berube	Coming Out Under Fire: The History of Gay Men and Women in World War Two	Finalist
1991	Non-fiction	Cal Gough and Ellen Greenblatt (eds.)	Gay and Lesbian Library Service	Finalist
1991	Non-fiction	Bret Hinch	Passions of the Cut Sleeve: The Male Homosexual Tradition in China	Finalist
1991	Non-fiction	Mary Ann Humphrey	My Country, My Right to Serve: Experiences of Gay Men and Women in the Military, World War II to the Present	Finalist
1991	Non-fiction	Janice E. Rench	Understanding Sexual Identity: A Book for Gay Teens and Their Friends	Finalist
1991	Non-fiction	Stuart Timmons	The Trouble with Harry Hay: Founder of the Modern Gay Movement	Finalist
1991	Non-fiction	Bonnie Zimmerman	The Safe Sea of Women: Lesbian Fiction 1969-1989	Finalist
1991	Literature	Minnie Bruce Pratt	Crime Against Nature	Winner
1991	Literature	Michael Cunningham	A Home at the End of the World	Finalist
1991	Literature	John Gilgun	Music I Never Dreamed of	Finalist
1991	Literature	David Leavitt	A Place I've Never Been	Finalist
1991	Literature	Paula Martinac	Out of Time	Finalist
1991	Literature	Matthew Stadler	Landscape: Memory	Finalist
1992	Non-fiction	Lillian Faderman	Odd Girls and Twilight Lovers: A History of Lesbian Life in Twentieth-Century America	Winner
1992	Non-fiction	Sandra Butler and Barbara Rosenblum	Cancer in Two Voices	Finalist
1992	Non-fiction	Gary David Comstock	Violence against Lesbians and Gay Men	Finalist
1992	Non-fiction	Martin Duberman	Cures: A Gay Man's Odyssey	Finalist
1992	Non-fiction	Will Roscoe	The Zuni Man-Woman	Finalist
1992	Non-fiction	Lindsy Van Gelder and Pamela Robin Brandt	Are You Two ...Together?: A Gay and Lesbian Travel Guide to Europe	Finalist
1992	Literature	Paul Monette	Halfway Home	Winner
1992	Literature	Sara Levi Calderon	The Two Mujeres	Finalist
1992	Literature	Essex Hemphill (ed.)	Brother to Brother: New Writings by Black Gay Men	Finalist
1992	Literature	Karen Lee Osborne (ed.)	Hawkwings	Finalist
1992	Literature	Jacquelyn Holt Park	A Stone Gone Mad	Finalist
1992	Literature	Adrienne Rich	An Atlas of the Difficult World: Poems 1988-1991	Finalist
1992	Literature	Assotto Saint (ed.)	The Road Before Us: 100 Gay Black Poets	Finalist
1992	Literature	Makeda Silvera (ed.)	Piece of My Heart: A Lesbian of Colour Anthology	Finalist
1992	Literature	Tom Spanbauer	The Man Who Fell in Love with the Moon	Finalist
1993	Non-fiction	Eric Marcus	Making History: The Struggle for Gay and Lesbian Equal Rights, 1945-1990	Winner
1993	Non-fiction	Betty Berzon	Positively Gay: New Approaches to Lesbian and Gay Life	Finalist
1993	Non-fiction	Jeanne DuPrau	The Earth House	Finalist
1993	Non-fiction	Paul Monette	Becoming a Man: Half a Life Story	Finalist
1993	Non-fiction	Rictor Norton	Mother Clap's Molly House: The Gay Subculture in England, 1700-1830	Finalist
1993	Non-fiction	John Preston (ed.)	A Member of the Family: Gay Men Write about Their Families	Finalist
1993	Literature	Essex Hemphill	Ceremonies: Prose and Poetry	Winner
1993	Literature	Christopher Bram	Almost History	Finalist
1993	Literature	Stephen McCauley	The Easy Way Out	Finalist
1993	Literature	Karen Kringle	Vital Ties	Finalist
1993	Literature	Jeanette Winterson	Written on the Body	Finalist
1994	Non-fiction	Phyllis Burke	Family Values: Two Moms and Their Son	Winner
1994	Non-fiction	Martin Duberman	Stonewall	Finalist
1994	Non-fiction	Julia Penelope and Susan J. Wolfe (eds.)	Lesbian Culture: An Anthology	Finalist
1994	Non-fiction	April Martin	The Lesbian and Gay Parenting Handbook: Creating and Raising Our Families	Finalist
1994	Non-fiction	William B. Rubenstein	Lesbians, Gay Men and the Law	Finalist
1994	Literature	Leslie Feinberg	Stone Butch Blues	Winner
1994	Literature	Claudia Allen	She's Always Liked the Girls Best	Finalist
1994	Literature	Fenton Johnson	Scissors, Paper, Rock	Finalist
1994	Literature	Cherrie Moraga	The Last Generation	Finalist
1994	Literature	Bennett L. Singer (ed.)	Growing up Gay: A Literary Anthology	Finalist
1995	Non-fiction	Dorothy Allison	Skin: Talking About Sex, Class And Literature	Winner
1995	Non-fiction	Philip Sherman and Samuel Bernstein	Uncommon Heroes: A Celebration of Heroes and Role Models for Gay and Lesbian Americans	Winner
1995	Non-fiction	George Chauncey	Gay New York: Gender, Urban Culture, and the Makings of the Gay Male World, 1890-1940	Finalist
1995	Non-fiction	Raymond Murray	Images in the Dark: An Encyclopedia of Gay and Lesbian Film and Video	Finalist
1995	Non-fiction	Joan Nestle and John Preston (eds.)	Sister and Brother: Lesbians and Gay Men Write about Their Lives Together	Finalist
1995	Literature	Marion Dane Bauer	Am I Blue? Coming Out from the Silence	Winner
1995	Literature	Rafael Campo	The Other Man Was Me: A Voyage to the New World	Finalist
1995	Literature	Lillian Faderman (ed.)	Chloe Plus Olivia: An Anthology of Lesbian and Bisexual Literature from the Seventeenth Century to the Present	Finalist
1995	Literature	Ellen Galford	The Dyke and the Dybbuk	Finalist
1995	Literature	Marilyn Hacker	Winter Numbers: Poems	Finalist
1996	Non-fiction	Urvashi Vaid	Virtual Equality: The Mainstreaming of Gay and Lesbian Liberation	Winner
1996	Non-fiction	Linnea Due	Joining the Tribe: Growing Up Gay & Lesbian in the '90s	Finalist
1996	Non-fiction	Jonathan Ned Katz	The Invention of Heterosexuality	Finalist
1996	Non-fiction	Minnie Bruce Pratt	S/HE	Finalist
1996	Non-fiction	Claude J. Summers (ed.)	The Gay and Lesbian Literary Heritage	Finalist
1996	Literature	Jim Grimsley	Dream Boy	Winner
1996	Literature	Dorothy Allison	Two or Three Things I Know for Sure	Finalist
1996	Literature	Francesca Lia Block	Baby Be-Bop	Finalist
1996	Literature	Howard Cruse	Stuck Rubber Baby	Finalist
1996	Literature	Reynolds Price	The Promise of Rest	Finalist
1997	Non-fiction	Fenton Johnson	Geography of the Heart	Winner
1997	Non-fiction	Edward Alwood	Straight News: Gays, Lesbians and the News Media	Finalist
1997	Non-fiction	Ellen Bass and Kate Kaufman	Free Your Mind: The Book for Gay, Lesbian and Bisexual Youth -- and Their Allies	Finalist
1997	Non-fiction	Mark Doty	Heaven's Coast	Finalist
1997	Non-fiction	David Tuller	Cracks in the Iron Closet: Travels in Gay and Lesbian Russia	Finalist
1997	Literature	Emma Donoghue	Hood	Winner
1997	Literature	Andrew Holleran	The Beauty of Men	Finalist
1997	Literature	Shyam Selvadurai	Funny Boy	Finalist
1997	Literature	Sarah Van Arsdale	Toward Amnesia	Finalist
1997	Literature	Terry Wolverton	Bailey's Beads	Finalist
1998	Non-fiction	Adam Mastoon	The Shared Heart: Portraits and Stories Celebrating Lesbian, Gay, and Bisexual Young People	Winner
1998	Non-fiction	Amy Hoffman	Hospital Time	Finalist
1998	Non-fiction	Susan Raffo	Queerly Classed	Finalist
1998	Non-fiction	James T. Sears	Lonely Hunters: An Oral History of Lesbian and Gay Southern Life, 1948-1968	Finalist
1998	Non-fiction	Arlene Stein	Sex and Sensibility: Stories of a Lesbian Generation	Finalist
1998	Literature	Lucy Jane Bledsoe	Working Parts	Winner
1998	Literature	Persimmon Blackbridge	Prozac Highway	Finalist
1998	Literature	Elana Dykewomon	Beyond the Pale	Finalist
1998	Literature	Scott Heim	In Awe	Finalist
1998	Literature	Judith Katz	The Escape Artist	Finalist
1999	Non-fiction	Sarah Schulman	Stagestruck: Theater, AIDS, and the Marketing of Gay America	Winner
1999	Non-fiction	Pat Griffin	Strong Women, Deep Closets: Lesbians and Homophobia in Sport	Finalist
1999	Non-fiction	John Loughery	The Other Side of Silence: Men's Lives and Gay Identities, a Twentieth Century History	Finalist
1999	Non-fiction	Joan Nestle	A Fragile Union: New & Selected Writings	Finalist
1999	Non-fiction	Barbara Smith	The Truth That Never Hurts: Writings on Race, Gender, and Freedom	Finalist
1999	Literature	Michael Cunningham	The Hours	Winner
1999	Literature	Nicola Griffith and Stephen Pagel	Science Fiction	Finalist
1999	Literature	Carol Guess	Switch	Finalist
1999	Literature	Mark Merlis	An Arrow's Flight	Finalist
1999	Literature	Pamela Sneed	Imagine Being More Afraid of Freedom Than Slavery: Poems	Finalist
2000	Non-fiction	Barrie Jean Borich	My Lesbian Husband: Landscape of a Marriage	Winner
2000	Non-fiction	John-Manuel Andriote	Victory Deferred: How AIDS Changed Gay Life in America	Finalist
2000	Non-fiction	Bruce Bagemihl	Biological Exuberance: Animal Homosexuality and Natural Diversity	Finalist
2000	Non-fiction	Mark Doty	Firebird	Finalist
2000	Non-fiction	Leslie Stainton	Lorca: A Dream of Life	Finalist
2000	Literature	Marci Blackman	Po Man's Child	Winner
2000	Literature	Jim Grimsley	Comfort & Joy	Finalist
2000	Literature	Robin Lippincott	Mr. Dalloway	Finalist
2000	Literature	Paul Lisicky	Lawnboy	Finalist
2000	Literature	Marvin K. White	Last Rights: Poems	Finalist
2001	Non-fiction	William N. Eskridge	Gaylaw: Challenging the Apartheid of the Closet	Winner
2001	Non-fiction	Frances Ann Day	Lesbian and Gay Voices: An Annotated Bibliography and Guide to Literature for Children and Young Adults	Honor
2001	Non-fiction	Beth Loffreda	Losing Matt Shepard: Life and Politics in the Aftermath of Anti-gay Murder	Honor
2001	Non-fiction	William Murray	Janet, My Mother, and Me of Growing Up with Janet Flanner and Natalia Danesi Murray	Honor
2001	Non-fiction	Judd Winick	Pedro and Me: Friendship, Loss, and What I Learned	Honor
2001	Literature	Sarah Waters	Affinity	Winner
2001	Literature	Michael Downing	Breakfast with Scot	Honor
2001	Literature	David Ebershoff	The Danish Girl	Honor
2001	Literature	Michael Lassell and Elena Georgiou (eds.)	The World in Us: Lesbian and Gay Poetry of the Next Wave: An Anthology	Honor
2001	Literature	Armistead Maupin	The Night Listener: A Novel	Honor
2002	Non-fiction	Barry Werth	The Scarlet Professor: Newton Arvin, a Literary Life Shattered by Scandal	Winner
2002	Non-fiction	Louise A. Blum	You're Not from Around Here, Are You? A Lesbian in Small-Town America	Honor
2002	Non-fiction	Joyce Murdoch and Deb Price	Courting Justice: Gay Men and Lesbians v. the Supreme Court	Honor
2002	Non-fiction	Kirk Read	How I Learned to Snap: A Small-Town Coming-Out and Coming-of-Age Story	Honor
2002	Non-fiction	Arlene Stein	The Stranger Next Door: The Story of a Small Community's Battle over Sex, Faith, and Civil Rights	Honor
2002	Non-fiction	Edmund White with The Estate Project for Artists with AIDS (eds.)	Loss within Loss: Artists in the Age of AIDS	Honor
2002	Literature	Moisés Kaufman and Tectonic Theatre Project	The Laramie Project	Winner
2002	Literature	Sylvia Brownrigg	Pages for You	Honor
2002	Literature	Bernard Cooper	Guess Again: Short Stories	Honor
2002	Literature	John Sam Jones	Welsh Boys Too	Honor
2002	Literature	JT LeRoy	The Heart Is Deceitful Above All Things	Honor
2003	Non-fiction	Joanne Meyerowitz	How Sex Changed: A History of Transsexuality in the United States	Winner
2003	Non-fiction	Noelle Howey	Dress Codes: of three girlhoods-- My Mothers, My Father's and Mine	Honor
2003	Non-fiction	Neil Miller	Sex Crime Panic: A Journey to the Paranoid Heart of the 1950s	Honor
2003	Non-fiction	Carmen L. Oliveria, translated by Niel K. Besner	Rare and Commonplace Flowers: The Story of Elizabeth Bishop and Lota de Macedo Soares	Honor
2003	Non-fiction	Jerry Roscoe	Glenway Wescott Personally	Honor
2003	Literature	Noel Alumit	Letters to Montgomery Clift	Winner
2003	Literature	Jeffrey Eugenides	Middlesex	Honor
2003	Literature	Ronald Frame	The Lantern Bearers	Honor
2003	Literature	Jamie O'Neill	At Swim, Two Boys	Honor
2003	Literature	Sarah Waters	Fingersmith	Honor
2004	Non-fiction	John D'Emilio	Lost Prophet: The Life and Times of Bayard Rustin	Winner
2004	Non-fiction	Andrew Wilson	Beautiful Shadow: A Life of Patricia Highsmith	Honor
2004	Non-fiction	Vern L. Bullough (ed.)	Before Stonewall: Activists for Gay and Lesbian Rights in Historical Context	Honor
2004	Non-fiction	Lois W. Banner	Intertwined Lives: Margaret Mead, Ruth Benedict, and their Circle	Honor
2004	Non-fiction	David Kaufman	Ridiculous!: The Theatrical Life and Times of Charles Ludlam	Honor
2004	Literature	Monique Truong	The Book of Salt	Winner
2004	Literature	Louise Welsh	Cutting Room	Honor
2004	Literature	Julie Anne Peters	Keeping You a Secret	Honor
2004	Literature	Christopher Bram	Lives of the Circus Animals	Honor
2004	Literature	Nina Revoyr	Southland	Honor
2005	Non-fiction	Joan Roughgarden	Evolution's Rainbow: Diversity, Gender, and Sexuality in Nature and in People	Winner
2005	Non-fiction	Patrick Moore	Beyond Shame: Reclaiming the Abandoned History of Radical Gay Sexuality	Honor
2005	Non-fiction	Douglas Crase	Both: a Portrait in Two Parts	Honor
2005	Non-fiction	David Sedaris	Dress Your Family in Corduroy and Denim	Honor
2005	Non-fiction	Alexis De Veaux	Warrior Poet: A Biography of Audre Lorde	Honor
2005	Literature	Colm Tóibín	The Master	Winner
2005	Literature	Doug Wright	I Am My Own Wife	Honor
2005	Literature	Alan Hollinghurst	The Line of Beauty	Honor
2005	Literature	Julie Anne Peters	Luna	Honor
2005	Literature	Stacey D'Erasmo	A Seahorse Year	Honor
2006	Non-fiction	Joshua Gamson	The Fabulous Sylvester: the Legend, the Music, the 70s in San Francisco	Winner
2006	Non-fiction	Tania Katan	My One-Night Stand with Cancer	Honor
2006	Non-fiction	Matt Houlbrook	Queer London: Perils and Pleasures in the Sexual Metropolis, 1918-1957	Honor
2006	Non-fiction	Neil McKenna	The Secret Life of Oscar Wilde	Honor
2006	Non-fiction	Larry Kramer	The Tragedy of Today's Gays	Honor
2006	Literature	Abha Dawesar	Babyji	Winner
2006	Literature	Keith McDermott	Acqua Calda	Honor
2006	Literature	Barry McCrea	The First Verse	Honor
2006	Literature	Richard McCann	Mother of Sorrows	Honor
2006	Literature	Sam D'Allesandro, edited by Kevin Killian	The Wild Creatures: Collected Stories of Sam D'Allesandro	Honor
2007	Non-fiction	Alison Bechdel	Fun Home: A Family Tragicomic	Winner
2007	Non-fiction	Kenji Yoshino	Covering: The Hidden Assault on Our Civil Rights	Honor
2007	Non-fiction	David Eisenbach	Gay Power: An American Revolution	Honor
2007	Non-fiction	William Benemann	Male-Male Intimacy in Early America: Beyond Romantic Friendships	Honor
2007	Non-fiction	Kevin Jennings	Mama's Boy, Preacher's Son	Honor
2007	Literature	Andrew Holleran	Grief	Winner
2007	Literature	Christian Burch	The Manny Files	Honor
2007	Literature	Sarah Waters	The Night Watch	Honor
2007	Literature	Michelle Tea	Rose of No Man's Land	Honor
2007	Literature	Martin Hyatt	A Scarecrow's Bible	Honor
2008	Non-fiction	Mark Doty	Dog Years	Winner
2008	Non-fiction	Cris Beam	Transparent: Love, Family, and Living the T with Transgender Teenagers	Honor
2008	Non-fiction	Stephen Pascal (ed.)	The Grand Surprise: The Journals of Leo Lerman	Honor
2008	Non-fiction	Janet Malcolm	Two Lives: Gertrude and Alice	Honor
2008	Non-fiction	Kevin Sessums	Mississippi Sissy	Honor
2008	Literature	Ellis Avery	The Teahouse Fire	Winner
2008	Literature	Ivan E. Coyote	Bow Grip	Honor
2008	Literature	Samuel R. Delany	Dark Reflections	Honor
2008	Literature	David Leavitt	The Indian Clerk: A Novel	Honor
2008	Literature	Ali Liebegott	The IHOP Papers	Honor
2009	Non-fiction	William N. Eskridge	Dishonorable Passions: Sodomy Laws in America, 1861-2003	Winner
2009	Non-fiction	Bob Morris	Assisted Loving: True Tales of Double Dating with My Dad	Honor
2009	Non-fiction	Joanne Passet	Sex Variant Woman: The Life of Jeannette Howard Foster	Honor
2009	Non-fiction	E. Patrick Johnson	Sweet Tea: Black Gay Men of the South	Honor
2009	Non-fiction	Joel Derfner	Swish: My Quest to Become the Gayest Person Ever	Honor
2009	Literature	Evan Fallenberg	Light Fell	Winner
2009	Literature	Joseph Olshan	The Conversion	Honor
2009	Literature	Alain Claude Sulzer	A Perfect Waiter	Honor
2009	Literature	Emma Donoghue	The Sealed Letter	Honor
2010	Non-fiction	Nathaniel Frank	Unfriendly Fire: How the Gay Ban Undermines the Military and Weakens America	Winner
2010	Non-fiction	Stuart E. Weisberg	Barney Frank: The Story of America's Only Left-Handed, Gay, Jewish Congressman	Honor
2010	Non-fiction	Nkunzi Zandile Nkabinde	Black Bull, Ancestors and Me	Honor
2010	Non-fiction	James Davidson	The Greeks and Greek Love: A Radical Reappraisal of Homosexuality in Ancient Greece	Honor
2010	Non-fiction	Rudolph P. Byrd (ed.)	I Am Your Sister: Collected and Unpublished Writings of Audre Lorde	Honor
2010	Literature	David Francis	Stray Dog Winter	Winner
2010	Literature	James Hannaham	God Says No	Honor
2010	Literature	Mario Bellatin	Beauty Salon	Honor
2010	Children's & Young Adult	Nick Burd	The Vast Fields of Ordinary	Winner
2010	Children's & Young Adult	Marcus Ewert	10,000 Dresses	Honor
2010	Children's & Young Adult	Lesléa Newman	Daddy, Papa, and Me	Honor
2010	Children's & Young Adult	Linas Alsenas	Gay America: Struggle for Equality	Honor
2010	Children's & Young Adult	Lesléa Newman	Mommy, Mama, and Me	Honor
2010	Children's & Young Adult	Dale Peck	Sprout	Honor
2011	Non-fiction	Emma Donoghue	Inseparable: Desire Between Women in Literature	Winner
2011	Non-fiction	Stuart Biegel	The Right to Be Out: Sexual Orientation and Gender Identity in America's Public Schools	Honor
2011	Non-fiction	Wendy Moffat	A Great Unrecorded History: A New Life of E. M. Forster	Honor
2011	Non-fiction	Patti Smith	Just Kids	Honor
2011	Non-fiction	Justin Spring	Secret Historian: The Life and Times of Samuel Steward, Professor, Tattoo Artist, and Sexual Renegade	Honor
2011	Literature	Barb Johnson	More of This World or Maybe Another	Winner
2011	Literature	Tom Mendicino	Probation	Honor
2011	Literature	Michael Sledge	The More I Owe You	Honor
2011	Literature	Zoe Whittall	Holding Still for as Long as Possible	Honor
2011	Children's & Young Adult	Brian Katcher	Almost Perfect	Winner
2011	Children's & Young Adult	John Green and David Levithan	Will Grayson, Will Grayson	Honor
2011	Children's & Young Adult	Davida Wills Hurwin	Freaks and Revelations	Honor
2011	Children's & Young Adult	James Klise	Love Drugged	Honor
2011	Children's & Young Adult	David Walliams, illustrated by Quentin Blake	The Boy in the Dress	Honor
2012	Non-fiction	Jonathan D. Katz and David C. Ward	Hide/Seek: Difference and Desire in American Portraiture	Winner
2012	Non-fiction	Michael Bronski	A Queer History of the United States (Revisioning American History)	Winner
2012	Non-fiction	Nick Krieger	Nina Here Nor There: My Journey Beyond Gender	Honor
2012	Non-fiction	Ivan E. Coyote and Zena Sharman (eds.)	Persistence: All Ways Butch and Femme	Honor
2012	Non-fiction	Wanda M. Corn and Tirza True Latimer	Seeing Gertrude Stein: Five Stories	Honor
2012	Non-fiction	Oscar Wilde and Nicholas Frankel (ed.)	The Picture of Dorian Gray: An Annotated, Uncensored Edition	Honor
2012	Literature	Wayne Hoffman	Sweet Like Sugar	Winner
2012	Literature	Jon Marans	The Temperamentals: A New Play	Honor
2012	Literature	Bob Smith	Remembrance of Things I Forgot	Honor
2012	Literature	Kathleen Winter	Annabel	Honor
2012	Literature	Oscar Wilde and Nicholas Frankel (ed.)	The Picture of Dorian Gray: An Annotated, Uncensored Edition	Honor
2012	Children's & Young Adult	Bil Wright	Putting Makeup on the Fat Boy	Winner
2012	Children's & Young Adult	Lili Wilkinson	Pink	Honor
2012	Children's & Young Adult	Brian Farrey	With or Without You	Honor
2012	Children's & Young Adult	Ilike Merey	a + e 4ever	Honor
2012	Children's & Young Adult	Paul Yee	Money Boy	Honor
2013	Non-fiction	Keith Boykin	For Colored Boys Who Have Considered Suicide When the Rainbow is Still Not Enough: Coming of Age, Coming Out, and Coming Home	Winner
2013	Non-fiction	Christopher Bram	Eminent Outlaws: The Gay Writers Who Changed America	Honor
2013	Non-fiction	Jeanne Cordova	When We Were Outlaws of Love & Revolution	Honor
2013	Non-fiction	Mattilda Bernstein Sycamore (ed.)	Why Are Faggots So Afraid of Faggots?: Flaming Challenges to Masculinity, Objectification, and the Desire to Conform	Honor
2013	Non-fiction	Jeanette Winterson	Why Be Happy When You Could Be Normal?	Honor
2013	Literature	Ellis Avery	The Last Nude	Winner
2013	Literature	John Boyne	The Absolutist	Honor
2013	Literature	Madeline Miller	The Song of Achilles	Honor
2013	Literature	Charles Rice-González	Chulito	Honor
2013	Literature	Paul Russell	The Unreal Life of Sergey Nabokov	Honor
2013	Children's & Young Adult	Benjamin Alire Sáenz	Aristotle and Dante Discover the Secrets of the Universe	Winner
2013	Children's & Young Adult	Raina Telgemeier	Drama	Honor
2013	Children's & Young Adult	Hannah Moskowitz	Gone, Gone, Gone	Honor
2013	Children's & Young Adult	Lesléa Newman	October Mourning: A Song for Matthew Shepard	Honor
2013	Children's & Young Adult	S. J. Adams	Sparks: The Epic, Completely True Blue, (Almost) Holy Quest of Debbie	Honor
2014	Non-fiction	Lori Duron	Raising My Rainbow: Adventures in Raising a Fabulous, Gender Creative Son	Winner
2014	Non-fiction	David McConnell	American Honor Killings: Desire and Rage Among Men	Winner
2014	Non-fiction	R.B. Parkinson	A Little Gay History: Desire and Diversity Across the World	Honor
2014	Non-fiction	Alysia Abbott	Fairyland of my Father	Honor
2014	Literature	Hilary Sloin	Art on Fire	Winner
2014	Literature	Jon Marans	A Strange and Separate People	Honor
2014	Literature	Benjamin Alire Sáenz	Everything Begins and Ends at the Kentucky Club	Honor
2014	Literature	William Klaber	The Rebellion of Miss Lucy Ann Lobdell	Honor
2014	Children's & Young Adult	Kirstin Cronn-Mills	Beautiful Music for Ugly Children	Winner
2014	Children's & Young Adult	e.E. Charlton-Trujillo	Fat Angie	Winner
2014	Children's & Young Adult	Tim Federle	Better Nate Than Ever	Honor
2014	Children's & Young Adult	Ken Setterington	Branded by the Pink Triangle	Honor
2014	Children's & Young Adult	David Levithan	Two Boys Kissing	Honor
2015	Non-fiction	Scott Kugle	Living Out Islam: Voices of Gay, Lesbian, and Transgender Muslims	Winner
2015	Non-fiction	Robert Beachy	Gay Berlin	Honor
2015	Non-fiction	Janet Mock	Redefining Realness: My Path to Womanhood, Identity, Love & So Much More	Honor
2015	Non-fiction	Martin Duberman	Hold Tight Gently: Michael Callen, Essex Hemphill, and the Battlefield of AIDS	Honor
2015	Non-fiction	Rachel Hope Cleves	Charity & Sylvia: A Same-Sex Marriage in Early America	Honor
2015	Literature	Saeed Jones	Prelude to Bruise	Winner
2015	Literature	Tatamkhulu Afrika	Bitter Eden	Honor
2015	Literature	Emma Donoghue	Frog Music	Honor
2015	Literature	David Leavitt	The Two Hotel Francforts	Honor
2015	Literature	Jo Walton	My Real Children	Honor
2015	Children's & Young Adult	Gayle E. Pitman	This Day in June	Winner
2015	Children's & Young Adult	Susan Kuklin	Beyond Magenta: Transgender Teens Speak Out	Honor
2015	Children's & Young Adult	Jandy Nelson	I'll Give You the Sun	Honor
2015	Children's & Young Adult	Christine Baldacchio, illustrated by Isabelle Malenfant	Morris Micklewhite and the Tangerine Dress	Honor
2016	Non-fiction	Kenji Yoshino	Speak Now: Marriage Equality on Trial	Winner
2016	Non-fiction	Amy Ellis Nutt	Becoming Nicole: The Transformation of an American Family	Honor
2016	Non-fiction	Lillian Faderman	The Gay Revolution: The Story of the Struggle	Honor
2016	Non-fiction	Michael Helquist	Marie Equi: Radical Politics and Outlaw Passions	Honor
2016	Non-fiction	Doug Meyer	Violence Against Queer People: Race, Class, Gender, and the Persistence of Anti-LGBT Discrimination	Honor
2016	Literature	Carolina de Robertis	The Gods of Tango	Winner
2016	Literature	Virginie Despentes	Apocalypse Baby	Honor
2016	Literature	Leah Horlick	For Your Own Good	Honor
2016	Literature	LaShonda Katrice Barnett	Jam On The Vine	Honor
2016	Literature	Libby Ware	Lum	Honor
2016	Children's & Young Adults	Alex Gino	Melissa	Winner
2016	Children's & Young Adults	Bill Konigsberg	The Porcupine of Truth	Winner
2016	Children's & Young Adults	Cory Silverberg and Fiona Smyth	Sex is a Funny Word: a Book about Bodies, Feelings, and YOU	Honor
2016	Children's & Young Adults	Christopher Barzak	Wonders of the Invisible World	Honor
2017	Non-fiction	David France	How to Survive a Plague: The Inside Story of How Citizens and Science Tamed AIDS	Winner
2017	Non-fiction	Kevin J. Mumford	Not Straight, Not White: Black Gay Men from the March on Washington to the AIDS Crisis	Honor
2017	Non-fiction	Michael Schreiber	One-Man Show: The Life and Art of Bernard Perlin	Honor
2017	Non-fiction	Annika Butler-Wall, Kim Cosier, et al. (eds.)	Rethinking Sexism, Gender, and Sexuality	Honor
2017	Non-fiction	Ivan E. Coyote	Tomboy Survival Guide	Honor
2017	Literature	Chris McCormick	Desert Boys	Winner
2017	Literature	Martin Hyatt	Beautiful Gravity	Honor
2017	Literature	Bryan Borland	Dig	Honor
2017	Literature	Saleem Haddad	Guapa	Honor
2017	Literature	Matthew Griffin	Hide	Honor
2017	Children's & Young Adult	Rick Riordan	Magnus Chase and the Gods of Asgard: The Hammer of Thor	Winner
2017	Children's & Young Adult	Meredith Russo	If I Was Your Girl	Winner
2017	Children's & Young Adult	Anna-Marie McLemore	When the Moon Was Ours	Honor
2017	Children's & Young Adult	Jenny Downham	Unbecoming	Honor
2017	Children's & Young Adult	Robin Stevenson	Pride: Celebrating Diversity & Community	Honor
2018	Non-fiction	John Chaich and Todd Oldham	Queer Threads: Crafting Identity and Community	Winner
2018	Non-fiction	C. Riley Snorton	Black on Both Sides: A Racial History of Trans Identity	Honor
2018	Non-fiction	Andrew Evans	The Black Penguin	Honor
2018	Non-fiction	Bennett Singer and David Deschamps	LGBTQ Stats: Lesbian, Gay, Bisexual, Transgender, and Queer People by the Numbers	Honor
2018	Literature	Cat Fitzpatrick and Casey Plett (eds.)	Meanwhile, Elsewhere: Science Fiction and Fantasy from Transgender Writers	Winner
2018	Literature	SJ Sindu	Marriage of a Thousand Lies	Honor
2018	Literature	Kai Cheng Thom	A Place Called No Homeland	Honor
2018	Literature	Rivers Solomon	An Unkindness of Ghosts	Honor
2018	Literature	Chen Chen	When I Grow Up, I Want to be a List of Further Possibilities	Honor
2018	Children's & Young Adult	Dashka Slater	The 57 Bus: A True Story of Two Teenagers and the Crime That Changed Their Lives	Winner
2018	Children's & Young Adult	Brandy Colbert	Little & Lion	Winner
2018	Children's & Young Adult	Melanie Gillman	As the Crow Flies	Honor
2018	Children's & Young Adult	Mackenzi Lee	The Gentleman's Guide to Vice and Virtue	Honor
2019	Literature	Rebecca Makkai	The Great Believers	Winner
2019	Literature	Lisa Maas	Forward	Honor
2019	Literature	Carole Maurel, adapted by Mariko Tamaki	Luisa: Now and Then	Honor
2019	Literature	Uzodinma Iweala	Speak No Evil	Honor
2019	Literature	Amy Bloom	White Houses	Honor
2019	Non-fiction	Michael Amherst	Go the Way Your Blood Beats	Winner
2019	Non-fiction	E. Patrick Johnson	Black. Queer. Southern. Women: An Oral History	Honor
2019	Non-fiction	Eric and Stephani Lohman	Raising Rosie: Our Story of Parenting an Intersex Child	Honor
2019	Non-fiction	Robert W. Fieseler	Tinderbox: The Untold Story of the Up Stairs Lounge Fire and the Rise of Gay Liberation	Honor
2019	Non-fiction	Isaac Butler and Dan Kois	The World Only Spins Forward: The Ascent of Angels in America	Honor
2019	Children's & Young Adult	Jessica Love	Julian is a Mermaid	Winner
2019	Children's & Young Adult	Kacen Callender	Hurricane Child	Winner
2019	Children's & Young Adult	Ashley Herring Blake	Ivy Aberdeen's Letter to the World	Honor
2019	Children's & Young Adult	Kelly Loy Gilbert	Picture Us in the Light	Honor
2020	Non-fiction	Saeed Jones	How We Fight for Our Lives	Winner
2020	Non-fiction	Maia Kobabe	Gender Queer	Honor
2020	Non-fiction	Kai Cheng Thom	I Hope We Choose Love: A Trans Girl's Notes from the End of the World	Honor
2020	Non-fiction	Carmen Maria Machado	In the Dream House	Honor
2020	Non-fiction	Robyn Ryle	She/He/They/Me: For the Sisters, Misters, and Binary Resisters	Honor
2020	Literature	Carolina de Robertis	Cantoras	Winner
2020	Literature	Bryan Washington	Lot: Stories	Honor
2020	Literature	Ocean Vuong	On Earth We're Briefly Gorgeous	Honor
2020	Literature	Nicole Dennis-Benn	Patsy	Honor
2020	Literature	Hasan Namir	War/Torn	Honor
2020	Children's & Young Adult	Kyle Lukoff	When Aidan Became a Brother	Winner
2020	Children's & Young Adult	Dean Atta	The Black Flamingo	Winner
2020	Children's & Young Adult	Akwaeke Emezi	Pet	Honor
2020	Children's & Young Adult	Abdi Nazemian	Like a Love Story	Honor
2020	Children's & Young Adult	Maulik Pancholy	The Best At It	Honor
2021	Non-fiction	Bonnie Ruberg	Queer Games Avant-Garde: How LGBTQ Game Makers are Reimagining the Medium of Video Games	Winner
2021	Non-fiction	Jenn Shapland	My Autobiography of Carson McCullers	Honor
2021	Non-fiction	Molly Wizenberg	The Fixed Stars: A Memoir	Honor
2021	Non-fiction	Jeffrey H. Jackson	Paper Bullets	Honor
2021	Non-fiction	Kimberly M. Zieselman	XOXY	Honor
2021	Literature	Zeyn Joukhadar	The Thirty Names of Night	Winner
2021	Literature	Akwaeke Emezi	The Death of Vivek Oji	Honor
2021	Literature	Bryan Washington	Memorial	Honor
2021	Literature	Kay Ulanday Barrett	More Than Organs	Honor
2021	Literature	Natalie Diaz	Postcolonial Love Poem	Honor
2021	Children's & Young Adult	Archaa Shrivastav	We Are Little Feminists: Families	Winner
2021	Children's & Young Adult	Aliza Layne	Beetle & The Hollowbones	Honor
2021	Children's & Young Adult	Adib Khorram	Darius the Great Deserves Better	Honor
2021	Children's & Young Adult	Kacen Callender	Felix Ever After	Honor
2021	Children's & Young Adult	Leah Johnson	You Should See Me in a Crown	Honor
2022	Non-fiction	Akwaeke Emezi	Dear Senthuran: A Black Spirit Memoir	Winner
2022	Non-fiction	Zoe Playdon	The Hidden Case of Ewan Forbes: And the Unwritten History of the Trans Experience	Honor
2022	Non-fiction	Laura Lee	A History of Scars	Honor
2022	Non-fiction	Sarah Schulman	Let the Record Show: A Political History of ACT UP New York, 1987-1993	Honor
2022	Non-fiction	Brian Broome	Punch Me Up to the Gods	Honor
2022	Literature	Rivers Solomon	Sorrowland	Winner
2022	Literature	Ryka Aoki	Light From Uncommon Stars	Honor
2022	Literature	Becky Chambers	A Psalm for the Wild-Built	Honor
2022	Literature	Lee Lai	Stone Fruit	Honor
2022	Literature	Jasmine Mans	Black Girl, Call Home	Honor
2022	Children's & Young Adult	Kyle Lukoff	Too Bright to See	Winner
2022	Children's & Young Adult	Malinda Lo	Last Night at the Telegraph Club	Winner
2022	Children's & Young Adult	Jake Maia Arlow	Almost Flying	Honor
2022	Children's & Young Adult	Eliot Schrefer	The Darkness Outside Us	Honor
2022	Children's & Young Adult	Harry Woodgate	Grandad's Camper	Honor
2023	Non-fiction	Cecilia Gentili	Faltas: Letters to Everyone in My Hometown Who Isn't My Rapist	Winner
2023	Non-fiction	Hugh Ryan	The Women's House of Detention: A Queer History of a Forgotten Prison	Winner
2023	Non-fiction	Sherronda J. Brown	Refusing Compulsory Sexuality: A Black Asexual Lens on Our Sex-Obsessed Culture	Honor
2023	Non-fiction	Edgar Gomez	High-Risk Homosexual	Honor
2023	Non-fiction	Lars Horn	Voice of the Fish: A Lyric Essay	Honor
2023	Literature	Rachel M. Harper	The Other Mother	Winner
2023	Literature	Rachel Wiley	Revenge Body	Winner
2023	Literature	SJ Sindu	Dominant Genes	Honor
2023	Literature	KB Brookins	How to Identify Yourself with a Wound	Honor
2023	Literature	Isaac Fellman	Dead Collections	Honor
2023	Children's	Charlotte Sullivan Wild and Charlene Chua	Love, Violet	Winner
2023	Children's	Mariama J. Lockington	In the Key of Us	Honor
2023	Children's	Hinaleimoana Wong-Kalu, Dean Hamer, Joe Wilson, and Daniel Sousa	Kapaemahu	Honor
2023	Children's	Rachel Elliott	The Real Riley Mayes	Honor
2023	Children's	Rob Kearney, Eric Rosswood, and Nidhi Chanani	Strong	Honor
2023	Young Adult	Sacha Lamb	When the Angels Left the Old Country	Winner
2023	Young Adult	Casey McQuiston	I Kissed Shara Wheeler	Honor
2023	Young Adult	R. Eric Thomas	Kings of B'more	Honor
2023	Young Adult	Cory McCarthy	Man o' War	Honor
2023	Young Adult	Jen Ferguson	The Summer of Bitter and Sweet	Honor
2024	Non-fiction	Lamya H	Hijab Butch Blues	Winner
2024	Non-fiction	Curtis Chin	Everything I Learned, I Learned in a Chinese Restaurant	Honor
2024	Non-fiction	Elyssa Maxx Goodman	Glitter and Concrete: A Cultural History of Drag in New York City	Honor
2024	Non-fiction	Matt Baume	Hi Honey, I'm Homo! Sitcoms, Specials, and the Queering of American Culture	Honor
2024	Non-fiction	Toshio Meronek and Miss Major Griffin-Gracy	Miss Major Speaks: Conversations with a Black Trans Revolutionary	Honor
2024	Literature	KB Brookins	Freedom House	Winner
2024	Literature	A. Light Zachary	More Sure	Honor
2024	Literature	Sarah Cypher	The Skin and Its Girl	Honor
2024	Literature	Sebastian Merrill	Ghost::Seeds	Honor
2024	Literature	Willie Edward Taylor Carver Jr.	Gay Poems for Red States	Honor
2024	Children's	Nora Dåsnes	Cross My Heart and Never Lie	Winner
2024	Children's	Jyoti Rajan Gopal and Svabhu Kohli (illust.)	Desert Queen	Honor
2024	Children's	Jessica Walton and Aśka (illust.)	Stars in Their Eyes	Honor
2024	Children's	Justine Pucella Winans	The Otherwoods	Honor
2024	Children's	A.M. Wild and Kah Yangni (illust.)	Not He or She, I'm Me	Honor
2024	Young Adult	Abdi Nazemian	Only This Beautiful Moment	Winner
2024	Young Adult	Andrew Joseph White	The Spirit Bares Its Teeth	Honor
2024	Young Adult	Becky Albertalli	Imogen, Obviously	Honor
2024	Young Adult	James Acker	The Long Run	Honor
2024	Young Adult	Jonny Garza Villa	Ander & Santi Were Here	Honor
2025	Non-fiction			
2025	Non-fiction	Annie Liontas	Sex With a Brain Injury: On Concussion and Recovery	Winner
2025	Non-fiction	Rae Garringer	Country Queers: A Love Letter	Honor
2025	Non-fiction	Darius Stewart	Be Not Afraid of My Body	Honor
2025	Non-fiction	Sara Glass	Kissing Girls on Shabbat	Honor
2025	Non-fiction	Nico Lang	American Teenager: How Trans Kids Are Surviving Hate and Finding Joy in a Turbulent Era	Honor
2025	Literature			
2025	Literature	Griffin Hansbury	Some Strange Music Draws Me In	Winner
2025	Literature	Alison Cochrun	Here We Go Again	Honor
2025	Literature	Justinian Huang	The Emperor and the Endless Palace	Honor
2025	Literature	Eric Schlich	Eli Harpo's Adventure to the Afterlife	Honor
2025	Poetry	torrin a. greathouse	DEED	Winner
2025	Children's			
2025	Children's	Jes and Cin Wibowo	Lunar Boy	Winner
2025	Children's	Joëlle Retener, illustrated by DeAnn Wiley	Marley's Pride	Honor
2025	Children's	Taylor Tracy	Murray Out of Water	Honor
2025	Children's	H.E. Edgmon	The Flicker	Honor
2025	Children's	Jay Leslie, illustrated by Loveis Wise	What I Must Tell the World: How Lorraine Hansberry Found Her Voice	Honor
2025	Young Adult			
2025	Young Adult	Jonny Garza Villa	Canto Contigo	Winner
2025	Young Adult	Gabe Cole Novoa	Most Ardently: A Pride and Prejudice Remix	Honor
2025	Young Adult	Jeremy Whitley, with art by Cassio Ribeiro	Navigating with You	Honor
2025	Young Adult	Rex Ogle	Road Home	Honor
2025	Young Adult	Chatham Greenfield	Time and Time Again	Honor

== See also ==
- LGBT literature
- Libraries and the LGBT community
- Lambda Literary Awards
