= Am I Blue? Coming Out from the Silence =

1995 short story collection

- First edition cover
- Editor: Marion Dane Bauer
- Publisher: HarperTeen
- Publication date: April 15, 1995
- Awards: Lambda Literary Award (1995); Stonewall Book Award (1995); Minnesota Book Award (1995)
- ISBN: 9780064405874

Am I Blue? Coming Out from the Silence is a 1995 short story collection edited by Marion Dane Bauer. Geared toward young adults, the book covers topics such as homosexuality in "entertaining, informative ways. The stories vary from fantasy to very realistic, slice of life pieces." When the book was initially published, some proceeds were donated to PFLAG.

In 1995, Am I Blue? won the Lambda Literary Award for Children's and Young Adult Literature, the American Library Association's Gay, Lesbian, and Bisexual Book Award, and the Minnesota Book Award for Older Children.

== Contents ==
- "Michael's Little Sister" by C. S. Adler
- "Dancing Backwards" by Marion Dane Bauer
- "Winnie and Tommy" by Francesca Lia Block
- "Am I Blue" by Bruce Coville
- "Parents Night" by Nancy Garden
- "Three Mondays in July" by James Cross Giblin
- "Running" by Ellen Howard
- "We Might as Well Be Strangers" by M. E. Kerr
- "Hands" by Jonathan London
- "Holding" by Lois Lowry
- "The Honorary Shepherds" by Gregory Maguire
- "Supper" by Lesléa Newman
- "50% Chance of Lightning" by Cristina Salat
- "In the Tunnels" by William Sleator
- "Slipping Away" by Jacqueline Woodson
- "Blood Sister" by Jane Yolen

== Reception ==
=== Reviews ===
Am I Blue? received starred reviews from Booklist and Kirkus Reviews.

Booklist's Stephanie Zvirin highlighted how the stories in the collection are "wonderfully diverse in tone and setting". However, Zvirin said the collection's title tale, was its "one off note", referring to it as "a campy, messagey piece". Zvirin noted that while the piece "is actually humorous as well as pointed, [it] would have been more effective had it been placed elsewhere in the collection. As leadoff to the anthology, it gives readers the impression they're in for sermons, not good storytelling, and nothing could be further from the truth". Zvirin praised Jim Giblin's "Three Mondays in July" and Lois Lowry's "Holding" as the collection's best works.

Kirkus Reviews also referred to Bruce Coville's "Am I Blue?" as "campy and humorous" while praising Francesca Lia Block's "Winnie and Teddy," Jim Giblin's "Three Mondays in July", Lois Lowry's "Holding", and Marion Dane Bauer's "Dancing Backwards". They further highlighted the blurbs authors provided following each story, which "can be as interesting as the stories themselves".

Similarly, English Journal's Lois Stover noted that "one especially notable aspect of the collection is that the authors tell the story of how they came to write the tale that 'helps break the silence'".

Publishers Weekly said the book is "honest, well-written and true to life".

Christine Jenkins, writing for School Library Journal, noted, "As is the case with most short story collections, the overall quality is uneven, but the best stories are memorable. They speak of survival and hope; they say, like the man on the beach in Giblin's story, 'You're not alone.''"

=== Controversy ===
According to the American Library Association, Am I Blue? has been frequently banned and challenged in the United States since its initial publication.

Writing about such challenges in 2002, William J. Broz pointed out in the Journal of Adolescent & Adult Literacy that it was not surprising that "a fight about a middle school library book addressing homosexuality would be politically and emotionally charged". Broz further noted the book's discussion of topics such as "social class and religion, issues about which people do not change their minds based on reasoned discussion".

=== Awards and honors ===
Awards for Am I Blue?
Year	Award	Result	Ref.
1995	ALA's Gay, Lesbian, and Bisexual Book Award	Winner	
1995	Lambda Literary Award for Children's and Young Adult Literature	Winner	
1995	Minnesota Book Award for Older Children	Winner	
