= Like a Love Story =

2019 novel by Abdi Nazemian

- Author: Abdi Nazemian
- Genre: Young adult fiction, Historical fiction
- Publisher: Balzer + Bray
- Publication date: June 4, 2019

Like a Love Story is a historical, young adult romance novel by Abdi Nazemian, published June 4, 2019 by Balzer + Bray. The story follows Reza, an Iranian boy, as he grapples with his homosexuality amid the AIDS crisis in New York City.

== Plot ==
Like a Love Story follows three main characters: Reza, Judy, and Art.

At the beginning of the story, Reza, an Iranian boy, moves to New York City from Toronto with his mother to live with his stepfather and stepbrother. Living amidst the AIDS crisis, Reza fears coming out as homosexual.

Reza quickly befriends Judy, an aspiring fashion designer, and her best friend, Art, the high school's only out and proud homosexual person. Despite Reza's immediate attraction toward Art, he begins dating Judy. Eventually, Art and Reza address their attraction, forcing Reza to come out to his family before they can become a couple.

Beyond the romance elements, Like a Love Story explores the New York City AIDS epidemic, as Judy's Uncle Steven dies from the disease, Art photographs people with AIDS, and the characters participate in ACT UP demonstrations.

== Reception ==
Like a Love Story received positive reviews from Common Sense Media and Kirkus Reviews, including starred reviews from Publishers Weekly, Quill & Quire, BookPage, and Booklist. Time magazine named it one of the best young adult novels of all time. The book also received the following accolades:

- American Library Association Best Fiction for Young Adults Top Ten (2020)
- Stonewall Book Award for Children's and Young Adult Literature Honor Book (2019)
