= Linas Alsenas =

American writer

- Born: 1979 (age 46–47); Cleveland, Ohio, U.S.
- Education: Harvard University
- Occupations: Writer, editor
- Writing career
- Period: 21st century
- Genres: Picture books, nonfiction, LGBT literature
- Notable awards: American Library Association
- Website: linasalsenas.com

Linas Alsenas (born 1979 in Cleveland, Ohio) is a gay Lithuanian-American author and book illustrator. After attending Harvard University, where he was an illustrator for the campus newspaper and received a BA in history of art and architecture, he moved to New York City and worked as an editor for Interior Design magazine and then at Abrams Books for Young Readers. In 2006, Scholastic released his first picture book, Mrs. Claus Takes a Vacation, which he wrote and illustrated. In 2007, Scholastic released Peanut, followed by Hello My Name Is Bob in 2009.

Alsenas is also the author of Gay America: Struggle For Equality, published by Amulet Books in 2008, the first gay history textbook written for teens. The book was an American Library Association's Stonewall Book Awards Children's and Young Adult Literature Award Honor Book in 2010.

Alsenas lived in Stockholm, Sweden with his husband, Jan Wilhelmsson. He moved to London in 2013 and works at Scholastic.
