= Love Drugged =

2010 young adult novel by James Klise

- Author: James Klise
- Publisher: Flux
- Publication date: September 1, 2010
- ISBN: 9780738721750

Love Drugged is a 2010 young adult novel by James Klise. The novel follows Jamie Bates, a 15-year-old who is struggling to accept his sexuality. When he hears about Rehomoline, a drug that may suppress same-sex attraction, he is intrigued and begins taking it and doesn't stop even when harmful side effects emerge.

Love Drugged was a 2010 Stonewall Book Award honor book and finalist for the 2011 Lambda Literary Award for Children's and Young Adult Literature.

== Background ==
The author of Love Drugged, James Klise, is gay and a high school librarian who has run his school's gay–straight alliance (GSA). Although his initial works did not center gay characters, he found his stories improved when he included them, given that he was writing from some of his own experiences. Love Drugged was written following reflections of conversations that occurred between students in the GSA.

== Plot ==
Love Drugged follows Jamie Bates, a 15-year-old who is struggling to accept that he is gay. He begins dating Celia Gamez and despite his best attempts, he can't handle doing anything more physical with her than a chaste kiss. He also can't force himself to be attracted to her romantically.

When Jamie learns about Rehomoline, a new, untested drug that can suppress same-sex attraction, he is so desperate to try it that he steals doses from Celia's father, who is a pharmaceutical scientist. As Jamie takes the medication, he finds that the drug succeeds in suppressing his attraction for other boys, but it doesn't increase his interest in girls, including Celia. In addition, the drug has some intense side effects, including headaches, tremors, and bloody noses.

When Jamie decides he can no longer handle the side effects, he confesses to Dr. Gamez that he stole the medication. Dr. Gamez informs Jamie that he has been a convenient test subject for the drug, and Jamie realizes how dangerous both the drug and Dr. Gamez are. Later, in an attempt to stop further testing of the drug, Jamie sets fire to Dr. Gamez's lab.

He also comes out to his friends and family, who accept him and his sexuality.

News breaks about Jamie's actions, but the media distorts the story, causing both gay and homophobic activists to protest. Following legal action, Jamie is awarded a million dollars, allowing him and his family to escape poverty.

== Reception ==
Kirkus Reviews called Love Drugged "an unfortunate return to early teen gay literature" in which "sexuality is presented as a problem, not a part of an identity". On behalf of School Library Journal, Betty S. Evans similarly noted that "although this novel tries in the end to be positive, it seems to have a 1980s mindset while writing for 21st-century teens".

Conversely, Brody Levesque, writing for LGBTQ Nation, called Love Drugged an "outstanding book", despite his typical annoyance with young adult novels. Levesque highlighted the book's "dark sense of humor" and the way it "gives readers a firsthand look at the pressures closeted gay teens can face and the lengths they might go to in order to conform with what they believe is the norm". Similarly, Lambda Literary's David Purse wrote, "One of the most accomplished aspects of this terrific debut is Klise’s portrayal of the emotions that people go through while being in the closet. The fear, the confusion and indeed the feeling of not really belonging will definitely resonate with readers who are or have been in a similar situation."

Although Levesque considered the plot "believable", School Library Journal's Betty S. Evans claimed otherwise. Michael Cart, writing for Booklist, said it was "sometimes a bit clumsy and melodramatic in its execution". Publishers Weekly agreed that "the drama that ensues is a bit far-fetched and the ending tidy".

Despite potential concerns, Publishers Weekly concluded that "Klise has created an empathetic protagonist [...] and a thoughtful story about identity, sexuality, and learning to accept oneself." Similarly, The Bulletin of the Center for Children's Books' April Spisak indicated that "it is impossible not to sympathetize with agonized Jamie". Conversely, Kirkus Reviews noted that "despite the first-person narration, Jamie never develops a personality". Spisak further indicated that "most of the side characters are flat caricatures".

Spisak also noted that the novel's premise felt like a "heavy-handed argument [...] against a drug-dependent American culture", especially given the additional subplot about Jamie's best friend, Wesley, who stops taking his medication for attention deficit hyperactivity disorder. Despite potential issues with the novel's writing, however, she concluded that "the debate over a drug that could change sexual orientation is certainly a timely one, and readers seeking a quick read that can open this discussion may find this a useful starting point".

The Horn Book Magazine also reviewed the novel.

== Awards and honors ==
In 2011, the American Library Association included Love Drugged on their 2011 Rainbow Book List.

Awards for Love Drugged
Year	Award	Result	Ref
2010	Lambda Literary Award for Children's and Young Adult Literature	Finalist	
2011	Stonewall Book Award for Children’s and Young Adult Literature	Honor	
