= Torrin A. Greathouse =

American poet and essayist

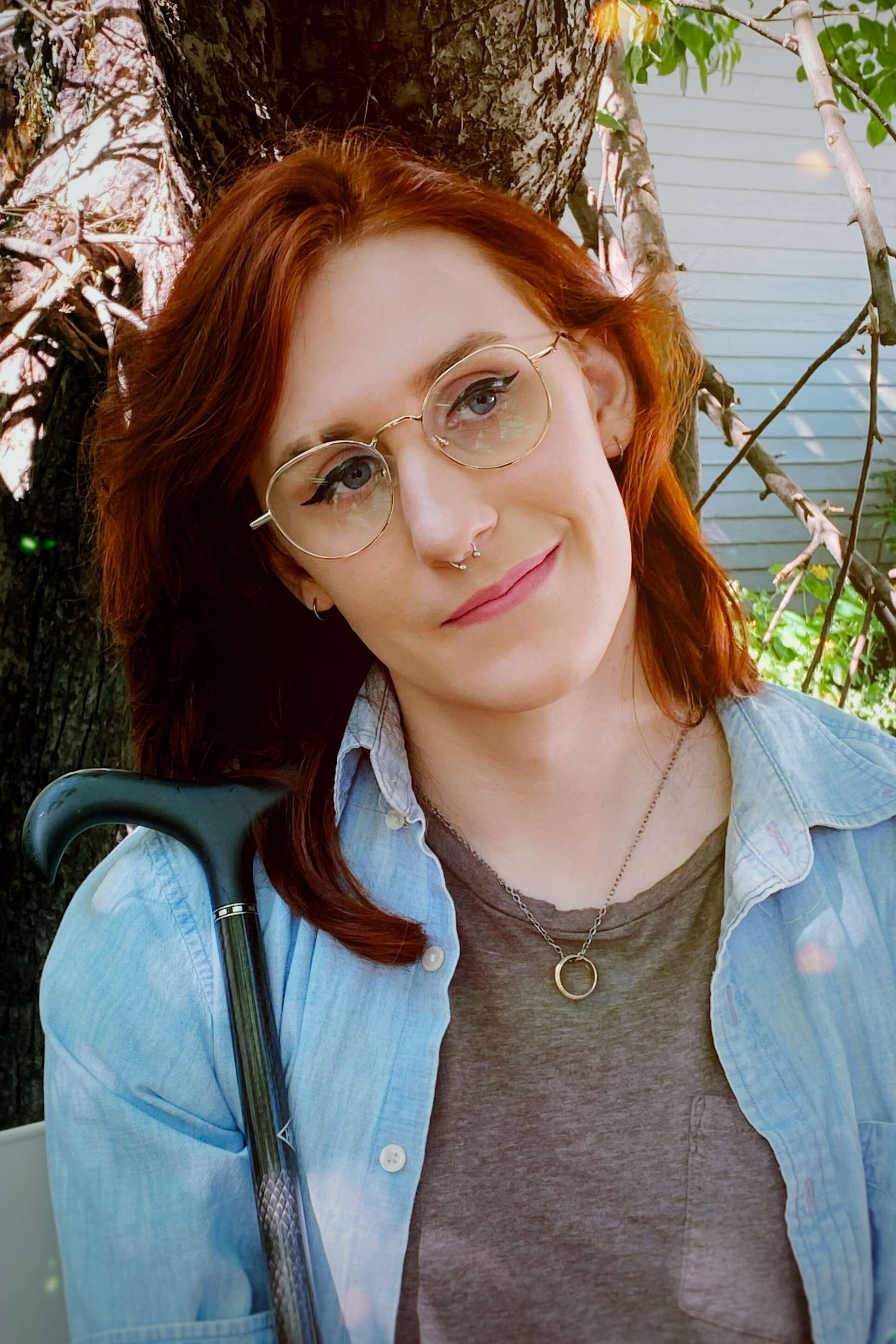
- Greathouse in 2021
- Occupation: Poet, essayist, educator
- Language: English
- Education: MFA, University of Minnesota
- Notable works: Wound from the Mouth of a Wound (2020); DEED (2024)
- Notable awards: Kate Tufts Discovery Award (2022); Stonewall Book Award—Barbara Gittings Poetry Award (2025)

Torrin A. Greathouse (stylized in all lowercase) is an American transgender poet and essayist who uses she/they pronouns. Their first poetry collection, Wound from the Mouth of a Wound, won the 2022 Kate Tufts Discovery Award, and their second collection, DEED, won the 2025 Stonewall Book Award—Barbara Gittings Poetry Award.

== Education and career ==
Greathouse is from Central California. They received an MFA in creative writing from the University of Minnesota. While at Minnesota, Greathouse's manuscript for Wound from the Mouth of a Wound was selected by Aimee Nezhukumatathil for the 2020 Ballard Spahr Prize for Poetry, which included publication by Milkweed Editions.

Greathouse teaches in the Rainier Writing Workshop at Pacific Lutheran University. Their work has appeared in publications including Poetry, The New York Times Magazine, The Kenyon Review, Foglifter, and the Academy of American Poets' Poem-a-Day series.

== Writing ==
Reviewers and interviewers have discussed Greathouse's poetry in relation to transness, disability, myth, etymology, desire, violence, and poetic form. In a 2021 interview with Blackbird, Greathouse discussed ekphrasis, etymology, and poetry's ability to examine language that has been used as a weapon. In a 2024 interview with The Rumpus, they discussed the relationship between mythology, religious language, and the body in DEED. Greathouse also told Poets & Writers that the book developed in part from an interest in etymology and inherited language.

=== Wound from the Mouth of a Wound ===
Greathouse's first full-length collection, Wound from the Mouth of a Wound, was published by Milkweed Editions in 2020. The manuscript was selected by Aimee Nezhukumatathil for the 2020 Ballard Spahr Prize for Poetry, and the book later won the 2022 Kate Tufts Discovery Award. It was also a finalist for the 2021 Minnesota Book Awards and the CLMP Firecracker Award.

In a December 2020 interview on NPR's Morning Edition, Greathouse discussed the collection in relation to transness, disability, medicalization, and the pressure placed on trans women to be beautiful. In the interview, they said that "beauty is a double bind".

Reviews also emphasized the book's attention to the body. Publishers Weekly described the collection as a debut concerned with gender, the body, and everyday violence. In Harvard Review, rl goldberg wrote that "Something gushes from each page", reading the book through recurring images of fluid, containment, and exposure. Other reviewers noted Greathouse's use of myth and formal variation, including poems involving Medusa, blackout poetry, divided text, mirror reading, and haibun.

=== DEED ===
Greathouse's second collection, DEED, was published by Wesleyan University Press in 2024. The book won the 2025 Stonewall Book Award—Barbara Gittings Poetry Award from the American Library Association.

Reviews of DEED focused on etymology, desire, disability, and the instability of language. Publishers Weekly described the book as an "unflinching exploration of the cost of desire" and noted its three-part structure, including the long central poem "I Want to Write an Honest Poem about Desire". Library Journal described the collection as centered on desire, sex, seizures, and etymology, and called Greathouse's attention to word origins one of the book's main tools. In Jacket2, Marcus Zhang discussed the book's use of dictionary entries, sonnets, sestinas, burning haibuns, and medical documents. Reviews in NewPages and Psaltery & Lyre considered the collection's treatment of queer desire and inherited systems of meaning.

== Bibliography ==
=== Poetry collections ===
- Wound from the Mouth of a Wound (Milkweed Editions, 2020)
- DEED (Wesleyan University Press, 2024)

=== Chapbooks ===
- Therǝ is a Case That I Ɐm (Damaged Goods Press, 2017)
- boy/girl/ghost (TAR Chapbook Series, 2018)

== Awards ==
Selected awards and honors
Year	Award or honor	Work	Result
2020	Ballard Spahr Prize for Poetry	Wound from the Mouth of a Wound	Won
2021	Minnesota Book Awards, poetry	Wound from the Mouth of a Wound	Finalist
2021	National Endowment for the Arts Creative Writing Fellowship, poetry	—	Fellow
2022	Kate Tufts Discovery Award	Wound from the Mouth of a Wound	Won
2022	Ruth Lilly and Dorothy Sargent Rosenberg Poetry Fellowship	—	Finalist
2025	Stonewall Book Award—Barbara Gittings Poetry Award	DEED	Won
2025	Writing Freedom Fellowship	—	Fellow
