= Michael Amherst =

English writer and literary critic

- Education: The King's School, Gloucester; Exeter College, Oxford; UEA Creative Writing Course
- Writing career
- Notable awards: Israel Fishman Non-Fiction Award (2019)
- Website: michaelamherst.com

Michael Amherst is an English writer and literary critic. He is the author of Go The Way Your Blood Beats (2018) and The Boyhood of Cain (2025).

== Early life and education ==
Amhert grew up in Tewkesbury. He completed his sixth form at The King's School, Gloucester, graduated from Exeter College, Oxford, and received a Master of Arts from the UEA Creative Writing Course. As of 2019, he was a PhD candidate in fiction at Birkbeck, University of London.

== Career ==
Amherst began his career working with British and American organizations supporting prison reform, including the American non-profit Just Detention International.

He published his first book, Go The Way Your Blood Beats: On Truth, Bisexuality and Desire, with Repeater Books in 2018. Through a mixture of essays and memoir, the book explores bisexuality. Go the Way Your Blood Beats won the 2019 Israel Fishman Non-Fiction Award.

Amherst's debut novel, The Boyhood of Cain, is a literary fiction novel published in 2025 by Faber & Faber (UK) and Riverhead Books (US). Set in England in the 1990s, the novel centres Daniel, a 12-year-old boy who is often too sickly to attend school, despite his father being headmaster of a prep school. His mother experiences depression, and his father spends nights at the local pub. After his father retires earlier than expected, the family moves to the countryside, where Daniel attends schools and befriends Philip. Meanwhile, the art teacher Mr. Miller sways between kind words and cruelty toward Daniel, and talks to the children about "sex appeal" in art. The Boyhood of Cain was well received by critics, including starred reviews from Booklist and Kirkus Reviews. Booklist's Michael Cart called Daniel "an unfailingly fascinating, memorable character". Michael Donkor, writing for The Guardian described the book's style as "unusual, crisp and finely calibrated". Publishers Weekly highlighted how "Amherst writes with a measured pace and careful attention to his youthful protagonist's malleability as Daniel questions his sexuality and other supposed binaries of life".

== Publications ==
- Go The Way Your Blood Beats: On Truth, Bisexuality and Desire. Repeater. 2018. ISBN 978-1-910-92471-6.
- The Boyhood of Cain. Faber/Riverhead. 2025. ISBN 978-0-593-71852-0.
