= Edith Konecky =

American feminist novelist (1922–2019)

- Born: Edith Rubin; August 1, 1922; New York City, U.S.
- Died: March 28, 2019 (aged 96)
- Education: New York University; Columbia University
- Occupation: Novelist
- Spouse: Murray L. Konecky (m. 1944; div. 1963)
- Children: 2
- Parent(s): Harry Rubin; Elizabeth Smith Rubin

Edith Konecky (August 1, 1922 – March 28, 2019) was a Jewish American feminist novelist whose work explored identity, sexuality, family memory and the experience of growing up in a Jewish immigrant milieu. Returning to education in her late thirties, she graduated from Columbia University and soon became a Yaddo fellow, beginning a long association with major American artists’ colonies.

== Early life and education ==
Konecky was born Edith Rubin on August 1, 1922, in Brooklyn, New York, the daughter of Harry and Elizabeth Smith Rubin. Konecky has an older brother, Martin. Harry's father had escaped the pogroms in Eastern Europe, immigrating to the United States, where he became a prosperous dress manufacturer. Elizabeth's mother, Ida Berlin, ran away from her family in Kiev at a very young age because she was promised to be married to someone she did not like, ending up in New York. She was, perhaps, the most important influence on Edith as she was growing up. Elizabeth's father, Max Shmitoff, later changed to Smith at Ellis Island, was said to have pulled a Cossack off his horse during a pogrom at their Jewish village near Minsk, in Belarus, killing him with his own sword.

She returned to school at age 37, in 1961, graduating from Columbia University.

== Career ==
Even as she entered into her life as a suburban mother in the 1950s, Konecky did not stop writing, using her daily experiences as fodder for her short stories.

One year after graduating from Columbia University, Konecky received a Yaddo fellowship. She continued to win fellowships to Yaddo throughout the late 1960s and late 1970s.

During the 1960s and into the 1970s, Konecky published several short stories and then in 1976, her widely acclaimed first novel, Allegra Maud Goldman. Konecky began writing Allegra while at the MacDowell colony in 1962.

The image of her father — a distant, driven character — featured prominently in both Allegra and Konecky's later novel, A Place at the Table. Allegra is a coming-of-age work that chronicles the growth of a young female artist. In brilliantly comic, deceptively simple vignettes, Konecky depicts the world of a nouveau riche Jewish American family in the early part of the 20th century. In her later novel, A Place at the Table (1989 & 2000), Konecky explores similar territory through the eyes of an older, more experienced heroine, Rachel. This novel also deals with Konecky's sexuality. A Place at the Table was a finalist for the 1990 Stonewall Book Award.

Konecky's more recent works are a collection of short stories, Past Sorrows and Coming Attractions (2002) and a novel, View to the North (2004).

== Personal life ==
In 1944, Edith Rubin married Murray L. Konecky and together they had two children, Michael and Joshua. Konecky and her husband divorced in 1963 and by the time Allegra appeared, Konecky came out as a lesbian.

== Awards and honors ==
- Wurlitzer Foundation fellowship, 1974
- New York Foundation of the Arts Fellow, 1992

== Works ==
- Fiction and the Facts of Life (2011) Maplewood, N.J.: Hamilton Stone Editions. ISBN 9780980178678
- Love and Money (2006) Maplewood, N.J.: Hamilton Stone Editions. ISBN 9780971487369
- View to the North (2004) Maplewood, N.J.: Hamilton Stone Editions. ISBN 9780971487338
- Past Sorrows and Coming Attractions (2000) Maplewood, N.J.: Hamilton Stone Editions. ISBN 9780965404341
- A Place at the Table (1989) New York: Random House. ISBN 9780394575223
- Allegra Maud Goldman (1976) New York: Harper & Row. ISBN 9780060124526
