= David Kaufman (author) =

American writer and theatre critic

David A. Kaufman is an American writer and theatre critic, based in New York City.

Kaufman's book on Doris Day, Doris Day: The Untold Story of the Girl Next Door, ISBN 1-905264-30-5 was published on June 10, 2008, by Virgin Books. The book was excerpted, in an article titled "Doris Day's Vanishing Act", in the May 2008 issue of Vanity Fair. Kaufman interviewed more than 175 people in the course of his research.

Kaufman's previous work, about the American playwright Charles Ludlam was Ridiculous!: The Theatrical Life and Times of Charles Ludlam (2002) ISBN 1-55783-588-8. It was a 2004 Stonewall Honor Book in Non-Fiction. His subsequent biography is Some Enchanted Evenings: The Glittering Life and Times of Mary Martin (2016) ISBN 9781250031754 (hardcover); ISBN 978125003176 (e-book)

Kaufman has been covering the theater in New York since 1981. A former theater critic for the New York Daily News, he is also a long-time contributor to the Nation, Vanity Fair, the Village Voice and the New York Times. His biography of Mary Martin, Some Enchanted Evenings: The Glittering Life and Times of Mary Martin is published by St. Martin's Press (2016).
