= Picture Us In The Light =

Novel by Kelly Loy Gilbert

- Cover of the first edition
- Author: Kelly Loy Gilbert
- Cover artist: Maria Elias; Adams Carvalho
- Language: English
- Genre: Young adult Contemporary
- Publisher: Disney Hyperion
- Publication date: April 10, 2018
- Publication place: United States
- ISBN: 978-1-4847-3528-2

Picture Us In The Light is a young adult novel by Kelly Loy Gilbert, published by Hyperion in 2018. It follows the story of Daniel Cheng, a Chinese-American high school student whose life is uprooted after he discovers secrets that his immigrant parents have been hiding all his life.

The book discusses various social issues, such as illegal immigration, adoption, sexuality, and the struggles of first-generation American families. It switches between first and second person perspectives between chapters, especially towards the end of the narrative.

Gilbert has stated that the book, which took her three years to write, was inspired by her own childhood in Cupertino and the prominent Asian community in the Bay Area. Picture Us In The Light was one of the recipients of the Stonewall Book Award in 2019, earning an honor for children's and young adult literature.

== Reception ==
Picture Us In The Light received generally positive reviews, with Kirkus Reviews calling it “Exquisite, heartbreaking, unforgettable—and, ultimately, uplifting.” Commentators praised it for not shying away from heavy topics such as mental health struggles and the reality of living in a hyper-competitive environment. Criticism for the book mainly revolved around its pacing, and the ambiguous ending. It was also praised for its accuracy in characterization, particularly that of the main character.
