= Morris Micklewhite and the Tangerine Dress =

2014 picture book by Christine Baldacchino

- First edition cover
- Author: Christine Baldacchino
- Illustrator: Isabelle Malenfant
- Language: English
- Genre: Children's literature
- Publisher: Groundwood Books
- Publication date: May 1, 2014
- Publication place: Canada
- Pages: 32pp
- ISBN: 9781554983476
- OCLC: 860349195

Morris Micklewhite and the Tangerine Dress is a 2014 Canadian picture book written by Christine Baldacchino and illustrated by Isabelle Melenfant. The book centers on Morris, a young boy who loves wearing a tangerine-colored dress from his classroom's dress up center, and follows his emotional journey as he faces teasing and exclusion from his classmates before ultimately winning them over with his imagination. Through the book's focus on Morris's inner world, his love of art, pretend play, and sensory experiences, the story emphasizes that he is a complex child whose identity extends far beyond his clothing choices. The book is widely regarded as a sensitive and reassuring story about gender nonconformity, self-expression, and the emotional impact of bullying, while also highlighting imagination as a powerful coping mechanism to bullying. The work has been used in classrooms and libraries as a tool for opening conversations about gender roles, empathy, and inclusion, often helping young readers reflect on their own behavior. At the same time, the book has been the subject of censorship debates, particularly regarding its placement in children's literature, reflecting broader conversations about gender identity and access to inclusive literature.

== Background ==
Morris Micklewhite and the Tangerine Dress was published in May 2014, and is one of several picture books to emerge in the early 2010s addressing gender non-conforming children. Similar titles in this category include My Princess Boy and Jacob's New Dress, all of which offer support and understanding to children who are exploring their gender identity, specifically gender non-conforming boys. This book also shares thematic similarity to Elena's Serenade, a story that has also been used to open classroom conversations about gender. Morris Micklewhite and the Tangerine Dress features children from various ethnic backgrounds and notably does not include a father figure, making it a useful text for teaching children about individuality and being non-judgmental across diverse family structures.

== Plot and analysis ==
Morris is a multi-faceted character who enjoys a wide range of activities, including painting, puzzles, drinking apple juice, singing, running around outside, and pretending to be an astronaut. His favorite item at school is the tangerine-colored dress from the dress up center. He loves it because it reminds him of tigers, the sun, and his mother's hair. When his classmates tease him and insist that dresses are only for girls, Morris is excluded and ostracized, ultimately pretending to have a stomach ache one lonely Friday to avoid school altogether. At home, supported by his mother, he reads, dreams and paints a wild adventure featuring blue elephants in spaceships. When Morris brings his new safari painting to school and is again being refused to see his classmates' imaginary spaceship, he builds his own, and courageously hangs the painting on his front. His classmates follow him on an imaginary journey to a planet they have never visited before, and come to the realization that it does not matter whether astronauts wear dresses.

A key part of the book's message is its portrayal of Morris as far more than a child who wears a dress: he is presented as complex, imaginative, undefined by many traits beyond his own choice of clothing. The story shows that being excluded is deeply painful, in a way that prompts young readers to reflect on their own behavior toward peers who are different. Creativity and imagination are represented as healthy coping mechanisms for dealing with social exclusion and difficult emotions. The book's gentle non-preachy tone has been noted as making its message feel naturally accessible rather than didactic.

== Genre and style ==
This book is a picture book that combines poetic onomatopoeic language with richly texted textured illustrations. Malenfant's illustrations were created using charcoal, watercolor and other mixed media, allowing readers to witness the full emotional journey of Morris, his joy, his hurt, and the comfort he finds at home with his mother. A notable stylistic feature is Baldacchino's use of sound to bring the dress to life on the page: the swishing of the fabric as Morris walks, the crinkling as he sits, and the clicking of his favorite shoes on the floor. This is achieved through the pairing of melon fonts, smudging of glowing orange pastel with Baldacchino's onomatopoeic descriptions, which together allow readers to see, hear, and almost feel the dress through the page. The illustrations are lively and colorful, and clearly depict Morris's emotional struggles and inner world. The warm, dream-like quality of the artwork has been particularly effective at capturing both Morris's vulnerability in the vibrancy of his imagination.

== Reception ==
The book received broadly positive reviews from children's literature publications upon its release. Kirkus Reviews praised Baldacchino for treating the controversial subject of expected gender behaviors in bullying with care and compassion, calling the book "an opportunity for a cozy read together and a lively discussion." Booklist describes the book as "sensitively depicts gender non-conforming children, offering them reassurance" and hope while introducing other children to the concept and calling it "an excellent book for discussion". Best Books for Kids and Teens called it "a sweetly told story about the courage and creativity it takes to be different." Rethinking Schools praised the book as "wonderful... for challenging gender roles and conveying the pain caused by teasing." Canadian Children's Books and News described Morris as an endearing and very imaginative character and called him a figure of great strength who has the courage to be different. It was an Honor Title for the 2015 Stonewall Book Award.

== Use in education ==
Studies of children's literature and other literacy practices have identified Morris Micklewhite and the Tangerine Dress as an example of a picture book that challenges traditional gender schemas and expectations. Scholars have noted that the story's portrayal of Morris, a boy who enjoys wearing colored dresses despite the negative attention, may encourage some children to reconsider rigid ideas about gender roles during shared reading and other educational events in the classroom. Scholars and researches have also argued that literacy events in the classroom involving books such as Morris Micklewhite and the Tangerine Dress can create opportunities for young students to talk through and negotiate gendered identities through reading, discussion, and animated retelling, although the responses can always vary depending on classroom context, age, student dynamics, etc. This book and other LGBTQ literature is also so helpful in showing students a perspective that is different than their own and allows for diverse conversations, showing students an inclusive space to all. One discussion of the book highlighted elementary students' emotional reactions to Morris' treatment in the story and connected the text to the "mirror and window" concept, in which literature allows students both to see themselves reflected and to better understand the gender and sexual experiences of their fellow students. Researchers have further argued the importance of the "Social-Emotional" value of this literature. LGBTQ-inclusive literature may contribute to a more inclusive classroom environment and also support "Social-Emotional Learning (SEL) skills " such as empathy, relationship building, and responsible decision making. Another study showed how a teacher used Morris Micklewhite and the Tangerine Dress during repeated classroom read-alouds to explain to her class the gender stereotypes that exist after a male-student was criticized after wearing nail polish. The professor used intentional discussion questions as well as the text to challenge the belittlement of femininity and the idea that boys should avoid feminine forms of expression, like wearing nail polish.

== Censorship and controversy ==
The book has been subject to censorship debates in school libraries and in public libraries in the United States. In a column for School Library Journal, librarian Pat Scales argues that moving picture books like Morris Micklewhite and I Am Jazz out of children's sections, often to avoid complaints about transgender themes, constitutes a subtle but harmful form of censorship. Scales maintained that even when books are not banned outright, hiding or relabeling them limits access and visibility which can reduce readership and stigmatize their content.

She further argued that young people being drawn to books labeled as controversial or forbidden reflects natural curiosity and independent thinking, and that educators should embrace rather than discourage this behavior as part of students' intellectual growth.
