= Meredith Russo =

21st-century American author

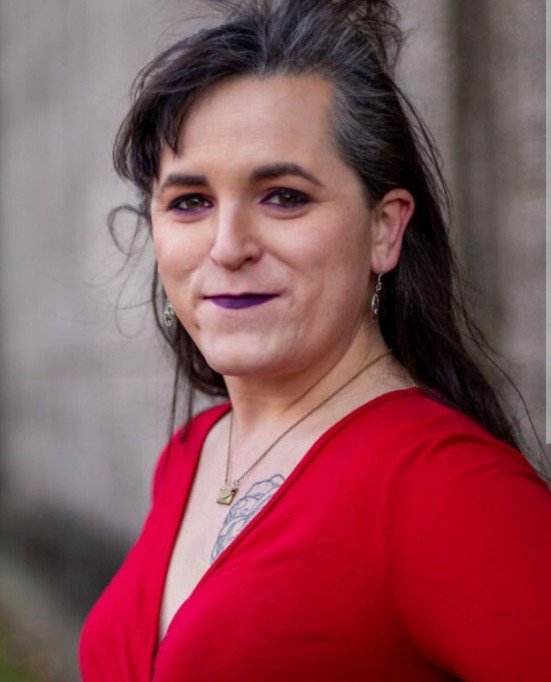
- Meredith Russo
- Occupation: Author
- Years active: 2016–present
- Notable work: If I Was Your Girl
- Awards: Stonewall Book Award (2017)

Meredith Russo (born c. 1986/1987) is an American young adult author from Chattanooga, Tennessee.

== Personal life ==
Russo is a transgender woman who transitioned in late 2013. Her debut young adult novel If I Was Your Girl is the first widely distributed young adult book about transgender teens written by a transgender woman. It was inspired by Russo's life. She wanted to write a book about a transgender character with a happy ending. In addition to her literary efforts, she campaigns heavily for HIV awareness and de-stigmatization.

== Career ==
Russo's debut young adult novel, If I Was Your Girl, published in 2016 by Flatiron Books. If I Was Your Girl is about a transgender girl going to a new school and falling in love with a boy. If I Was Your Girl won the Stonewall Book Award for the Young Adult category in 2017 and the Walter Dean Myers Award for Outstanding Children's Literature in 2017. It also received a starred review from Kirkus Reviews, Publishers Weekly, and Booklist.

Her next young adult novel, Birthday, was published by Flatiron Books in 2019 and is a follow-up to If I Was Your Girl, following two teenagers whose lives intersect starting from their 13th birthdays.

Russo also contributed several short stories and essays to anthologies published by Houghton Mifflin Harcourt, Vintage, and Algonquin.

The different characters of her stories are based on people she met during her life or from her own personal experience.

In an interview, she said that she has been inspired by a lot of comics, manga, and fiction.

== Bibliography ==
=== Novels ===
==== Young adult ====
- If I Was Your Girl (Flatiron, 2016)
- Birthday (Flatiron, 2019)

=== Short stories and essays ===
- in Radical Hope: Letters of Love and Dissent in Dangerous Times, edited by Carolina De Robertis (Vintage, 2017)
- in (Don't) Call me Crazy, edited by Kelly Jensen (Algonquin Books, 2018)
- in Meet Cute: Some People Are Destined to Meet, edited by Jennifer L. Armentrout (HMH, 2018)
- Horror Stories from Meredith Russo's website
- Meltdown from Meredith Russo's website

== Awards ==
=== Won ===
==== 2017 ====
- Stonewall Book Award in the Children's and Young Adult Literature category for If I Was Your Girl (Flatiron, 2016)
- Walter Dean Myers Award for Outstanding Children's Literature for If I Was Your Girl (Flatiron, 2016)

=== Nominations ===
==== 2017 ====
- Milwaukee County Teen Book Award Nominee for If I Was Your Girl (Flatiron, 2016)
- Lambda Literary Award for Transgender Fiction for If I Was Your Girl (Flatiron, 2016)
