= DeAnn Wiley =

American artist, illustrator and author

- Born: 1993 (age 32–33); Detroit, Michigan, U.S.
- Occupations: Artist, writer, illustrator
- Years active: 2020–present
- Awards: Stonewall Book Award 2025 for Marley's Pride
- Website: https://www.deelasheeartistry.com/

DeAnn Wiley (born 1993) is an American artist, illustrator, and author. Her work centers Black American life and Black queer women. She illustrated the books My Afro Is a Rising Sun, The Numbers Store: A Sunday Adventures Book, and Marley’s Pride, which received a Stonewall Honor. Her debut children's book Homegrown was published in 2024, followed by Double Dutch Queen in 2025.

== Life and career ==
Wiley was born and raised in Detroit, Michigan. She loved art from a young age and asked her mother to buy art supplies for her when she was in third grade.

Wiley is a self-taught artist that gained a following by posting her work to social media. She primarily paints digitally with a stylus. Her work typically depicts Black life, with an emphasis on Black queer women. One painting, "Sit Still," shows a Black mother doing her daughter's hair with iconography including a large widetoothed comb and Blue Magic hair grease. She also intentionally includes fat, dark skinned people in her work.

Wiley illustrated The Numbers Store: A Sunday Adventures Book (2023) by Harold Green III that follows a family's trip to the grocery store. In 2024 she illustrated My Afro Is a Rising Sun by Yaram Yahu. She also illustrated Marley’s Pride (2024) by Joëlle Retener, a book about a queer Black family. The book was named one of the Best Picture Books of the Year by Kirkus and received a Stonewall Honor.

Wiley's debut book as author-illustrator, Homegrown, was published in 2024 under Henry Holt and tells the story of what home means to a girl, her mother, and grandmother. It received a starred review from School Library Journal with the note, "Vibrant and hopeful, Wiley’s author-illustrator debut about a young Black girl and her loving community belongs in every collection." In 2025 she published her second children's book Double Dutch Queen that Kirkus reviewed positively as "an uplifting story brimming with warmth and the strength of familial love."

Wiley is queer.

== Books ==
=== Author-Illustrator ===
- Wiley, DeAnn (2024-01-09). Homegrown. Henry Holt and Company. ISBN 9781250365934.
- Wiley, DeAnn (2025-05-13). Double Dutch Queen. Henry Holt and Company. ISBN 9781250430533.

=== As Illustrator ===
- Green III, Harold (2023-05-02). The Numbers Store: A Sunday Adventures Book. Running Press. ISBN 9780762481583.
- Retener, Joëlle (2024-04-02). Marley's Pride. Barefoot Books. ISBN 9798888591338.
- Yahu, Yaram (2024-12-03). My Afro Is a Rising Sun. Running Press. ISBN 9780762485659.
