= Kissing Girls on Shabbat =

2024 memoir by Sara Glass

- Author: Sara Glass
- Genre: Memoir, Lesbian literature
- Publisher: One Signal (Atria)
- Publication date: June 11, 2024
- Pages: 288
- ISBN: 978-1-6680-3121-6

Kissing Girls on Shabbat: A Memoir is Sara Glass's 2024 memoir and debut book. It was a 2025 Stonewall Honor Book in Non-Fiction.

== Background ==
In an interview with her cousin Chloe Safier for Lilith Magazine, Sara Glass said she was motivated to write her memoir because:

There are so many people who still feel stuck in the Hasidic community. When I was married to my second husband, I started to think about what it might be like to be free. I went to my niece’s wedding. She was 18. When I looked at all my other little nieces, I knew that the 11 year olds might be married in six years. And I thought: there has to be someone queer here, or maybe someone who doesn’t want to get married. Or someone who wants to have a career, someone who’s different in some way. I wrote the book for them.

== Contents ==
Kissing Girls on Shabbat describes Sara Glass's life beginning from her youth. She grew up in Borough Park, Brooklyn, in an ultra-orthodox Gur Hasidic Jewish community. They lived in isolation from the rest of the city, avoiding television and outsiders, and called her Malka. She was raised to believe that her role would be as an obedient and devout wife to a Hasidic man. However, she felt attracted to women from a young age and was confused and ashamed of these feelings. When she was 19, she began a secret relationship with another woman, Dassa, who was also Hasidic. However, Glass's sisters used a matchmaker to find Glass a potential husband, and after six uncomfortable dates with Yossi, they married. Yossi was very strict in his interpretation of Judaism and would barely look at or talk to Glass when she was on her period. Glass had two children with Yossi. During her second birth, Yossi's desire to get rabbinical approval for her medication resulted in her giving birth after her epidural had worn off. When she later miscarried on Shabbat, Yossi did not let them call a doctor.

Glass's family did not see the value of women pursuing further education, but Glass was motivated to study social work due to the mental health struggles of her mother and sister. She decided to pursue a PhD, beginning with master's classes in social work at Rutgers, and her father and Yossi initially allowed it. She learned more about communities outside of her own during graduate school, as well as her own sexuality. Yossi told their rabbi that Glass was spending too much time on academics, and the rabbi decided Glass should stop. Glass decided that she needed to divorce Yossi, against the wishes of her family and his own. She finally negotiated a divorce via agreeing to a restrictive get, a rabbinical divorce contract. Under threat of losing custody of her children, she pledged to raise them in accordance with their traditions and with a new Jewish husband.

Glass then applied to doctorate programs and lived in poverty. At the same time, she began to try pursuing previously banned activities, and tried dating women as well as men. She married Eli, a considerate and wealthy man who supported her doctoral studies, and became a psychotherapist. She was able to retain her connection to her children and began educating them outside the Gur Hasidic system. However, in mourning the death of her closest sister, she lost her connection to Eli and they divorced. Glass moved to Manhattan and expanded her psychotherapy practice, working with LGBTQ people. She also came out as a lesbian.

== Publication ==
Kissing Girls on Shabbat: A Memoir was released on June 11, 2024, by One Signal (Atria).

== Reception ==
Kissing Girls on Shabbat was named a 2025 Stonewall Honor Book in Non-Fiction.

Phoebe Maltz Bovy, reviewing in an opinion piece for The Canadian Jewish News, named the book "an important testimony, an LGBTQ memoir, a story of family mental health crises: alcoholism, disordered eating, and suicide all make appearances." Bovy found the book to contain some dark humor, erotic moments that seemed designed for male readers, many open questions over the conflict between control and taboo sexuality, and some awkward asides about race, with no mention of current Israeli conflicts. Kirkus Reviews named the book "a courageously candid memoir" that argued for personal freedom. Neal Gendler, for The Jerusalem Post, agreed about the book's honesty, and called it "a story so beautifully told and engrossing that it’s hard to put down."

Publishers Weekly noted the book's power and Glass's empathetic voice, saying "few readers will be unmoved by the depth of her struggle or the strength of her resistance." Julie R. Enszer, for Jewish Book Council, noted the book's beautiful recounting of the relationship between Glass and Dassa and its examination of the cost of familial taboos. Enszer finds the book to be a story of Glass's choice to live courageously and come out, alongside her decision to raise her children to live openly and thoughtfully. In a review for The Washington Post, Karen Iris Tucker names the work as part of a brave tradition of works about people standing out from their orthodox communities, including Trembling Before G-d and Unorthodox, by Deborah Feldman. Tucker writes that Glass's love and sacrifices for her children form the heart of the narrative. Elyssa Everling, for Library Journal, also compared the book to Julia Haart's Brazen. Everling noted the book's power to help readers understand an often-hidden community and their beliefs.

== See also ==
- Educated
- Oranges Are Not the Only Fruit
- Hijab Butch Blues
- Boy Erased
- As a Woman
