= Rachel Wiley =

American poet, performer and activist

Rachel Wiley is an American poet, performer and activist.

Her poetry collection Revenge Body, which "tackles a culture of fat-shaming, queer-shaming, and racism," won the Stonewall Book Award's Inaugural Barbara Gittings Literature Award for Poetry in 2023.

== Selected publications ==
- Wiley, Rachel (2022). Revenge body: poems. Minneapolis, MN: Button Poetry/Exploding Pinecone Press. ISBN 978-1638340003.
- Wiley, Rachel (2020). Fat Girl Finishing School. Button Poetry. ISBN 978-1943735723.
- Wiley, Rachel (2018). Nothing is Okay. Button Poetry. ISBN 978-1943735303.
