= Janice E. Rench =

American social worker

- Janice E. Rench, from a 1981 newspaper
- Born: Janice Elizabeth Bingham; December 13, 1939; Brockton, Massachusetts, U.S.
- Died: April 12, 2016 (aged 76); Framingham, Massachusetts, U.S.
- Other names: Janice Kohler
- Occupation(s): Social worker, writer, lecturer

Janice Elizabeth Bingham Rench (December 13, 1939 – April 12, 2016) was an American social worker, lecturer, and writer. She was a victim's advocate in Cleveland and in the Boston area, usually working with survivors of sexual assault or domestic violence.

== Early life and education ==
Rench was born in Brockton, Massachusetts, the daughter of Clyde Anderson Bingham and Elizabeth M. Prentis Bingham. She graduated from Brockton High School.

== Career ==
Rench was a licensed social worker, and director of the Cleveland Rape Crisis Center. She later worked in domestic abuse counseling in Massachusetts. She wrote several books for teen readers, on sexuality and health issues. Rench's Understanding Sexual Identity (1990) was a finalist in the nonfiction category for the American Library Association's Gay and Lesbian Book Award (later renamed the Stonewall Book Award) in 1991. The same title was controversial in several school districts and restricted from teen library patrons in some locations.

Rench was one of three victim advocates who developed the original version of the Ohio Protocol for Sexual Assault Forensic and Medical Examination, in 1991. She served on an advisory panel of the National Crime Prevention Council. She gave an oral history interview in 2003 about the early years of the victim advocacy movement, and of rape crisis centers in the United States.

== Publications ==
- Feeling safe, feeling strong: How to avoid sexual abuse and what to do if it happens to you (1984, with Susan N. Terkel)
- Teen Sexuality Decisions and Choices (1989)
- Understanding Sexual Identity: A Book for Gay Teens and Their Friends (1990)
- Family Violence: How to Recognize and Survive It (1992)
- The Roller Coaster Ride: Bipolar Disorder (2010)

== Personal life ==
Bingham was married twice, and had three children. She died in 2016, in Framingham, Massachusetts, at the age of 76.
