= Rainbow Round Table =

American Library Association division for LGBTQ content

The Rainbow Round Table (RRT) of the American Library Association (ALA) is dedicated to supporting the information needs of LGBTQIA+ people, from professional library workers to the population at large. Founded in 1970, it is the nation's first gay, lesbian, bisexual, and transgender professional organization. While the current Rainbow moniker was adopted in 2019, the group has had various names during its 50-year history.

One of the core values of the organization is to reflect the diversity of the United States by "providing a full spectrum of resources and services to the communities" being served. The round table runs the Stonewall Book Award, Rainbow Book List, and Over the Rainbow Book List, among others.

== History ==
Originally established as the Task Force on Gay Liberation, part of ALA's Social Responsibilities Round Table (SRRT), the group was coordinated by Israel David Fishman in 1970, then by Barbara Gittings the following year.

=== 1970–1975: Task Force on Gay Liberation ===
Janet Cooper and Israel Fishman met at the American Library Association (ALA)'s 1970 Detroit Conference, at the Social Responsibilities Round Table (SSRT) session. The two decided to form a gay and lesbian task force. The first meeting of their new Task Force on Gay Liberation was June 30, 1970, at the same conference. 50 librarians met to discuss "the need to protect librarians' opportunities for, and security of, employment regardless of their sexual orientation" as well as "programs of action within ALA". The group was one of two new task forces for the SRRT, with the other being the task force on Women's Liberation. Members of the Detroit Gay Liberation Front also meet with the gay liberation task force. Fishman recounted that the Stonewall Riots, which happened exactly one year before the conference, pushed him towards the group's creation. In a later speech he said he was "inspired and truly touched by what was happening in New York hundreds of miles away...it was that shift in my consciousness—that I would no longer be afraid—that led me to bring about the birth of this Task Force, this miracle".

The Task Force on Gay Liberation continued to meet in 1970, creating its initial goals: the "creation of bibliographies, revision of library classification schemes and subject headings, building and improving access to collections, and fighting job discrimination". Barbara Gittings began creating bibliographies of gay-positive literature in 1970, which the group published as the Gay Bibliography in 1971. At the 1971 ALA conference, the task force began the Gay Book Award, hosted Joan Marshall and Steve Wolf for "Sex and the Single Cataloger: New Thoughts on Some Unthinkable Subjects," and got the ALA council to approve a resolution against discrimination towards non-straight library patrons and employees. They also supported Michael McConnell, who spoke at the conference about his experience with job discrimination at the University of Minnesota Libraries.

To raise awareness about the task force at the 1971 conference, the group hosted the first documented gay kissing booth, "Hug a Homosexual: Free Kisses," in the exhibit hall. One side was designated for men and the other for women, and task force members offered free hugs or kisses. When nobody lined up, Gittings and Alma Routsong, who won the first Gay Book Award that year, kissed.

Among its earliest endeavors, the Task Force campaigned for changes to the classification of library materials regarding the gay liberation movement. In the case of the Library of Congress Classification, materials had been designated to the scheme (HQ 71) for "Abnormal Sexual Relations, Including Sexual Crimes"; but after receiving the request from the Task Force, the Library of Congress in 1972 reclassified such books into the newly created scheme (HQ 76.5) for "Homosexuality, Lesbianism—Gay Liberation Movement, Homophile Movement". There was also at least one trans speaker at a task force event in the 1970s.

=== 1975–1986: Gay Task Force ===
In 1975, the task force renamed itself to the Gay Task Force. That year, 400 people attend an ALA conference panel on gay and lesbian YA literature.

The task force published a guide for better representation of queer literature in libraries: "What to Do Until the Utopia Arrives" by 1976.

=== 1986–2019: Expanding to GLBT ===
The group became the Gay and Lesbian Task Force (GLTF) in 1986. American Libraries featured the group on the cover of its July/August 1992 issue, drawing both criticism and praise from the library world. Some critiqued the cover as being "in poor taste" and accused the magazine of "glorifying homosexuality", while others voiced support of the editorial decision. Christine Williams, who wrote an essay about the controversy surrounding the cover, concluded that in the mid-90s, the library world was "not an especially welcoming place to gays and lesbians."

The group became the Gay, Lesbian, and Bisexual Task Force (GLBTF) in 1995, then the Gay, Lesbian, Bisexual, Transgender Round Table (GLBTRT) in 1999, a name change that endured for twenty years. The task force was approved to become a round table by a unanimous vote of the ALA council.

In 2005, Joan Roughgarden became the first trans woman to receive a Stonewall Book Award, for Evolution's Rainbow.

Throughout this time, the task force maintained the policy of reserving one co-chair position for men and one for women. When K. R. Roberto became co-chair in 2007, the nominating committee updated their language to be more broad, keeping one chair for women and one for people of other gender identities. Roberto was the first out trans person to hold a leadership position in the task force.

The Rainbow Project, which publishes the Rainbow Book List, began under the SRRT. Leaders in the ALA, SRRT, GLBTRT and Rainbow Project met in a charrette in 2009, resolving to move the Rainbow Project under the jurisdiction of both round tables. The initial 2008 rainbow list, for books published between 2005 and 2007, was shared with the support of both round tables in 2009.

=== 2019–present: Rainbow Round Table ===
In 2019, the round table renamed itself the Rainbow Round Table (RRT). Ana Elisa de Campos Salles, 2017 co-chair, said in an interview that the name change was part of welcoming new perspectives and voices, just as previous name changes had been. Of the old name, she said that "The Gay, Lesbian, Bisexual, and Transgender Round Table is, in my opinion, no longer inclusive of all of our membership. It just hasn’t been for a long time".

== Awards and book lists ==
The Task Force established the Stonewall Book Award in 1971, recognizing titles of exceptional merit relating to LGBTQ+ life. The first award was given to Patience and Sarah by Isabel Miller. That same year, the task force began to publish a bibliography of gay literature: a 48-book list that patrons could request by mail. They modified the list over time, and eventually published other bibliographies of LGBTQ literature.

In 2008 the GLBTRT compiled the inaugural Rainbow Book List of recent titles for children and teens. The list grew out of the task force's earlier bibliographies. The effort expanded in 2010 to a list of Over the Rainbow Books, annual bibliographies of titles of interest to LGBTQ+ adults. Both lists assist librarians selecting materials for their local collections. Library Journal recommends libraries stock the winners and finalists of LGBTQ literary awards like these and the Lambda Literary Awards, Publishing Triangle awards, and Gaylactic Spectrum Awards.

== Rainbow Book Month ==
Observed annually in June as a celebration of queer stories and authors, Rainbow Book Month was originally established in 1992 by the Publishing Triangle as National Lesbian and Gay Book Month. In 2015 the GLBTRT assumed oversight of the event, renamed GBLT Book Month. Efforts to increase the visibility of queer library materials include promoting the Rainbow Book and the Over the Rainbow Book lists, marketing on social media, and providing tools to library workers. In 2020 the month-long observance became Rainbow Book Month.

== See also ==
- Libraries and the LGBTQ community
