= John Preston (American author) =

American writer (1945–1994)

- Born: December 11, 1945; Medfield, Massachusetts, U.S.
- Died: April 28, 1994 (aged 48); Portland, Maine, U.S.
- Occupations: Author, editor
- Writing career
- Genre: Gay erotica

John Preston (December 11, 1945 in Medfield, Massachusetts – April 28, 1994 in Portland, Maine) was an American author of gay erotica and an editor of gay nonfiction anthologies.

== Life and works ==
He grew up in Medfield, Massachusetts, later living in a number of major American cities before settling in Portland, Maine in 1979. A writer of fiction and nonfiction, dealing mostly with issues in gay life, he was a pioneer in the early gay rights movement in Minneapolis. He helped found one of the earliest gay community centers in the United States, edited two newsletters devoted to sexual health, and served as editor of The Advocate in 1975.

He was the author or editor of nearly fifty books, including such erotic landmarks as Mr. Benson and I Once Had a Master and Other Tales of Erotic Love. Other works include Franny, the Queen of Provincetown (first a novel, then adapted for stage), The Big Gay Book: A Man's Survival Guide for the Nineties, Personal Dispatches: Writers Confront AIDS, and Hometowns: Gay Men Write About Where They Belong.

Preston's writing (which he described as pornography) was part of a movement in the 1970s and 1980s toward higher literary quality in gay erotic fiction. Preston was an outspoken advocate of the artistic and social worth of erotic writings, delivering a lecture at Harvard University entitled My Life as a Pornographer. The lecture was later published in an essay collection with the same name. The collection includes Preston's thoughts about the gay leather community, to which he belonged. His writings caused controversy when he was one of several gay and lesbian authors to have their books confiscated at the border by Canada Customs. Testimony regarding the literary merit of his novel I Once Had a Master helped a Vancouver LGBT bookstore, Little Sister's Book and Art Emporium, to partially win a case against Canada Customs in the Canadian Supreme Court in 2000. Preston also brought gay erotic fiction to mainstream readers by editing the Flesh and the Word anthologies for a major press.

Preston served as a journalist and essayist throughout his life. He wrote news articles for Drummer and other gay magazines, produced a syndicated column on gay life in Maine, and penned a column for Lambda Book Report called "Preston on Publishing." His nonfiction anthologies, which collected essays by himself and others on everyday aspects of gay and lesbian life, won him the Lambda Literary Award. and the American Library Association's Stonewall Book Award. He was especially noted for his writings on New England.

Although primarily known as a gay fiction writer, Preston was also hired by a local newspaper, The Portland Chronicle, to write news articles and features about his adopted hometown of Portland. He wrote a long feature about the local monopoly newspaper, the Portland Press Herald, as well as many food articles, movie reviews, and other writing.

In addition, Preston wrote men's adventure novels under the pseudonyms of Mike McCray, Preston MacAdam, and Jack Hild (pen names that he shared with other authors). Taking what he had learned from authoring those books, he wrote the "Alex Kane" adventure novels about gay characters. These books, which included "Sweet Dreams," "Golden Years," and "Deadly Lies," combined action-story plots with an exploration of issues such as the problems facing gay youth.

Preston was among the first writers to popularize the genre of safe sex stories, editing a safe sex anthology entitled Hot Living in 1985. He helped to found the AIDS Project of Southern Maine. In the late 1980s, he discovered that he himself was HIV positive.

Some of his last essays, found in his nonfiction anthologies and in his posthumous collection Winter's Light, describe his struggle to come emotionally to terms with a disease that had already killed many of his friends and fellow writers.

He died of AIDS complications on April 28, 1994, aged 48, at his home in Portland.

== Legacy ==
His papers are held in the Preston Archive at Brown University.

In 1994, Preston received the Steve Maidhof Award for National or International Work from the National Leather Association International.

In 2007 the National Leather Association International inaugurated awards for excellence in SM/fetish/leather writing. The categories include the John Preston award for short fiction.
