= Wayne Hoffman (author) =

American novelist

- Citizenship: United States
- Education: Tufts University; New York University
- Occupations: Deputy editor at Nextbook Press; Managing editor at Tablet Magazine
- Spouse: Mark Sullivan
- Writing career
- Language: English language
- Notable work: Sweet Like Sugar
- Notable awards: Barbara Gittings Literature Award

Wayne Hoffman is an American author and journalist.

Hoffman has contributed to The Village Voice, The Huffington Post, The Washington Post, The Advocate, Hadassah Magazine, and The New York Blade. He was managing editor at Billboard until 2003, and later held the same post at The Jewish Daily Forward. As of January 2014 he is deputy editor at Nextbook Press, a New York-based Jewish small press, in which capacity he also serves as managing editor for Tablet Magazine.

Hoffman is a graduate of Tufts University and New York University. He is married to fellow journalist Mark Sullivan.

His second novel, Sweet Like Sugar, received the Barbara Gittings Literature Award as part of the 2012 Stonewall Book Awards.

== Bibliography ==
- Hard: A Novel (2006)
- Policing Public Sex: Queer Politics and the Future of AIDS Activism (1996) (as editor)
- What We Brought Back: Jewish Life After Birthright (2010) (as editor)
- Sweet Like Sugar (2011)
- An Older Man (2015)
