= David Francis (author) =

Australian novelist, lawyer and academic (born 1958)

- Born: 12 November 1958 (age 67); Mornington, Victoria, Australia

David Francis (born 12 November 1958) is an Australian novelist, lawyer and academic.

== Life ==
David Francis was born in the Mornington Bush Nursing Hospital in Victoria, Australia on 12 November 1958. His mother, Judith Francis, was a prominent Australian horsewoman. Francis spent much of his early life between Mount Eliza, where he attended and was subsequently Dux Litterarum of The Peninsula School, and his historic family horse farm, "Tooradin Estate".

Francis studied arts and law at Monash University in Melbourne where he received his BA and LLB (hons.). After graduating, Francis worked as a solicitor at Allens in Melbourne for two years. In 1984, Francis represented Australia in an equestrian team competing in Europe. He subsequently travelled to the US where he rode on the US show-jumping circuit based outside New York.

In 1985, Francis moved to Los Angeles and for many years rode for legendary showjumping equestrian and three-time Olympian Kathryn Kusner while also working as a foreign lawyer for international law firms including Norton Rose Fulbright (2012 through 2022).

In the fight for freedom of expression, Francis was Vice President of PEN Center USA from 2011 through 2017. In 2015, Francis was selected as writer representative of PEN Center to the 81st PEN International Congress in Quebec City. In 2019, Francis was selected as PEN America's writer representative for the 85th PEN Congress in Manila where he was elected to the Board of Trustees of PEN International. He also serves as Chair of the Los Angeles Committee of PEN America.

In 2021, Francis married singer-songwriter, painter and optician, Myron Moss. In 2023, they were awarded a joint arts residency at the Cité internationale des arts in Paris. The couple spends part of each year at Tooradin Estate in southern Australia where Francis coaches showjumping, pursues equine therapies, edits manuscripts and continues to write novels, short stories and essays. In 2024 Francis was selected as a member of Equestrian Australia’s National Coaching Committee and recently completed his fourth novel, Trick Season.

== Novels and literary career ==
Francis started writing fiction in 1996. His first novel, Agapanthus Tango, tells the story of the travels of a 12-year-old boy, named Day, when he sets out on his horse after his mother dies. Agapanthus Tango was first published by HarperCollins/Fourth Estate in the United Kingdom and then by HarperCollins in Australia. Since then, it has been translated, and re-published, in Germany (2002), Italy (2002), Holland (2002) and France (2004). In 2005 it was published in the United States with the new title, The Great Inland Sea, by MacAdam/Cage. In 2006, the French company, Serena Films, purchased the film rights for the novel.

Writing for The Washington Post, Jeff Turrentine described The Great Inland Sea as "a bowl of ripe cherries: graceful and unaffected...we should be grateful for stories of this scale, crafted by writers of this skill". The San Francisco Chronicle featured The Great Inland Sea as an "Editor's recommendation", writing: "David Francis may not be a poet, but he sure writes like one. His prose is lean but dreamy, full of sensual detail [...] It's all done with skill and elegance."

In 2008, Francis's second novel, Stray Dog Winter was published Allen & Unwin in Australia, and by MacAdam/Cage in the US. The novel centres on a love story that is set in 1980s Moscow. Booklist described Stray Dog Winter as "Vibrant with the discordant images of political repression and smoldering sexuality, Francis ethereally transports readers to a preternatural time where nothing and no one are what they seem". Los Angeles Magazine said "Francis's prose has the sparse elegance of a Xeriscape. Every detail holds water". The Australian Book Review called it "An impressive political thriller, beautifully crafted with a spectacular climax." Stray Dog Winter was named as a 2008 "Book of the Year" in The Advocate, "Australian Novel of the Year" in the Australian Literary Review (2008), was a Lambda Literary Award finalist in 2009, and won the American Library Association's Barbara Gittings Award in 2010.

Stray Dog Winter was optioned by White Hot Productions in Australia and is currently being prepared as a limited series for television in the United States. Francis's third novel, Wedding Bush Road, was released to critical acclaim in 2016 in the United States by Counterpoint Press and in Australia by Brio. The Library Journal said: “In prose as severely beautiful as the land depicted, Francis takes us into the bleeding heart of family.” Los Angeles Review of Books said: “Francis's prose is urgent and at times breathless, packed with sense–rich descriptions. Poetic images swirl off the page . . . a rich, beautifully textured novel, unforgettable in its setting and the people who live there.” Pulitzer Prize winner Jane Smiley wrote: “Wedding Bush Road is his best book yet!” Nathan Hill said: “David Francis has given us a masterpiece, a novel for anyone who's ever left their hometown.” Janet Fitch exclaimed: “Gorgeous, dangerous and utterly captivating!”

Francis's work has appeared in The Sydney Morning Herald, The Age, The Elegant Variation, Wet Ink, The Advocate, the Southern California Review, Best Australian Short Stories (2010 and 2015), Griffith Review, Meanjin, The Los Angeles Times, Best Australian Love Stories, and The Harvard Review.

Francis’ poetry has been published in The Rattling Wall and anthologized in Slow Lightning, Impractical Poetry, and Astonished Poetry. Francis has received numerous writing fellowships including to the Cité internationale des arts in Paris (2002, 2004, 2007 and 2023) and to Hawthornden Castle in Scotland in 2016, and has appeared at more than fifty book festivals and performed as moderator or featured author in more than 100 literary events on three continents, from Perth to Paris. His radio stories have been broadcast on Australian Broadcasting Corporation and elsewhere, including Postcard to Tooradin and A Stage in My Life, both featured on The Friday Review on ABC radio. Francis has taught creative writing at Occidental College, University of California, Los Angeles, and for the Masters of Professional Writing program at the University of Southern California, where he is a member of the Los Angeles Institute for the Humanities.

== Achievements and awards ==
- 2002. Awarded the Australian Literature Fund Fellowship to the Kessing Studio in Paris.
- 2010 Commendation of the Fellowship of Australian Writers National Literary Award.
- 2010 American Library Association, Barbara Gittings Literature Award.
- 2019 Board of Trustees, PEN International

== List of works ==
=== Novels ===
- Agapanthus Tango – ISBN 1-84115-488-1
- Great Inland Sea – ISBN 1-59692-180-3
- Stray Dog Winter – ISBN 978-1-59692-315-7
- Wedding Bush Road - ISBN 978-1-61902-787-9

=== Short fiction ===
- "How's It Going Peter Pan?" (Southern California Review (1.2), 2008)
- "Daisy on the Bridge" (Wet Ink, 2008)
- "Once Removed" (Best Australian Stories of 2010, Black Inc, 2010)
- "Parts Unknown" – (Meanjin, 2012)

=== Non-fiction ===
- "No Jesus Man" - (Griffith Review, 2012)
- "Watching Australia Burn" - (Los Angeles Times, 2020)
