= Israel David Fishman =

American librarian and gay activist

- Born: 21 February 1938; Westerly, Rhode Island, USA
- Died: 14 June 2006 (aged 68)
- Education: City College of New York (1965); Columbia University School of Library Service (1966)
- Occupations: librarian, activist
- Known for: founded the Task Force on Gay Liberation in 1970, Stonewall Non-fiction Book Award is named after him

Israel David Fishman (February 21, 1938 – June 14, 2006) founded the Task Force on Gay Liberation in 1970. In 2002, the American Library Association named the Stonewall Book Award-Israel Fishman Non-Fiction Award after him.

== Early life and education ==
Fishman was born on February 21, 1938, in Westerly, Rhode Island, the son of Minnie C. and Benjamin Fishman. They were Orthodox Jews. His father was an ordained rabbi, although he never practiced as a clergyman.

In September 1946, at 8 years old, Fishman entered Yeshiva Torah Vodaath in Williamsburg, New York. At 15 years old he was hospitalized and given electric shock therapy in an attempt to change his sexual orientation. He left Orthodox Judaism and was estranged from his family for decades due to his sexual orientation.

Between 1956 and 1965 Fishman worked as an office assistant. In 1958, he enrolled in the City College of New York, first as an evening student, and then enrolling full-time. He graduated with a B.A. degree, magna cum laude and Phi Beta Kappa, in Philosophy in 1965. In May 1966, he completed a Master of Library Science at the Columbia University School of Library Service.

== Librarian Career and TFGL ==
"How can you be queer and Jewish orthodox? I have studied too much Talmud to be able to accept the fact that somebody is Orthodox and queer at the same time. Can't be! In order to match my sanity and my selfhood I had to leave. I had to rebel. I had to throw everything away."

— Israel David Fishman

Fishman was the head of technical services at the Jewish Theological Seminary library and then acquisitions librarian at Richmond College. In 1970 Fishman became the circulation librarian at Upsala College in East Orange, New Jersey, and was also an assistant professor.

In 1970, Fishman attended the American Library Association (ALA) meeting in Detroit and conceived the idea of a gay liberation group within the library profession. He subsequently founded the Task Force on Gay Liberation (TFGL), a section of the Social Responsibilities Round Table and the world's first gay professional association. He later wrote that it was a "shift in my consciousness—that I would no longer be afraid—that led me to bring about the birth of this Task Force, this miracle, this incredible tool/weapon for social change and liberation”. The task force's aims included: "the creation of bibliographies, revision of library classification schemes and subject headings, building and improving access to collections, and fighting job discrimination."

The following year, Barbara Gittings succeeded Fishman in leadership of the TFGL. The New York Public Library archives holds a photograph of Fishman "crowning" Gittings, taken by her partner, Kay Tobin.

The TFGL took several actions at the 1971 ALA annual meeting in Dallas. At this time, anti-LGBTQ discrimination was widespread in the librarian profession. After librarian Michael McConnell's job offer at the University of Minnesota was rescinded due to his sexual orientation, Fishman asked the ALA to voice their opposition. The ALA declined to support McConnell, so the TFGL disrupted the annual meeting with zap actions. Fishman also introduced an LGBTQ nondiscrimination resolution at the Dallas meeting; an edited version was approved.

Additionally, the TFGL held a ceremony at the 1971 ALA meeting to bestow the first Gay Book Award; only 9 people attended. It became increasingly prestigious over the next 15 years, until the ALA officially started bestowing the Gay Book Award in 1986. The award has been renamed multiple times until 2002 when it became the Stonewall Book Award-Barbara Gittings Literature Award and the Stonewall Book Award-Israel Fishman Non-Fiction Award.

After Upsala College denied Fishman tenure in 1973, he went on 6 months of sick leave. Fishman credited his activism in the TFGL with the decline of his librarian career. Disillusioned by library science, he left the profession.

== Post-Librarian Life ==
Fishman briefly moved to Los Angeles, California to work and study at the Gay Community Services Center, returning to New York in 1973 where he became licensed in Swedish massage. In 1989 he was photographed by Robert Giard for his series Particular Voices; the photograph is currently stored in the Yale University Library with Giard's papers. For some time, Fishman ran a mail order vitamin store in Brooklyn.

In 1995, Fishman gave a speech at the 25th anniversary of the TFGL, at that time called the Gay, Lesbian, and Bisexual Task Force (GLBTF). He stated that the task force has "helped us to use our libraries for the liberation of our brothers and sisters." The speech was included as the essay "How the GLBTF Got Started" in the 1997 anthology Liberating Minds: The Stories and Professional Lives of Gay, Lesbian, and Bisexual Librarians and Their Advocates.

The 1998 anthology Daring to Find Our Names: The Search for Lesbigay Library History includes an essay by Fishman called "Founding Father", recounting his experiences in the TFGL. The volume also includes essays by Gittings and another librarian named Janet Cooper. One reviewer said that the three essays "are unusual in their openness, sharing their wounds which still seem fresh but not festering".

Fishman was featured in the 2001 documentary Trembling Before G-d, a film about the experiences of LGBTQ Orthodox Jews. The documentary shows him calling his estranged father and organizing "Big Knish" tours through his former neighborhood in Williamsburg, Brooklyn.

By 2002, the TFGL's Gay Book Award had become an official award bestowed by the ALA and had been renamed multiple times. That year, it became the Stonewall Book Award-Barbara Gittings Literature Award and the Stonewall Book Award-Israel Fishman Non-Fiction Award.

Between 1995 and 2004, Fishman sent a collection of his papers to the New York Public Library, including documentation from TFGL and correspondence with people such as Susan Saxe, Robert Austin Sullivan, and members of the Radical Faerie Movement.

Fishman was active in the Park Slope Food Cooperative, serving in various leadership positions, including president, between 1998 until his death in 2006.

== Personal life and death ==
In 1974, Fishman met his longtime partner, Carl Navarro, at the West Side Discussion Group, a regular gathering of gay men. In 2006, they celebrated their 32nd anniversary.

After Fishman participated in the 2001 documentary Trembling Before G-d, he was reunited with his family, including his elderly father with whom he had not spoken for decades.

Fishman died on June 14, 2006. The ALA honored him with a resolution at their annual conference. A memorial service was held on October 22, 2006, at the Union Temple in Brooklyn.

== Works and Media Appearance ==
- Fishman, Israel D. "How the GLBTF Got Started" in Norm G. Lester, ed. Liberating Minds: The Stories and Professional Lives of Gay, Lesbian, and Bisexual Librarians and Their Advocates. (Jefferson, N.C.: McFarland, 1997), 87–88.
- Fishman, Israel D. "Founding Father," in James V. Carmichael Jr., ed., Daring to Find Our Names: The Search for Lesbigay Library History (Westport, Conn.: Greenwood Press, 1998), 107–12.
- Israel David Fishman Papers, 1967–2002. New York Public Library.
- Trembling before G-d. Directed by Sandi Simcha DuBowski, Cinephil, 2001.
