= LaShonda K. Barnett =

American novelist

- Born: May 27, 1974 (age 52) Kansas City, Missouri, U.S.
- Occupation: Author; playwright; radio host
- Education: University of Missouri–Kansas City (BA); Sarah Lawrence College (MA); College of William & Mary (PhD)
- Notable awards: Stonewall Book Award (2016)

LaShonda Katrice Barnett (born May 27, 1974) is an American author, playwright, and former radio host. She has published short stories, edited books on African-American music, and written a trilogy of full-length plays.

Her 2015 debut novel Jam on the Vine received a Stonewall Book Award by the American Library Association (2016). The novel courses the life of African American journalist Ivoe Williams. The book was named a finalist in the lesbian fiction category at the 2016 Lambda Literary Awards.

Barnett's short fiction appears in numerous anthologies and in literary journals such as The Chicago Tribune ("Printer's Row"), Callaloo, Gemini Magazine, Guernica Magazine, Foglilfter Journal, Peacock Journal, and Amherst College's Common Literary Magazine, among other publications.

== Biography ==
Barnett was born in Kansas City, Missouri in 1974 and grew up as one of five siblings in Park Forest, Cook County, Illinois.

Barnett received a B.A. in English Language and Literature and Linguistics (with language specialization in German and Russian) from the University of Missouri and an M.A. in Women's History from Sarah Lawrence College. She earned a Ph.D. in American Studies from the College of William & Mary.

She has held residencies at the Noepe Center for Literary Arts-Martha's Vineyard, the Sewanee Writers’ Conference, and the Fine Arts Work Center. In 2015, she was twice nominated for the Pushcart Prize. She has taught at Columbia University, Sarah Lawrence College, Brown University, Northwestern University and Syracuse University on history and literature of the African diaspora and Women's Studies. She hosted her own jazz program, Mapping Jazz, for WBAI (99.5 FM, NYC).

In 2007, Barnett's personal interviews on creative process with women musicians resulted in the book I Got Thunder: Black Women Songwriters On Their Craft and Off The Record: Conversations With African American & Brazilian Women Musicians in 2015.

Barnett received grants for her work from the Rhode Island State Council on the Arts and the National Endowment for the Humanities; and awards from the New York Money for Women/Barbara Deming Memorial Fund, and the College Language Association (for best short fiction).

== Works ==
=== Books ===
- LaShonda K. Barnett, (ed.) I Got Thunder: Black Women Songwriters on Their Craft, Thunder's Mouth Press, 2007, ISBN 9781568583310
- Off the Record: Conversations with African American and Brazilian Women Musicians, Scarecrow Press, Incorporated, 2012; ISBN 9780810877467
- Jam on the Vine: A Novel. Grove/Atlantic, Incorporated. February 3, 2015. ISBN 978-0-8021-9157-1.
- Callaloo and Other Lesbian Love Tales. New Victoria Publishers. October 1999; ISBN 978-1892281081.

=== Short stories ===
- "Callaloo" (2007)
- "Dear, dear Shay" (2012)
- "Road to Wingo" (2013)
- "Courage, Meine Freundin" (2013)
- "Hen's Teeth" (2013)
- "533" (2013)
- "Broken Shoes For Walking (Wings That Never Fit)" (2014)
- "Ezekiel Saw the Wheel" (2014)
- "Graf" (2014)
- "Waltz Me Once Again" (2015)
- "You're the Sweetest One" (2017)

== See also ==
- American literature
- African American literature
