= Welsh Boys Too =

2000 story collection by John Sam Jones

- First edition
- Author: John Sam Jones
- Language: English
- Set in: Wales
- Publisher: Parthian
- Publication date: 2000
- Publication place: Wales
- Media type: Paperback
- Pages: 91
- Awards: Stonewall Award (Honor Book), 2002
- ISBN: 1902638115

Welsh Boys Too is a 2000 short story collection by British author John Sam Jones, published by Parthian Books. In 2002, it was named as a 'Stonewall Honor Book' by the Stonewall Book Awards.

== Synopsis ==
The book is a collection of eight fictional stories inspired by the lives of gay men living in Wales.

== Reception ==
Welsh Boys Too was praised as "intriguing" by Publishers Weekly, and was also positively received in The Western Mail and Gay Times. In 2002, it was named as a 'Stonewall Honor Book in Literature' by the Stonewall Book Awards, which recognised its exceptional merit relating to the gay/lesbian/bisexual/transgender experience.
