= Andrew Evans (travel writer) =

American travel writer

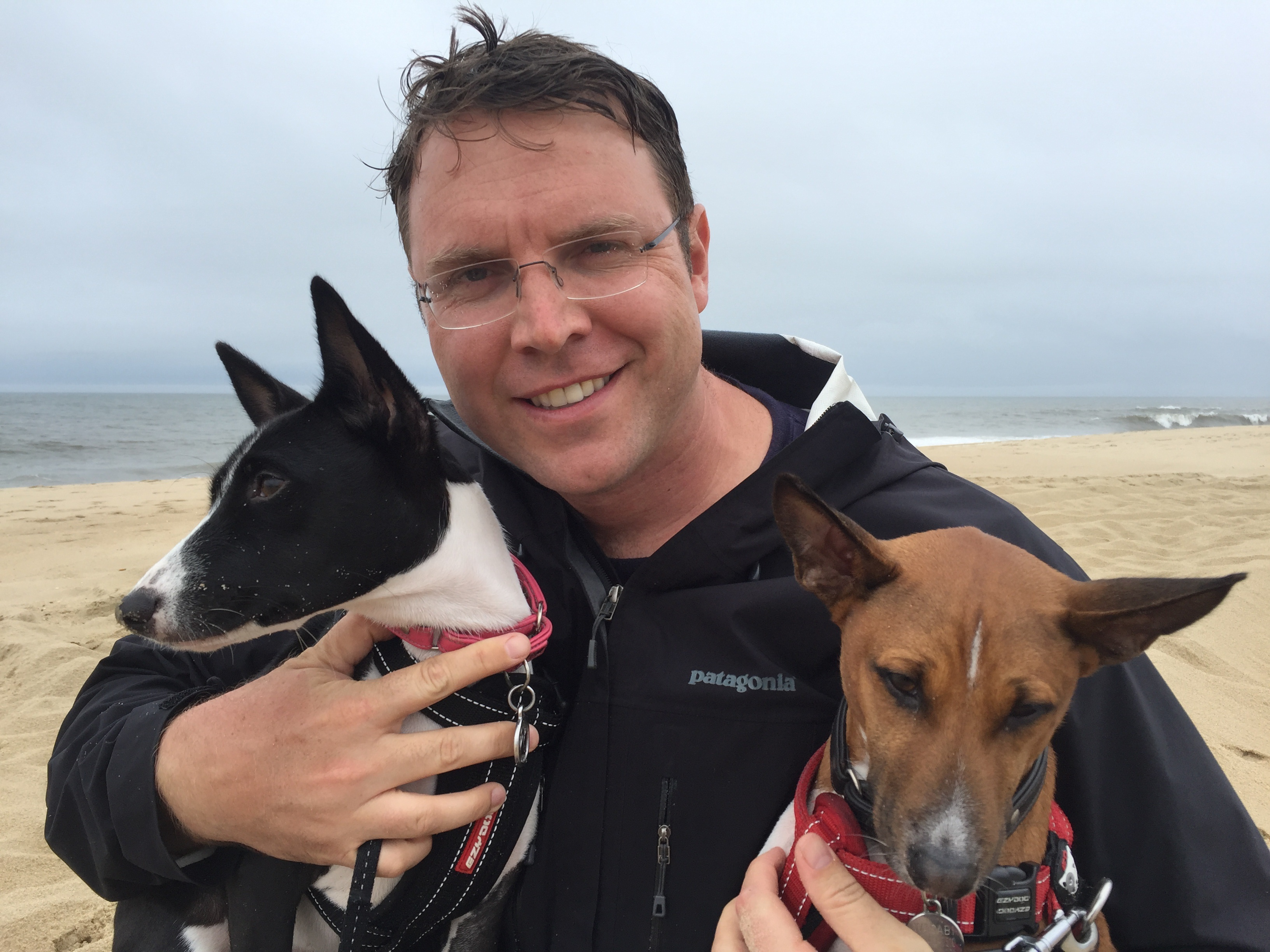
- Born: Andrew Ellis Evans
- Education: Brigham Young University, Oxford University
- Occupation: Author
- Writing career
- Language: English
- Genres: Travel; Memoir
- Notable awards: Lowell Thomas Award from the Society of American Travel Writers; Stonewall Book Award from American Library Association

Andrew Evans is an American travel writer, author and television host.

== Early life and education ==
Evans was born in Texas and raised in Ohio. He began traveling internationally at the age of 16 when he moved to France on a Rotary Youth Exchange, and later to Ukraine as a missionary for the Church of Jesus Christ of Latter-day Saints.

Evans was raised as a Mormon, but had struggles with expressing his gay identity at Brigham Young University. In an article for Outsports, Evans discussed the compulsory year of conversion therapy and "traumatic moments" BYU made him undergo in the late 90s as a student after he was caught kissing a man by his roommate. BYU told him he could be expelled or visit weekly with his bishop, turn in fellow gay students, cut off contact with any gay friends, and have frequent visits with a BYU therapist until he was heterosexual and "safe" for other students to be around. Included in the therapy was weekly dates with women as an additional attempt to change his attractions.

He got his master's degree at Oxford University where he studied Geography and Russian Foreign Policy.

== Career ==
Evans began working for National Geographic Traveler on a real-time digital story-telling assignment in 2009 on an assignment called "Bus to Antarctica". He traveled overland from Washington DC to Tierra del Fuego by bus and the last leg to Antarctica by boat. When Evans reached the island of South Georgia, he encountered a black emperor penguin, which was described to be as rare as "one in a zillion". It later became the namesake of his 2017 travel memoir The Black Penguin, which expands upon his blog posts and tweets and includes insights from Evans about his struggles regarding family, religion, and sexuality, The memoir received a Stonewall Book Award honor.

He was given the moniker of National Geographic's "digital nomad", as he continued on other assignments, and also contributed to the compilation book Four Seasons of Travel. As National Geographic Traveler's "Digital Nomad," Evans filed live dispatches from all seven continents and more than 100 countries, broadcasting from locations including a kayak, camelback, and helicopter, as well as from atop arctic glaciers and from inside King Tut's tomb. He was the first person to live-tweet an ascent of Mount Kilimanjaro, and gained a wide following for an overland journey from National Geographic's Washington, D.C. headquarters to Antarctica using public transportation. In his role as Digital Nomad, Evans spent as many as 276 days a year on the road, traveling by train, boat, private jet, camel, horseback, and dog sled; he has sailed across the Atlantic twice.

== Personal life ==
Evans is married to Brian. They live in Virginia's Blue Ridge Mountains near the Washington DC metro area.

== Books ==
- The Black Penguin (University of Wisconsin Press, 2017), ISBN 978-0299311407

Bradt Travel Guides

- (with Massimiliano Di Pasquale) Ukraine (Bradt/Globe Pequot, 2004–2013 (4th ed.)), ISBN 9781841624501
- Iceland (Bradt/ Globe Pequot, 2009–2018 (4th ed.)), ISBN 9781784770440
- Reykjavik: The Bradt e-Guide (Bradt/Globe Pequot, 2014–2017 (2nd ed.))

== Television ==
Evans has hosted several travel shows on the National Geographic Channel

- 2017 Hidden Cities Revealed: Baku
- 2015 A Peak Under the Hood of Innovation in Detroit. CNet

2020 Turkey's Hidden Gems series:

- "Land of Ancients" (2020)
- "Lost Cities of Anatolia" (2020)
- "Istanbul: East Meets West" (2020)

World's Smart Cities series:

- "Durban" (2014)
- "Bucharest" (2014)
- "San Diego" (2015)

== Awards and honors ==
- Lowell Thomas Award Silver Award for Guidebooks from the Society of American Travel Writers, Iceland, 2008
- Stonewall Book Award Stonewall Honor Books in Non-Fiction from the American Library Association, The Black Penguin, 2018
- Walter Cronkite Award from Reach the World, 2015
