= Matt Houlbrook =

British academic historian

Matt Houlbrook is a British academic historian who is Professor of Cultural History at the University of Birmingham.

== Career ==
Houlbrook grew up in South Humberside, near Scunthorpe, and studied history at the University of Cambridge (graduating with a Bachelor of Arts degree). He completed his doctorate (PhD) at the University of Essex in 2002, with a thesis entitled "A sun among cities": space, identities and queer male practices, London 1918–57. He then spent three years as a Junior Research Fellow at New College, Oxford, and then five years at the University of Liverpool. In 2008 he was appointed a Fellow at Magdalen College, Oxford, where he taught history. In 2013 he moved to the University of Birmingham, where as of 2026 he is Professor of Cultural History.

== Research ==
Houlbrook's work focuses on the cultural history of modern Britain, with particular reference to sexuality, the city, gender and selfhood. His work has looked at the intersection between urban spaces and sexual identities, as well as the connections between cosmetics, consumer culture, sexuality and the law. His publications include:

=== Books ===
- (with Aidy Aitchison, Dominique Moran, Yvonne Jewkes, and Jennifer Turner) Incarcerated: Contemporary Photography from the Victorian Prison (Bluecoat Press, 2026)
- Songs of Seven Dials: An Intimate History of 1920s and 1930s London (Manchester University Press, 2025)
- (edited with Katie Jones and Ben Mechen) Men and Masculinities in Modern Britain: A History for the Present (Manchester University Press, 2024)
- Prince of Tricksters: The Incredible True Story of Netley Lucas, Gentleman Crook (University of Chicago Press, 2016)
- Queer London: Perils and Pleasures in the Sexual Metropolis, 1918–57 (University of Chicago Press, 2005)

=== Articles ===
- (with Alison Twells, Will Pooley, and Helen Rogers) "Undisciplined History: Creative Methods and Academic Practice," History Workshop Journal vol. 96 (2023), pp. 153–175.
- "On the emptiness of the glory hole, and other non-problems," Modernism/Modernity vol. 1, no. 3 (2016).
- "Commodifying the self within: ghosts, libels and the crook lifestory in Interwar Britain", Journal of Modern History, vol. 85, no. 2 (2013), pp. 321–63.
- (with Sarah Newman) "Introduction: The Press and Popular Culture in Interwar Europe", Journalism Studies, vol. 14, no. 5 (2013).
- "Fashioning an ex-crook self: citizenship and criminality in the work of Netley Lucas," Twentieth Century British History, vol. 24, no. 1 (2013), pp. 1–30.
- "A pin to see the peep show: culture, fiction and selfhood in the letters of Edith Thompson", Past and Present, vol. 207, no. 1 (2010), pp. 215–49.
- "The man with the powder puff in Interwar London", Historical Journal, vol. 50, no.1 (2007), pp. 145–71.
- (with Chris Waters) "The heart in exile: detachment and desire in 1950s London", History Workshop Journal, vol. 62 (2006).
- "Sexing the history of sexuality", History Workshop Journal, vol. 60, no.1 (2005), pp. 216–22.
- "Soldier heroes and rent boys: homosex, masculinities and Britishness in the Brigade of Guards: c. 1900–1960", Journal of British Studies, vol. 42, issue 3 (2003), pp. 351–88.
- "'Lady Austin's camp boys': constituting the queer subject in 1930s London", Gender and History, vol. 14, issue 1 (2002), pp. 31–61.
- "Towards a Historical Geography of Sexuality", Journal of Urban History, vol. 2, issue 4 (2001), pp. 497–504.
- "The private world of public urinals: London 1918–1957", London Journal, vol. 25, issue 1 (2000), pp. 52–70.
