= Abdi Nazemian =

Iranian-American writer and producer (born 1976)

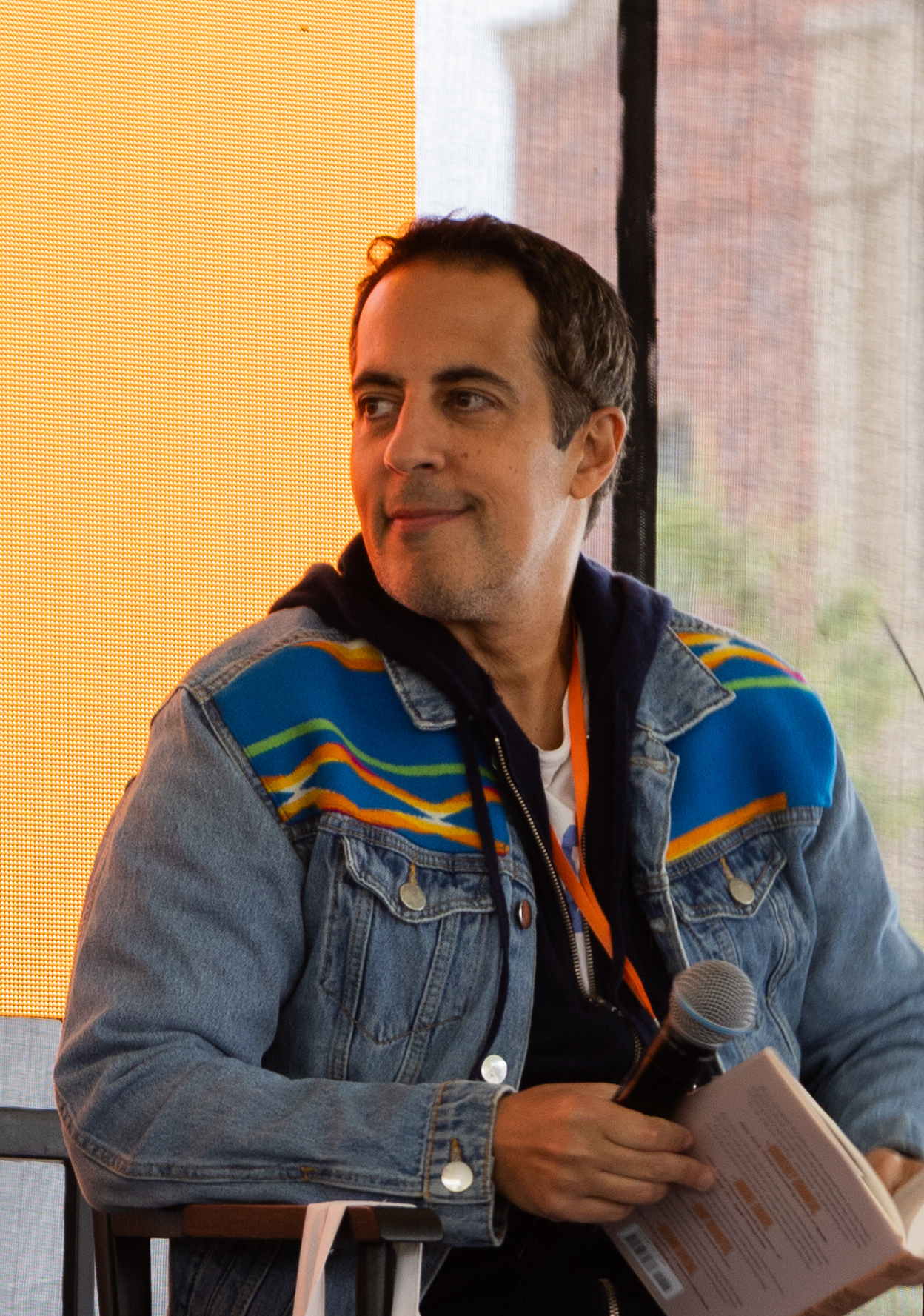
- Nazemian in 2025
- Born: 1976 (age 49–50); Iran
- Education: Columbia University (BA); University of California, Los Angeles (MBA)
- Occupations: Novelist, screenwriter
- Writing career
- Language: English
- Years active: 2000s–present
- Notable awards: Lambda Literary Award for Debut Fiction (2015)
- Website: abdinazemian.com

Abdi Nazemian (born 1976) is an Iranian-American author, screenwriter, and producer. His debut novel, The Walk-In Closet, won the Lambda Literary Award for LGBT Debut Fiction at the 27th Lambda Literary Awards. He has subsequently received a second Lambda Literary Award for his young adult novel Only This Beautiful Moment, as well as a Stonewall Book Award for Only This Beautiful Moment and a Stonewall Honor for Like a Love Story, both from the American Library Association.

== Career ==
Nazemian is a Choate Rosemary Hall alumnus. It was at Choate that he first wanted to become a writer. Nazemian continued his education at Columbia University and then at the University of California, Los Angeles, where he received a Master of Business Administration.

Since, Nazemian has also worked as a screenwriter, including the television shows Ordinary Joe, Almost Family, The Village and It's Not Like That, and the films The Artist's Wife, Menendez: Blood Brothers, Beautiful Girl, Celeste in the City and The Quiet. As head of development for Water's End Productions, Nazemian has served as an executive producer or associate producer on numerous films, including Call Me By Your Name, Little Woods, Scotty and the Secret History of Hollywood, It Happened in L.A., The Price, and The House of Tomorrow.

=== Literary work ===
His debut young adult novel, The Authentics, was released in 2017 by Balzer + Bray, an imprint of HarperCollins. His third novel, Like a Love Story, a love letter to queer history, ACT UP and Madonna, was released in 2019, again by Balzer + Bray. It was chosen by Time magazine as one of the 100 best young adult novels of all time, received a Stonewall Honor and a nomination for the Audie Awards.

His fourth novel, The Chandler Legacies, which is inspired by his time at boarding school, was published in 2022. His 2023 young adult novel, Only This Beautiful Moment, won the 2024 Lambda Literary Award for Young Adult Literature as well as the 2024 Stonewall Book Award for Young Adult Literature from the American Library Association.

His upcoming novel Desert Echoes will be published by HarperCollins in the United States in September 2024.

Nazemian's books, especially Like a Love Story, have been widely challenged or banned across the United States. He told CNN that his response to the banning is, "First and foremost, a heartbreak over the message it sends to young queer kids who deserve love and support."

== Awards and honors ==
Three of Abdi Nazemian's books are Junior Library Guild selections: Like a Love Story (2019),The Chandler Legacies (2022), and Only This Beautiful Moment (2023).

Time named Like a Love Story among the 100 best young adult novels of all time. In 2019, the Chicago Public Library and New York Public Library included it on their list of the best young adult books of the year. The following year, the Young Adult Library Services Association included it on their top ten list of Best Fiction for Young Adults.

Only This Beautiful Moment was included on Booklist's 2023 "Booklist Editors' Choice: Books for Youth" list. It was also included on best books of the year lists from publications including The Guardian, New York Public Library, Kirkus, and The Boston Globe.

Only this Beautiful Moment was also the winner of both the 2024 Lambda Literary Award for Young Adult Literature and the 2024 Stonewall Award for Young Adult Literature from the American Library Association.

Awards for Nazemian's writing
Year	Title	Award	Result	Ref.
2014	The Walk-In Closet	Next Generation Indie Book Award for Multicultural Fiction	Finalist	
2015	The Walk-In Closet	Lambda Literary Award for LGBT Debut Fiction	Won	
2020	Like a Love Story	Audie Award for Young Adult Title	Finalist	
2020	Like a Love Story	Mike Morgan & Larry Romans Young Adult Literature Award	Honor	
2023	Only This Beautiful Moment	Mike Morgan & Larry Romans Young Adult Literature Award	Won	
2024	Only This Beautiful Moment	Lambda Literary Award for Young Adult Literature	Finalist	
2024	Only This Beautiful Moment	ALA Stonewall Book Award for Young Adult Literature	Won	

== Publications ==
- The Walk-In Closet. Curtis Brown. 2015. ISBN 978-0-61-598868-9.
- The Authentics. Balzer + Bray. 2017. ISBN 978-0-06-248646-2.
- Like a Love Story. Balzer + Bray. 2019. ISBN 978-0-06-283936-7.
- The Chandler Legacies. Balzer + Bray. 2022. ISBN 978-0-06-303932-2.
- Only This Beautiful Moment. Balzer + Bray. 2023. ISBN 978-0-06-303937-7.
- Desert Echoes. HarperCollins. 2024. ISBN 978-0063339637.

== Filmography ==
Year	Title	Creator	Writer	Executive Producer	Notes
2019	The Village	No	Yes	No	
2019	Almost Family	No	Yes	No	
2021	Ordinary Joe	No	Yes	No	
2026	It's Not Like That †	No	Yes	Producer	
