= Martin Hyatt =

American contemporary writer

- Born: Louisiana, U.S.
- Education: Goddard College; Eugene Lang College of Liberal Arts; The New School (MFA)
- Occupation: Writer

Martin Hyatt is an American contemporary writer. Born in Louisiana, he later attended Goddard College, Eugene Lang College, and received an MFA in creative writing from The New School. Hyatt's fiction is usually set in the working-class American South. His work is characterized by its lyricism and realism. He has taught writing at a number of colleges and universities, including Hofstra University and Parsons School of Design. He has taught Creative Writing at School of Visual Arts, St. Francis College, and Southern New Hampshire University.

== Works ==
=== Books ===
==== A Scarecrow's Bible (novel) ====
His critically acclaimed first novel, A Scarecrow's Bible, was published in 2006. The novel, set in the deep south, centers on a closeted, working-class, married Vietnam veteran who comes to terms with his sexuality while battling a drug addiction. For this book, Hyatt won the Edmund White Award for debut fiction in 2007. The American Library Association named his novel a Stonewall Honor Book. He was also a finalist for the Ferro-Grumley Award, the Lambda Literary Award, and the Violet Quill Award. Critic Richard Labonté named A Scarecrow's Bible one of the top ten fiction titles of the year. In 2007, he was named a literary "Star of Tomorrow" by New York Magazine. Edmund White called the book "a stunning début." Poet/activist Minnie-Bruce Pratt said the book was a "narrative tour-de-force."

==== Beautiful Gravity (novel) ====
Hyatt's most recent book, Beautiful Gravity, was published by AntiBookClub in 2016. Beautiful Gravity is "set in a small town deep in the Louisiana bayous when the peaceful nothingness that envelops the narrator and his only friend, the anorexic daughter of the Pentecostal preacher, turns emotionally turbulent with the arrival of a beautiful city burnished couple in a red sports car and love affairs of every persuasion change lives forever." In January 2017, the American Library Association announced that Beautiful Gravity had received a 2017 Stonewall Honor Book Award from the American Library Association. The book received critical praise in places such as Kirkus and New York Journal of Books.

==== Greyhound Country (memoir) and other works ====
Hyatt's work has appeared in a wide range of publications and anthologies. His personal essays, "How To Skin A Deer" (University of Wisconsin Press) and "Greyhound Boy, 1976" (Alyson Books) were featured in Lambda Literary award-winning anthologies and on The Huffington Post Other personal essays, including "In Tongues" (Electric Literature) and "My Last Big Addiction" are excerpts from Hyatt's memoir, Greyhound Country. The memoir chronicles the author's struggles with addiction, and his relationship with his southern family, including his developmentally disabled younger brother. His 2016 Huffington Post post-election piece "An Open Letter to Mike Pence: We are Not Doing That Again" was widely read and shared on social media.

=== Essays and stories ===
- "An Open Letter to Mike Pence" in The Huffington Post. (November 2016)
- "How to Skin a Deer: What My Father Taught Me About Writing" in Who's Yer Daddy. Eds. Elledge and Groff: Wisconsin: University of Wisconsin Press. (2012)
- "My Last Big Addiction" in Love, Christopher Street. Ed. Thomas Keith. New York: Vantage Point Press. (2012)
- "In Tongues" in Electric Literature. (2009)
- "Greyhound Boy, 1976" in Love, Bourbon Street. Eds. Herren and Willis: New York: Alyson. (2006)
- "Grit, My Love" excerpt, New York Magazine. (June 4, 2007)
- "A Scarecrow's Bible" excerpt, Lodestar Quarterly. Issue 18. (Summer 2006)
- "Kissing Montgomery Clift" in Blithe House Quarterly, 8.2. (Spring 2004)
- "Faded Rooms" in Sandbox Magazine, NYC (Spring 1997)

== Awards and nominations ==
- 2017 - Recipient, Stonewall Honor Book Award, American Library Association
- 2017 - Finalist, Lambda Literary Award Nomination, Bisexual Fiction
- 2007 - Recipient, Edmund White Award for Debut Fiction
- 2007 - Recipient, Stonewall Honor Book Award, American Library Association
- 2007 - Finalist, Lambda Literary Award
- 2007 - Finalist, Ferro-Grumley Award
- 2006 - Finalist, Violet Quill Award, Doubleday/Insight Out Book Club
- 2003 - Edward F. Albee Writing Fellowship
- 2002 - New School Chapbook Award (fiction)
