= Jonathan London (author) =

American writer of children's books (born 1947)

- Born: March 11, 1947 (age 79); New York City, U.S.
- Education: San Jose State University (M.A.)
- Spouse: Maureen Weisenberger
- Children: 2

Jonathan London (born March 11, 1947) is an American writer of children’s books, best known as the author of the popular Froggy series.

== Early life ==
London was born in Brooklyn, New York City. His father was a career Navy officer and London lived with his parents and brother Jeff on or near Navy bases all over the country, including Puerto Rico, until he was 18 years old. In college at San Jose State University he studied history and social sciences but became a poet. After receiving an MA in Social Sciences he joined a dance company in San Francisco, wrote poetry and short fiction, and travelled around the world.

== Career ==
London published around 200 poems and short stories in literary magazines, worked in a union labor job, and didn’t make a living as a children’s book author until he was 45. His first published picture books were first told to his sons when they asked him to tell them a story. Aaron was five and Sean was two. They liked his stories so much he wrote them down, and one of them became FROGGY GETS DRESSED, which became a bestseller and is on the New York Public Library 100 Picture Books Everyone Should Know list. Since then he has published over 120 books, including 30 Froggy books. Over 16 million Froggy books have sold in North America, and they are published in 8 languages, including Mandarin, Russian, Persian, Greek, and Spanish. Many Froggy titles have appeared on the New York Times and other bestseller lists.

London also writes picture books about wildlife, including Pup The Sea Otter (illustrated by his son Sean London), and has published Aaron’s Wilderness Trilogy of middle grade novels: Desolation Canyon, Bella Bella, and Grizzly Peak (illustrated by Sean London).

== Awards ==
The Froggy series and other titles by London have received numerous awards and honors, such as the New York Public Library 100 Picture Books Everyone should Know list
