= Judy Grahn Award =

American literary award

- Awarded for: Non-fiction of relevance to the lesbian community
- Sponsored by: Publishing Triangle
- Reward: US$1,000
- Established: 1997
- Website: http://www.publishingtriangle.org

The Judy Grahn Award is an annual literary award, presented by Publishing Triangle to honor works of non-fiction of relevance to the lesbian community. First presented in 1997, the award was named in honor of American poet and cultural theorist Judy Grahn.

== Recipients ==
Award winners and finalists
Year	Author	Title	Publisher	Result	Ref.
1997	Bernadette Brooten	Love Between Women		Winner	
1997	Honor Moore	White Blackbird		Finalist	
1997	Leslie Feinberg	Transgender Warriors		Finalist	
1998	Margot Peters	May Sarton		Winner	
1998	Amy Hoffman	Hospital Time		Finalist	
1998	Sherrie Inness	The Lesbian Menace		Finalist	
1999	Jack Halberstam	Female Masculinity		Winner	
1999	Alison Bechdel	The Incredible Bechdel		Finalist	
1999	Jill Johnston	Admission Accomplished		Finalist	
2000	Hilary Lapsley	Margaret Mead and Ruth Benedict: The Kinship of Women	University of Massachusetts Press	Winner	
2000	Joan Larkin (ed.)	A Woman Like That: Lesbian and Bisexual Writers Tell Their Coming Out Stories	Avon	Finalist	
2000	Lillian Faderman	To Believe in Women	Houghton Mifflin	Finalist	
2001	Amber Hollibaugh	My Dangerous Desires	Duke University Press	Winner	
2001	Bonnie J. Morris	Girl Reel	Coffee House Press	Finalist	
2001	Carole Maso	The Room Lit by Roses	Counterpoint	Finalist	
2002	Laura L. Doan	Fashioning Sapphism	Columbia University Press	Winner	
2002	Adrienne Rich	Arts of the Possible	W. W. Norton	Finalist	
2002	Suzanna Danuta Walters	All the Rage	University of Chicago Press	Finalist	
2003	Terry Wolverton	Insurgent Muse: Life and Art at the Women's Building	City Lights	Winner	
2003	Magie Dominic	The Queen of Peace Room	Wilfrid Laurier University Press	Finalist	
2003	Suzanna Rodriguez	Wild at Heart	Ecco/HarperCollins	Finalist	
2004	Lillian Faderman	Naked in the Promised Land	Houghton Mifflin	Winner	
2004	Andrew Wilson	Beautiful Shadow: A Life of Patricia Highsmith	Bloomsbury	Finalist	
2004	Casey Charles	The Sharon Kowalski Case: Lesbian and Gay Rights on Trial	University Press of Kansas	Finalist	
2005	Alison Smith	Name All the Animals	Scribner	Winner	
2005	Alexis De Veaux	Warrior Poet: A Life of Audre Lorde	W. W. Norton	Finalist	
2005	Evelyn C. White	Alice Walker	W. W. Norton	Finalist	
2006	Tania Katan	My One-Night Stand with Cancer	Alyson Books	Winner	
2006	Diana Souhami	Wild Girls	St. Martin's Press	Finalist	
2006	Gretchen Legler	On the Ice	Milkweed Editions	Finalist	
2007	Alison Bechdel	Fun Home	Houghton Mifflin	Winner	
2007	Catherine Friend	Hit by a Farm	Marlowe & Company	Finalist	
2007	Marcia Gallo	Different Daughters	Carroll & Graf	Finalist	
2008	Janet Malcolm	Two Lives: Gertrude and Alice	Yale University Press	Winner	
2008	Amy Hoffman	An Army of Ex-Lovers	University of Massachusetts Press	Finalist	
2008	Sharon Marcus	Between Women	Princeton University Press	Finalist	
2009	Andrea Weiss	In the Shadow of the Magic Mountain	University of Chicago Press	Winner	
2009	Nancy D. Polikoff	Beyond (Straight and Gay) Marriage	Beacon Press	Finalist	
2009	Regina Kunzel	Criminal Intimacy	University of Chicago Press	Finalist	
2010	Rebecca Brown	American Romances	City Lights	Winner	
2010	Joan Schenkar	The Talented Miss Highsmith	St. Martin's Press	Finalist	
2010	Mary Cappello	Called Back	Alyson Books	Finalist	
2011	Barbara Hammer	Hammer!	The Feminist Press	Winner	
2011	Emma Donoghue	Inseparable: Desire Between Women in Literature	Alfred A. Knopf	Finalist	
2011	Terry Castle	The Professor and Other Writings	Harper/HarperCollins	Finalist	
2012	Jeanne Córdova	When We Were Outlaws	Spinsters Ink	Winner	
2012	Gayle S. Rubin	Deviations: A Gayle Rubin Reader	Duke University Press	Finalist	
2012	Lisa L. Moore	Sister Arts: The Erotics of Lesbian Landscapes	University of Minnesota Press	Finalist	
2013	Alison Bechdel	Are You My Mother?	Houghton Mifflin Harcourt	Winner	
2013	Jeanette Winterson	Why Be Happy When You Can Be Normal	Grove Press	Finalist	
2013	Kate Bornstein	A Queer and Pleasant Danger	Beacon Press	Finalist	
2013	Kelly Barth	My Almost Certainly Real Imaginary Jesus	Arktoi/Red Hen	Finalist	
2014	Julia M. Allen	Passionate Commitments: The Lives of Anna Rochester and Grace Hutchins	SUNY Press	Winner	
2014	Donna Minkowitz	Growing Up Golem	Magnus Books/Riverdale Avenue	Finalist	
2014	Jennifer Finney Boylan	Stuck in the Middle with You: A Memoir of Parenting in Three Genders	Crown	Finalist	
2014	Julia Serano	Excluded: Making Feminist and Queer Movements More Inclusive	Seal Press	Finalist	
2015	Barbara Smith; edited by Alethia Jones and Virginia Eubanks	Ain't Gonna Let Nobody Turn Me Around: 40 Years of Movement Building with Barbara Smith	SUNY Press	Winner	
2015	Ariel Gore	The End of Eve	Hawthorne Books	Finalist	
2015	Daisy Hernandez	A Cup of Water Under My Bed	Beacon Press	Finalist	
2015	Kelly Cogswell	Eating Fire: My Life as a Lesbian Avenger	University of Minnesota Press	Finalist	
2016	Marcia Gallo	"No One Helped": Kitty Genovese, New York City, and the Myth of Urban Apathy	Cornell University Press	Winner	
2016	Leah Lakshmi Piepzna-Samarasinha	Dirty River: A Queer Femme of Color Dreaming Her Way Home	Arsenal Pulp Press	Finalist	
2016	Lillian Faderman	The Gay Revolution: The Story of the Struggle	Simon and Schuster	Finalist	
2016	Maggie Thrash	Honor Girl	Candlewick Press	Finalist	
2017	Sarah Schulman	Conflict Is Not Abuse	Arsenal Pulp Press	Winner	
2017	Elizabeth M. Edman	Queer Virtue	Beacon Press	Finalist	
2017	Emily K. Hobson	Lavender and Red: Liberation and Solidarity in the Gay and Lesbian Left	University of California Press	Finalist	
2018	Rosalind Rosenberg	Jane Crow: The Life of Pauli Murray	Oxford University Press	Winner	
2018	Eileen Myles	Afterglow	Grove Press	Finalist	
2018	Melissa Febos	Abandon Me	Bloomsbury USA	Finalist	
2018	Myriam Gurba	Mean	Coffee House Press	Finalist	
2019	Imani Perry	Looking for Lorraine: The Radiant and Radical Life of Lorraine Hansberry	Beacon Press	Winner	
2019	E. Patrick Johnson	Black, Queer, Southern, Women: An Oral History	University of North Carolina Press	Finalist	
2019	Jaime Harker	The Lesbian South: Southern Feminists, the Women in Print Movement, and the Queer Literary Canon	University of North Carolina Press	Finalist	
2019	Leah Lakshmi Piepzna-Samarasinha	Care Work: Dreaming Disability Justice	Arsenal Pulp Press	Finalist	
2020	Carmen Maria Machado	In the Dream House	Graywolf Press	Winner	
2020	Saidiya Hartman	Wayward Lives, Beautiful Experiments	W. W. Norton	Winner	
2020	Benjamin Moser	Sontag: Her Life and Work	Ecco	Finalist	
2020	Samra Habib	We Have Always Been Here	Viking / Penguin Canada	Finalist	
2021	Jenn Shapland	My Autobiography of Carson McCullers	Tin House	Winner	
2021	Hilary Holladay	The Power of Adrienne Rich	Nan A. Talese/Doubleday	Finalist	
2021	Julie Marie Wade	Just an Ordinary Woman Breathing	Mad Creek Books/Ohio State University Press	Finalist	
2021	Tana Wojczuk	Lady Romeo: The Radical and Revolutionary Life of Charlotte Cushman, America's First Celebrity	Avid Reader Press/Simon & Schuster	Finalist	
2022	Briona Simone Jones (ed.)	Mouths of Rain: An Anthology of Black Lesbian Thought	The New Press	Winner	
2022	Alison Bechdel	The Secret to Superhuman Strength	Mariner	Finalist	
2022	Jackie Kay	Bessie Smith: A Poet's Biography	Vintage	Finalist	
2022	Lauren Hough	Leaving Isn't the Hardest Thing	Vintage	Finalist	
2023	Raquel Gutierrez	Brown Neon	Coffee House Press	Winner	
2023	Leslie Absher	Spy Daughter, Queer Girl: In Search of Truth and Acceptance in a Family of Secrets	Latah Books	Finalist	
2023	MB Cashetta	A Cheerleader's Guide to Spiritual Enlightenment	Engine Books	Finalist	
2023	Wendy L. Rouse	Public Faces, Secret Lives: A Queer History of the Women's Suffrage Movement	NYU Press	Finalist	
2024	Barbara Jane Brickman	Suffering Sappho!: Lesbian Camp in American Popular Culture	Rutgers University Press	Winner	
2024	Cookie Woolner	The Famous Lady Lovers: Black Women and Queer Desire Before Stonewall	University of North Carolina Press	Finalist	
2024	Lamya H	Hijab Butch Blues	Dial Press	Finalist	
2024	A.V. Marraccini	We the Parasites	Sublunary Editions	Finalist	
2025	Alexis Pauline Gumbs	Survival Is a Promise: The Eternal Life of Audre Lorde	Farrar, Straus and Giroux	Winner	
2025	Sandra Gail Lambert	My Withered Legs and Other Essays	University of Georgia Press	Finalist	
2025	June Thomas	A Place of Our Own: Six Spaces that Shaped Queer Women's Culture	Seal Press Hatchett Book Group	Finalist	
2025	Sarah Leavitt	Something, Not Nothing: A Story of Grief and Love	Arsenal Pulp Press	Finalist	
2026	Sam Tabet	Beyond the Lesbian Vampire	University of Wales Press	Winner	
2026	Roza Nozari	All the Parts We Exile	Knopf Canada	Finalist	
2026	Gwen Strauss	Milena and Margarete: A Love Story in Ravensbrück	St. Martin's Press	Finalist	
2026	Jackie Domenus	No Offense: A Memoir in Essays	ELJ Editions	Finalist	
2026	Vivian Blaxell	Worthy of the Event: An Essay	LittlePuss Press	Finalist	
