= Lambda Literary Award for Lesbian Memoir or Biography =

Annual literary award

Lambda Literary Award for Lesbian Memoir/Biography
- Awarded for: Literary award
- Sponsored by: Lambda Literary Foundation
- Date: Annual
- Website: lambdaliterary.org/awards/

The Lambda Literary Award for Lesbian Memoir/Biography is an annual literary award established in 1994, presented by the Lambda Literary Foundation, to a memoir, biography, autobiography, or works of creative nonfiction by or about lesbians. Works published posthumously and/or written with co-authors are eligible, but anthologies are not.

== Recipients ==
List of Lambda Literary Award for Lesbian Memoir/Biography Recipients
Year	Author	Work	Result	Ref.
1994	Josyane Savigneau	Marguerite Yourcenar	Winner	
1994	Phyllis Burke	Family Values	Finalist	
1994	Jewelle Gomez	Forty-Three Septembers	Finalist	
1994	Rose Gladney (editor)	How Am I To Be Heard: Letters of Lillian Smith	Finalist	
1994	David Sweetman	Mary Renault	Finalist	
1995	Renate Stendhal (editor)	Gertrude Stein: In Words and Pictures	Winner	
1995	Mab Segrest	Memoir of a Race Traitor	Finalist	
1995	Elizabeth Bishop	One Art: Letters	Finalist	
1995	Colonel Margarethe Cammermeyer and Chris Fisher	Serving in Silence	Finalist	
1995	Helen Lefkowitz Horowitz	The Power and the Passion of M. Carey Thomas	Finalist	
1996	Erica Fischer	Aimee & Jaguar	Winner	
1996	Deb Price and Joyce Murdoch	And Say Hi to Joyce	Finalist	
1996	Susan Cayleff	Babe	Finalist	
1996	Claudia Brenner with Hannah Ashley	Eight Bullets	Finalist	
1996	Dorothy Allison	Two or Three Things I Know for Sure	Finalist	
1997	Doris Grumbach	Life in a Day	Winner	
1997	Candace Gingrich	Accidental Activist	Finalist	
1997	Torie Osborn	Coming Home to America	Finalist	
1997	Helen Sheehy	Eva Le Gallienne	Finalist	
1997	Honor Moore	The White Blackbird	Finalist	
1998	Barbara Wilson	Blue Windows: a Christian Science Childhood	Winner	
1998	Margot Peters	May Sarton: a Biography	Finalist	
1998	Kim Chernin	My Life as a Boy	Finalist	
1998	Daphne Scholinski and Jane Meredith Adams	The Last Time I Wore a Dress	Finalist	
1998	Hermione Lee	Virginia Woolf	Finalist	
1999	Alison Bechdel	The Indelible Alison Bechdel; Confessions, Comix, and Miscellaneous Dykes to Watch Out for	Winner	
1999	Joan Nestle	A Fragile Union	Finalist	
1999	Rodger Streitmatter	Empty Without You	Finalist	
1999	Sally Cline	Radclyffe Hall: A Woman Called John	Finalist	
1999	Kate Summerscale	The Queen of Whale Cay	Finalist	
2000	Diana Souhami	The Trials of Radclyffe Hall	Winner	
2000	Kay Turner	Baby Precious Always Shines	Finalist	
2000	Blanche Wiesen Cook	Eleanor Roosevelt: Volume 2: 1933–1938	Finalist	
2000	Barrie Jean Borich	My Lesbian Husband	Finalist	
2000	Karla Jay	Tales of the Lavender Menace	Finalist	
2001	Judith Barrington	Lifesaving	Winner	
2001	Amber Hollibaugh	My Dangerous Desires	Finalist	
2001	June Jordan	Soldier: A Poet's Childhood	Finalist	
2001	Carole Maso	The Room Lit by Roses	Finalist	
2001	Joan Schenkar	Truly Wilde	Finalist	
2007	Alison Bechdel	Fun Home	Winner	
2007	Barbara Sjoholm	Incognito Street	Finalist	
2007	Bettina Aptheker	Intimate Politics	Finalist	
2007	Hillary Carlip	Queen of the Oddballs	Finalist	
2007	Catherine Friend	Hit by a Farm	Finalist	
2008	Nicola Griffith	And Now We Are Going to Have a Party	Winner	
2008	Marusya Bociurkiw	Comfort Food for Breakups	Finalist	
2008	Amy Hoffman	An Army of Ex-Lovers	Finalist	
2008	Janet Malcolm	Two Lives: Gertrude & Alice	Finalist	
2008	Jacqueline Taylor	Waiting for the Call	Finalist	
2009	Maureen Seaton	Sex Talks to Girls: A Memoir	Winner	
2009	Susan Griffin	Wrestling with the Angel of Democracy	Finalist	
2009	Thea Hillman	Intersex (For Lack of a Better Word)	Finalist	
2009	Joanne Passet	Sex Variant Woman	Finalist	
2009	Abbe Smith	Case of a Lifetime	Finalist	
2010	Joan Schenkar	The Talented Miss Highsmith: The Secret Life and Serious Art of Patricia Highsmith	Winner	
2010	Alix Dobkin	My Red Blood: A Memoir of Growing Up Communist, Coming Onto the Greenwich Village Folk Scene, and Coming Out in the Feminist Movement	Finalist	
2010	Ariel Schrag	Likewise: The High School Comic Chronicles of Ariel Schrag	Finalist	
2010	Mary Cappello	Called Back: My Reply to Cancer, My Return to Life	Finalist	
2010	Terry Galloway	Mean Little deaf Queer	Finalist	
2011	Barbara Hammer	Hammer!: Making Movies Out of Sex and Life	Winner (tie)	
2011	Julie Marie Wade	Wishbone: A Memoir in Fractures	Winner (tie)	
2011	Katherine A. Briccetti	Blood Strangers: A Memoir	Finalist	
2011	Chely Wright	Like Me: Confessions of a Heartland Country Singer	Finalist	
2011	Amie Klempnauer Miller	She Looks Just Like You: A Memoir of (Nonbiological Lesbian) Motherhood	Finalist	
2012	Jeanne Córdova	When We Were Outlaws: A Memoir of Love & Revolution	Winner	
2012	Karleen Pendleton Jimenez	How to Get a Girl Pregnant	Finalist	
2012	Catherine Friend	Sheepish: Two Women, Fifty Sheep, and Enough Wool to Save the Planet	Finalist	
2012	Julie Marie Wade	Small Fires: Essays	Finalist	
2012	Jane Rule	Taking My Life	Finalist	
2013	Jeanette Winterson	Why Be Happy When You Could Be Normal?	Winner	
2013	Judy Grahn	A Simple Revolution: The Making of an Activist Poet	Finalist	
2013	Lisa Cohen	All We Know: Three Lives	Finalist	
2013	Alison Bechdel	Are You My Mother?: A Comic Drama	Finalist	
2013	Luisita Lopez Torregrosa	Before the Rain	Finalist	
2013	Sarah Schulman	The Gentrification of the Mind: Witness to a Lost Imagination	Finalist	
2014	Barrie Jean Borich	Body Geographic	Winner	
2014	Donna Minkowitz	Growing up Golem	Finalist	
2014	Amber Dawn	How Poetry Saved My Life: A Hustler's Memoir	Finalist	
2014	Annie Lanzillotto	L Is for Lion: An Italian Bronx Butch Freedom Memoir	Finalist	
2014	Caroline Paul and Wendy MacNaughton	Lost Cat: A True Story of Love, Desperation, and GPS Technology	Finalist	
2015	Alethia Jones and Virginia Eubanks, with Barbara Smith	Ain't Gonna Let Nobody Turn Me Around: Forty Years of Movement Building with Barbara Smith	Winner	
2015	Lynette Loeppky	Cease – a memoir of love, loss and desire	Finalist	
2015	Kelly Cogswell	Eating Fire: My Life as a Lesbian Avenger	Finalist	
2015	Ariel Gore	The End of Eve	Finalist	
2015	Terry Mutchler	Under This Beautiful Dome: A Senator, A Journalist, and the Politics of Gay Love in America	Finalist	
2016	Kate Carroll de Gutes	Objects in the Mirror Are Closer Than They Appear	Winner	
2016	Cat Cora	Cooking as Fast as I Can: A Chef's Story of Family, Food, and Forgiveness	Finalist	
2016	Leah Lakshmi Piepzna-Samarasinha	Dirty River	Finalist	
2016	Carrie Brownstein	Hunger Makes Me a Modern Girl	Finalist	
2016	Allison Gruber	You're Not Edith	Finalist	
2017	Gloria Joseph	ody, Undone: Living On After Great Pain	Winner	
2017	Ma-Nee Chacaby	A Two-Spirit Journey: The Autobiography of a Lesbian Ojibwa-Cree Elder	Finalist	
2017	Tig Notaro	I'm Just a Person	Finalist	
2017	Joanne Passet	Indomitable: The Life of Barbara Grier	Finalist	
2018	Alexandria Marzano-Lesnevich	The Fact of a Body	Winner	
2018	Melissa Febos	Abandon Me: Memoirs	Finalist	
2018	Eileen Myles	Afterglow	Finalist	
2018	Renate Stendhal	Kiss Me Again, Paris: A Memoir	Finalist	
2018	Anne-christine d'Adesky	The Pox Lover: An Activist's Decade in New York and Paris	Finalist	
2019	Zahra Patterson	Chronology	Winner	
2019	Barrie Jean Borich	Apocalypse, Darling	Finalist	
2019	Julia Van Haaften	Berenice Abbott: A Life in Photography	Finalist	
2019	Sandra Gail Lambert	A Certain Loneliness: A Memoir	Finalist	
2019	Marusya Bociurkiw	Food Was Her Country: The Memoir of a Queer Daughter	Finalist	
2019	Sarah Viren	MINE: Essays	Finalist	
2019	Esther Newton	My Butch Career: A Memoir	Finalist	
2019	Lindsay Nixon	nîtisânak	Finalist	
2020	Samra Habib	We Have Always Been Here: A Queer Muslim Memoir	Winner	
2020	Benjamin Moser	Sontag: Her Life and Work	Finalist	
2020	Saidiya Hartman	Wayward Lives, Beautiful Experiments: Intimate Histories of Social Upheaval	Finalist	
2020	Edie Windsor with Joshua Lyon	A Wild and Precious Life	Finalist	
2020	Jaquira Díaz	Ordinary Girls	Finalist	
2020	Julia Koets	The Rib Joint: A Memoir In Essays	Finalist	
2020	T Kira Madden	Long Live the Tribe of Fatherless Girls	Finalist	
2020	Elissa Altman	Motherland: A Memoir of Love, Loathing, and Longing	Finalist	
2021	Jenn Shapland	My Autobiography of Carson McCullers	Winner	
2021	Tania De Rozario	And The Walls Come Crumbling Down	Finalist	
2021	Tana Wojczuk	Lady Romeo: The Radical and Revolutionary Life of Charlotte Cushman, America's First Celebrity	Finalist	
2021	Nina Kennedy	Practicing for Love: A Memoir	Finalist	
2021	Lori Soderlind	The Change: My Great American, Postindustrial, Midlife Crisis Tour	Finalist	
2022	Sophie Santos	The One You Want to Marry (And Other Identities I've Had)	Winner	
2022	Grace Perry	The 2000s Made Me Gay: Essays on Pop Culture	Finalist	
2022	Leslie Cohen	The Audacity of a Kiss: Love, Art, and Liberation	Finalist	
2022	Jonathan Ned Katz	The Daring Life and Dangerous Times of Eve Adams	Finalist	
2022	Adele Bertei	Why Labelle Matters	Finalist	
2023	Kathryn Schulz	Lost & Found: Reflections on Grief, Gratitude, and Happiness	Winner	
2023	Raquel Gutiérrez	Brown Neon	Finalist	
2023	Putsata Reang	Ma and Me	Finalist	
2023	Chris Belcher	Pretty Baby: A Memoir	Finalist	
2023	Neema Avashia	Another Appalachia: Coming Up Queer and Indian in a Mountain Place	Finalist	
2024	Amelia Possanza	Lesbian Love Story: A Memoir in Archives	Winner	
2024	Lamya H	Hijab Butch Blues	Finalist	
2024	Vi Khi Nao	Suicide: The Autoimmune Disorder of the Psyche	Finalist	
2024	Sarah Viren	To Name the Bigger Lie	Finalist	
2024	Lynnée Denise	Why Willie Mae Thornton Matters	Finalist	
2025	Sandra Gail Lambert	My Withered Legs and Other Essays	Winner	
2025	Nikkya Hargrove	Mama: A Queer Black Woman's Story of a Family Lost and Found	Finalist	
2025	Julie Delporte	Portrait of a Body	Finalist	
2025	Julie Marie Wade	The Mary Years	Finalist	
2025	Erica N. Cardwell	Wrong is Not My Name	Finalist	
2026	Mary Frances Phillips	Black Panther Woman: The Political and Spiritual Life of Ericka Huggins	Winner	
2026	Francesca Wade	Gertrude Stein	Finalist	
2026	Michelle Young	The Art Spy: The Extraordinary Untold Tale of WWII Resistance Hero Rose Valland	Finalist	
2026	Lana Lin	The Autobiography of H. Lan Thao Lam	Finalist	
2026	Melissa Febos	The Dry Season	Finalist	
