= 22nd Lambda Literary Awards =

2010 literary awards ceremony

The 22nd Lambda Literary Awards were held in 2010, to honour works of LGBT literature published in 2009.

== Special awards ==
Category	Winner
Pioneer Award	Larry Kramer, Kate Clinton

== Nominees and winners ==
Category	Winner	Nominated
Bisexual Fiction	Mykola Dementiuk, Holy Communion; Maria Pallotta-Chiarolli, Love You Two	Bobbie Geary, The Janeid; J. E. Knowles, Arusha; Amber Lehman, Torn
Bisexual Non-Fiction	Minal Hajratwala, Leaving India: My Family's Journey From Five Villages to Five Continents	Blake Bailey, Cheever: A Life; Emanuel Levy, Vincente Minnelli: Hollywood's Dark Dreamer; Edna O'Brien, Byron in Love: A Short Daring Life; Audrey Beth Stein, Map
Gay Debut Fiction	Rakesh Satyal, Blue Boy	James Hannaham, God Says No; G. Winston James, Shaming the Devil: Collected Short Stories; James Magruder, Sugarless; Lance Reynald, Pop Salvation
Gay Erotica	Kevin Killian, Impossible Princess	Todd Gregory, ed., Rough Trade: Dangerous Gay Erotica; Richard Labonté and Lawrence Schimel, eds., I Like It Like That: True Tales of Gay Desire; James Lear, The Low Road; Sean Wolfe, Eight Inches
Gay Fiction	Vestal McIntyre, Lake Overturn	Matt Dean, The River in Winter; Peter Gadol, Silver Lake; James Morrison, Said and Done; Abdellah Taia, Salvation Army
Gay Memoir/Biography	Reynolds Price, Ardent Spirits: Leaving Home, Coming Back	Jon Ginoli, Deflowered: My Life in Pansy Division; Douglas A. Martin, Once You Go Back; David Plante, The Pure Lover: A Memoir of Grief; Edmund White, City Boy: My Life in New York During the 1960s and '70s
Gay Mystery	Michael Thomas Ford, What We Remember	Ralph Ashworth, Killer of Orchids; Josh Aterovis, All Lost Things; Rob Byrnes, Straight Lies; Greg Herren, Murder in the Garden District
Gay Poetry	Benjamin S. Grossberg, Sweet Core Orchard	Brent Goodman, The Brother Swimming Beneath Me; Tom Healy, What the Right Hand Knows; Charles Jensen, The First Risk; Randall Mann, Breakfast with Thom Gunn
Gay Romance	Frank Anthony Polito, Drama Queers!	H. Leigh Aubrey, A Keen Edge; J. P. Bowie, Time After Time; Erastes, Transgressions; Dan Stone, The Rest of Our Lives
Lesbian Debut Fiction	Rhiannon Argo, The Creamsickle	Z Egloff, Verge; Barb Johnson, More of This World or Maybe Another; Lori Ostlund, The Bigness of the World; Maida Tilchen, Land Beyond Maps
Lesbian Erotica	Sacchi Green and Rakelle Valencia, Lesbian Cowboys	Diane Anderson-Minshall, Punishment with Kisses; Ronica Black, Flesh and Bone; D. L. King, Where the Girls Are; Cecilia Tan, ed., Women of the Bite
Lesbian Fiction	Jill Malone, A Field Guide to Deception	Elana Dykewomon, Risk; Nairne Holtz, This One's Going to Last Forever; Jennifer McMahon, Dismantled; Emma Pérez, Forgetting the Alamo, or, Blood Memory
Lesbian Memoir/Biography	Joan Schenkar, The Talented Miss Highsmith: The Secret Life and Serious Art of Patricia Highsmith	Mary Cappello, Called Back: My Reply to Cancer, My Return to Life; Alix Dobkin, My Red Blood: A Memoir of Growing Up Communist, Coming Onto the Greenwich Village Folk Scene, and Coming Out in the Feminist Movement; Terry Galloway, Mean Little Deaf Queer; Ariel Schrag, Likewise: The High School Comic Chronicles of Ariel Schrag
Lesbian Mystery	Jean M. Redmann, Death of a Dying Man	Paulette Callen, Command of Silence; Josie Gordon, Toasted; Ellen Hart, The Mirror and the Mask; Joan Opyr, From Hell to Breakfast
Lesbian Poetry	Stacie Cassarino, Zero at the Bone	Samiya Bashir, Gospel: Poems; Ana Božičević, Stars of the Night Commute; Marilyn Hacker, Names; Kristin Naca, Bird Eating Bird
Lesbian Romance	Colette Moody, The Sublime and Spirited Voyage of Original Sin	Karin Kallmaker, Stepping Stone; KG MacGregor, Worth Every Step; Tracey Richardson, No Rules of Engagement; Carsen Taite, It Should Be a Crime
LGBT Anthology	Ariel Gore, ed., Portland Queer: Tales of the Rose City	Tommi Avicolli Mecca, Smash the Church, Smash the State! The Early Years of Gay Liberation; David Bergman, Gay American Autobiography: Writings from Whitman to Sedaris; Gilbert Herdt, Moral Panics, Sex Panics: Fear and the Fight Over Sexual Rights; Michael Montlack, My Diva: 65 Gay Men on the Women Who Inspire Them
LGBT Children's/Young Adult	Dale Peck, Sprout	Nick Burd, The Vast Fields of Ordinary; Michael Cart, How Beautiful the Ordinary; Malinda Lo, Ash; P. E. Ryan, In Mike We Trust
LGBT Drama	Mart Crowley, The Collected Plays of Mart Crowley	Bonnie J. Morris, Revenge of the Women's Studies Professor; Kate Moira Ryan and Linda S. Chapman, The Beebo Brinker Chronicles
LGBT Non-Fiction	James Davidson, The Greeks and Greek Love	Nathaniel Frank, Unfriendly Fire: How the Gay Ban Undermines the Military and Weakens America; Drewey Wayne Gunn, The Golden Age of Gay Fiction; Audre Lorde (Rudolph P. Byrd, Johnnetta Betsch Cole and Beverly Guy-Sheftall, eds.), I Am Your Sister: Collected and Unpublished Writings of Audre Lorde; Sarah Schulman, Ties That Bind: Familial Homophobia and Its Consequences
LGBT Science Fiction/Fantasy/Horror	Catherynne M. Valente, Palimpsest	Tom Cardamone, Pumpkin Teeth; Amber Dawn, Fist of the Spider Woman; Rebecca Ore, Centuries Ago and Very Fast; Lee Thomas, In the Closet, Under the Bed
LGBT Studies	Margot Canaday, The Straight State: Sexuality and Citizenship in Twentieth Century America	Julie Abraham, Metropolitan Lovers: The Homosexuality of Cities; Deborah B. Gould, Moving Politics: Emotion and ACT UP's Fight Against AIDS; Armando Maggi, The Resurrection of the Body: Pier Paolo Pasolini from Saint Paul to Sade; Kathleen Bond Stockton, The Queer Child, or Growing Sideways in the Twentieth Century
Transgender Literature	Lynn Breedlove, Lynnee Breedlove's One Freak Show	S. Bear Bergman, The Nearest Exit May Be Behind You; Kari Edwards, Bharat Jiva; Joy Ladin, Transmigration; Adam Lowe, Troglodyte Rose
