= Carson McCullers =

American writer (1917–1967)

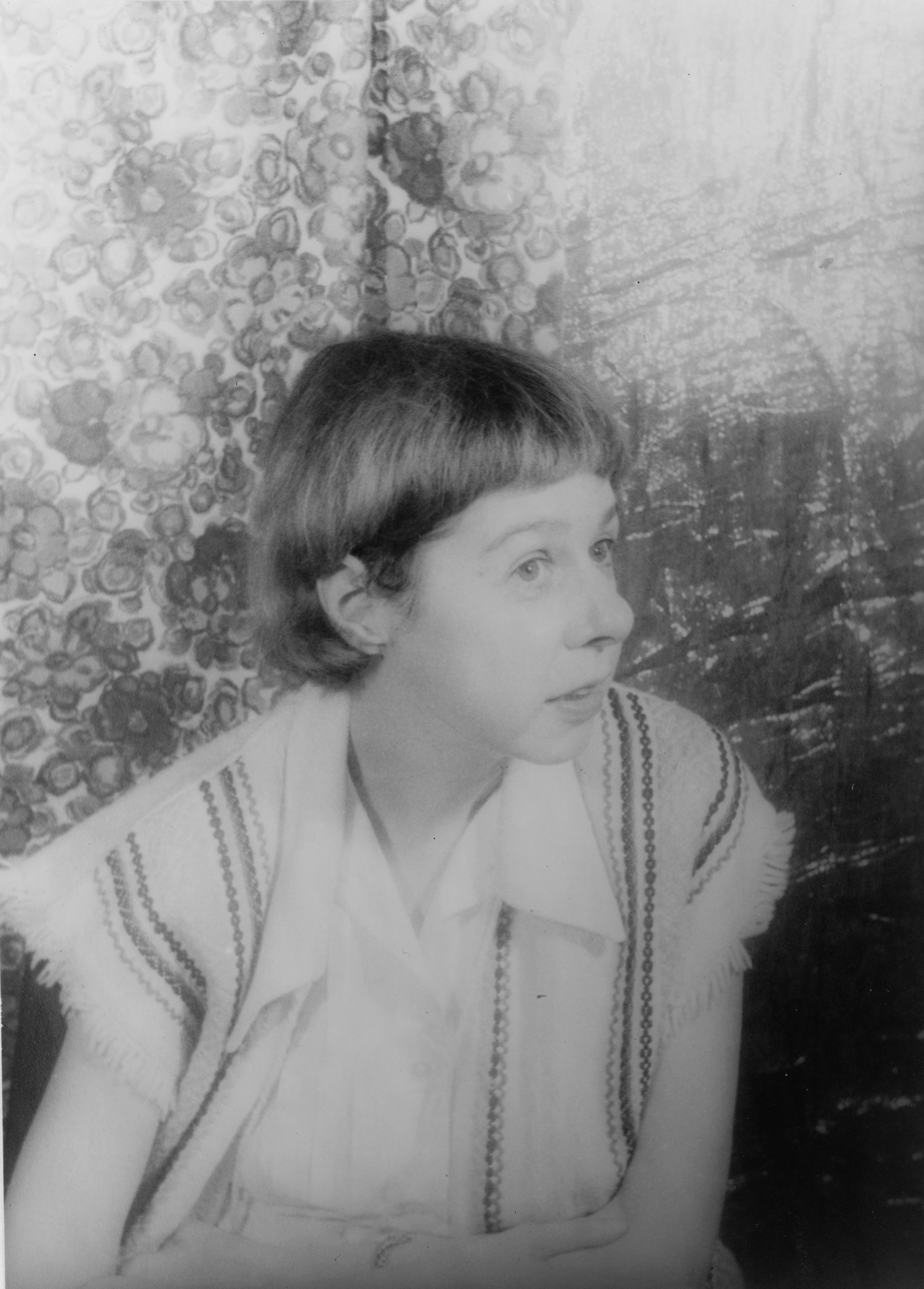
- McCullers, photographed by Carl Van Vechten, 1959
- Born: Lula Carson Smith; February 19, 1917; Columbus, Georgia, U.S.
- Died: September 29, 1967 (aged 50); Nyack, New York, U.S.
- Education: Columbia University
- Occupation: Novelist
- Writing career
- Genre: Southern Gothic
- Notable works: The Heart Is a Lonely Hunter; The Ballad of the Sad Café; The Member of the Wedding

Carson McCullers (February 19, 1917 – September 29, 1967) was an American novelist, short-story writer, playwright, essayist, and poet. Her first novel, The Heart Is a Lonely Hunter (1940), explores the spiritual isolation of misfits and outcasts in a small town of the Southern United States. Her other novels have similar themes. Most are set in the Deep South.

McCullers's work is often described as Southern Gothic and indicative of her Southern roots. Critics also describe her writing and eccentric characters as universal in scope. Her stories have been adapted to stage and film. A stage adaptation of her novel The Member of the Wedding (1946), which captures a young girl's feelings at her brother's wedding, made a successful Broadway run in 1950–51.

== Early life ==
McCullers was born Lula Carson Smith in Columbus, Georgia, in 1917 to Lamar Smith, a jeweler, and Marguerite Waters. She was named after her maternal grandmother, Lula Carson Waters. She had a younger brother, Lamar Jr. and a younger sister, Marguerite. Her great grandfather on her mother's side was a planter and Confederate soldier. Her father was a watchmaker and jeweler of French Huguenot descent. From the age of ten, she took piano lessons; when she was fifteen, her father gave her a typewriter to encourage her story writing.

Smith graduated from Columbus High School. In September 1934, at age 17, she left home on a steamship bound for New York City, planning to study piano at the Juilliard School of Music. On the subway she lost the money she was going to use for her education at Juilliard. She decided instead to work, take night classes, and write. She worked several odd jobs, including as a waitress and a dog walker. After falling ill with rheumatic fever, she returned to Columbus to recuperate, and she changed her mind about studying music. Returning to New York, she worked in menial jobs while pursuing a writing career; she attended night classes at Columbia University and studied creative writing under Texas writer Dorothy Scarborough and with Sylvia Chatfield Bates at Washington Square College of New York University. In 1936, she published her first work, "Wunderkind", an autobiographical piece that Bates admired, depicting a music prodigy's adolescent insecurity and losses. It first appeared in Story magazine and is collected in The Ballad of the Sad Café.

From 1935 to 1937, as her studies and health dictated, she divided her time between Columbus and New York. In September 1937, aged 20, she married an ex-soldier and aspiring writer, Reeves McCullers. A New Yorker profile described her husband as "a dreamer attracted to big, capable women". They began their married life in Charlotte, North Carolina, where Reeves had found work as a credit salesman. The couple made a pact to take alternating turns as writer then breadwinner, starting with Reeves's taking a salaried position while McCullers wrote. Her eventual success as a writer precluded his literary ambitions.

== Career ==
Maxim Lieber was McCullers's literary agent in 1938 and intermittently thereafter. In 1940, at the age of 23, writing in the Southern Gothic or perhaps Southern realist traditions, McCullers completed her first novel, The Heart Is a Lonely Hunter. The title was suggested by her editor and was taken from the poem "The Lonely Hunter" by the Scottish poet Fiona MacLeod. At the time the novel was thought to suggest an anti-Fascist message.

After completing The Heart Is a Lonely Hunter in 1939 (then titled The Mute), McCullers and her husband moved to Fayetteville, North Carolina, where she completed Reflections in a Golden Eye (then titled Army Post) in the span of two months. She sold the book to Harper's Bazaar for five hundred dollars in August 1940. It was published in two parts in the magazine in October and November.

With influences such as Isak Dinesen, Dostoevsky, Chekhov, and Tolstoy, she published eight books; the best known are The Heart Is a Lonely Hunter (1940), Reflections in a Golden Eye (1941) and The Member of the Wedding (1946). The novella The Ballad of the Sad Café (1951) depicts loneliness and the pain of unrequited love; at the time of its writing, McCullers was a resident at Yaddo, the artists' colony in Saratoga Springs, New York.

In The Member of the Wedding, McCullers describes the feelings of a young girl at her brother's wedding. The Broadway stage adaptation of the novel had a successful run in 1950–51 and was produced by the Young Vic in London in September 2007. The original production won the New York Drama Critics' Circle Award for the best play of the season.

Two of her works were adapted into films, neither of which she lived to see. The Heart Is a Lonely Hunter was adapted as a film with the same title in 1968, with Alan Arkin in the lead role. Earlier Reflections in a Golden Eye was directed by John Huston (1967) and starred Marlon Brando and Elizabeth Taylor. McCullers died a fortnight before that film's premiere in October 1967. Huston, in his autobiography, An Open Book (1980), wrote of her:

I first met Carson McCullers during the war when I was visiting Paulette Goddard and Burgess Meredith in upstate New York. Carson lived nearby, and one day when Buzz and I were out for a walk she hailed us from her doorway. She was then in her early 20s, and had already suffered the first of a series of strokes. I remember her as a fragile thing with great shining eyes, and a tremor in her hand as she placed it in mine. It wasn't palsy, rather a quiver of animal timidity. But there was nothing timid or frail about the manner in which Carson McCullers faced life. And as her afflictions multiplied, she only grew stronger.

Richard Wright, the author of Black Boy, reviewed her first novel, published in 1940 when she was 23, and said she was the first white writer to create fully human black characters. In his review 'Hugo: Secrets of the Inner Landscape', he stated:

To me the most impressive aspect of The Heart Is a Lonely Hunter is the astonishing humanity that enables a white writer, for the first time in Southern fiction, to handle Negro characters with as much ease and justice as those of her own race. This cannot be accounted for stylistically or politically; it seems to stem from an attitude toward life which enables Miss McCullers to rise above the pressures of her environment and embrace white and black humanity in one sweep of apprehension and tenderness.

== Later life ==
Carson and Reeves McCullers divorced in 1941. After separating from Reeves she moved to New York to live with George Davis, the editor of Harper's Bazaar. She became a member of February House, an art commune in Brooklyn. Among her friends were W. H. Auden, Benjamin Britten, Gypsy Rose Lee and the writer couple Paul Bowles and Jane Bowles. After World War II McCullers lived mostly in Paris. Her close friends during these years included Truman Capote and Tennessee Williams. During this period of separation, Reeves had a relationship with the composer David Diamond, and the two lived together in Rochester, New York.

McCullers fell in love with a number of women and pursued them sexually with great determination. Her most documented and extended love obsession was with Annemarie Clarac-Schwarzenbach, of whom she once wrote "She had a face that I knew would haunt me for the rest of my life." Letters written to McCullers from Clarac-Schwarzenbach are at the Harry Ransom Center at the University of Texas at Austin. In her autobiography, McCullers reports that the two shared one kiss. McCullers's passion, however, was not reciprocated, and the two remained friends with McCullers dedicating her next novel, Reflections in a Golden Eye, to her. Sarah Schulman writes:

There is the infamous obsession with Katherine Anne Porter and a much-implied ongoing "friendship" with Gypsy Rose Lee. But if Carson ever actually had sex with a woman, even Tennessee [Williams] didn't hear of it. According to McCullers's brilliant biographer, Virginia Spencer Carr, Carson did brag to her male cousin that she'd had sex with Gypsy once. But if that was the case, she never mentioned it to any of her gay friends. In the absence of reciprocated lesbian love and the inability to consummate lesbian sex, McCullers still wore a lesbian persona in literature and in life. She clearly wrote against the grain of heterosexual convention, wore men's clothes, was outrageously aggressive in her consistently failed search for sex and love with another woman, and formed primary friendships with other gay people.

In 1945, Carson and Reeves McCullers remarried. Three years later, while severely depressed, she attempted suicide. In 1953, Reeves tried to persuade her to commit suicide with him, but she fled and Reeves killed himself in their Paris hotel with an overdose of sleeping pills. Her bittersweet play The Square Root of Wonderful (1957) drew upon these traumatic experiences. In the 1950s, McCullers was in therapy for a variety of reasons, and discussed with her therapist, Dr. Mary A. Mercer, the possibility of being a lesbian.

McCullers dictated her unfinished autobiography, Illumination and Night Glare (1999), during the final months of her life. Her home from 1945 to 1967 in South Nyack, New York, was listed on the National Register of Historic Places in 2006.

== Death ==
McCullers suffered throughout her life from several illnesses and from alcoholism. At the age of 15, she contracted rheumatic fever, which resulted in rheumatic heart disease. As a result of the heart damage sustained, McCullers suffered from strokes that began in her youth. In 1962, she had a breast cancer surgery and mastectomy. She lived the last twenty years of her life in Nyack, New York, where she died on September 29, 1967, at the age of 50, after a brain hemorrhage. She is buried in Oak Hill Cemetery.

== Criticism ==
McCullers's style is often described as Southern Gothic, as the majority of her works take place in the Southern United States and feature eccentric characters suffering from loneliness interspersed by moments of deep empathy. In a discussion with the Irish critic and writer Terence de Vere White, McCullers said, "Writing, for me, is a search for God". Other critics have variously detected tragicomic or political elements in her writing.

The most recent scholarly collection of commentaries on her work is Carson McCullers in the Twenty-First Century (2016), edited by Graham-Bertolini and Kayser.

== Legacy ==
McCullers's childhood home in Columbus, Georgia, is now owned by Columbus State University and is the central location of the university's Carson McCullers Center for Writers and Musicians. The center is dedicated to preserving the legacy of McCullers; to nurturing American writers and musicians; to educating young people; and to fostering the literary and musical life of Columbus, the state of Georgia, and the American South. To that end, the center operates a museum in the Smith–McCullers' home, presents extensive educational and cultural programs for the community, maintains an ever-growing archive of materials related to the life and work of McCullers, and offers fellowships for writers and composers who live for periods of time in the Smith-McCullers home in Columbus.

While the center operates out of the Smith–McCullers house, the writer's childhood home and museum is open to the public.

In 1944, when McCullers's father died, her mother left Columbus and moved to Nyack, New York, where she bought her daughter's famed Nyack home. McCullers lived with her mother and sister off and on in this house for a number of years, eventually buying the house from her mother. McCullers was living in this house when she died in 1967. In December 2006 the house in Nyack was added to the National Register of Historic Places.

McCullers's therapist and longtime friend, Dr. Mary E. Mercer, bequeathed the house in Nyack to Columbus State University's Carson McCullers Center for Writers and Musicians, the same center that owns and operates out of McCullers's childhood home in Columbus, Georgia. At Dr. Mercer's death in late April 2013, the McCullers Center inherited not only the house but also many artifacts and documents that shed light on the last ten years of McCullers's life.

The two former McCullers houses now owned by Columbus State University together contain the world's most extensive research collection on the author.

The Rainey-McCullers School of the Arts in Columbus, Georgia, is named in honor of McCullers and fellow Columbus native Ma Rainey.

Charles Bukowski wrote a poem about Carson McCullers.

She influenced Edward Albee, who adapted her novella The Ballad of the Sad Cafe into a play.

In 2020, American writer Jenn Shapland published My Autobiography of Carson McCullers, which recounts Shapland's discovery of McCullers' letters to Swiss writer Annemarie Schwarzenbach. Shapland's book contends McCullers was queer, or closeted. Other critics have noted that "McCullers camouflaged her love for women in her fiction, [and] gay and lesbian themes are inarguably present in her work." Mary Dearborn published her book, Carson McCullers: A Life, in 2024.

== Works ==
=== Novels ===
- The Heart Is a Lonely Hunter. Boston: Houghton Mifflin Co. 1940. LCCN 40010298. Limited preview at Google books.
- Reflections in a Golden Eye. Boston: Houghton Mifflin Co. 1941. LCCN 41002706. Limited preview at Google books.
- The Member of the Wedding. Boston: Houghton Mifflin Co. 1946. LCCN 46002022. Limited preview at Google books.
- Clock Without Hands. Boston: Houghton Mifflin Co. 1961. LCCN 61010351.

=== Other works ===
- The Ballad of the Sad Café: The Novels and Stories of Carson McCullers. Boston: Houghton Mifflin Co. 1951. LCCN 51010969. A collection comprising:
  - a novella of the same title, later made into a Merchant Ivory film
  - six short stories:
    - "Wunderkind" (Story, 1936)
    - "The Jockey" (The New Yorker, 1941)
    - "Madame Zilensky and the King of Finland" (The New Yorker, 1941)
    - "The Sojourner" (Mademoiselle, 1950)
    - "A Domestic Dilemma" (New York Post magazine section, September 16, 1951)
    - "A Tree, a Rock, a Cloud" (Harper's Bazaar, 1942)
- The Member of the Wedding. New York: New Directions. 1951. LCCN 51010532. A 1950 play adapted from the 1946 novel
- The Square Root of Wonderful, A Play in Three Acts. New York: French. 1958. LCCN 59001296.
- Sweet as a Pickle and Clean as a Pig. Boston: Houghton Mifflin Co. 1964. LCCN 64020538. A collection of poems illustrated by Rolf Gérard.
- The Mortgaged Heart (1972), a posthumous collection of writings, edited by her sister Rita
- Collected Stories (1987)
- Illumination and Night Glare (1999), her unfinished autobiography, published more than 30 years after her death

=== Collections ===
- Dews, Carlos L., ed. (2001). Complete Novels. New York: Library of America. ISBN 978-1-931082-03-7.
- Dews, Carlos L., ed. (2017). Stories, Plays, & Other Writings. New York: Library of America. ISBN 978-1-59853-511-2.

=== Recording ===
- Carson McCullers Reads from The Member of the Wedding and Other of her Works. New York: MGM Records. 1958. LCCN 89741503.

== See also ==
- Lover, Beloved: Songs from an Evening with Carson McCullers, a 2016 album by American singer/songwriter Suzanne Vega.

== In popular culture ==
The personal effects of McCullers which are held in the Harry Ransom Center at the University of Texas, Austin, were the subject of an essay titled "Finders Keepers" written by writer/archivist Jenn Shapland, which earned her a Pushcart Prize. Shapland also wrote a book partially inspired by McCullers, titled My Autobiography of Carson McCullers, which also serves as a memoir for Shapland. For that book, she won several awards, including a Lambda.

Writer and AIDS activist Sarah Schulman wrote a play loosely based on McCullers's life, which she called Carson McCullers (Historically Inaccurate). The play ran at the Women's Project Theater in New York from January 10 to February 03, 2002. It was directed by Marion McClinton. Schulman's play mainly depicted the tumultuous relationship between Carson and Reeves McCullers, but also touches upon the emotionally fraught relationships with women that defined Carson's life, including her early attachment to her piano teacher, and later relationship with Gypsy Rose Lee.
