= Gay Community News (Boston) =

American weekly newspaper for the LGBT community

- Type: LGBTQ weekly
- Owner: The Bromfield Street Educational Foundation
- Founded: 1973
- Ceased publication: 1999
- Language: English
- Headquarters: Boston, Massachusetts
- ISSN: 0147-0728

Gay Community News (GCN) was an American weekly newspaper published in Boston, Massachusetts from 1973 to 1999. Designed as a resource for the LGBT community, the newspaper reported a wide variety of gay and lesbian-related news.

Founded as a collectively-run, local newsletter, early in the struggle for gay liberation, it was soon expanded into a major newspaper with an international readership. The publication saw itself as part an important vehicle for debating gay rights, feminism, antiracism, multiculturalism, class struggle, prisoners' rights, AIDS, and other causes. The newspaper's influence was such that it enjoyed a "national reach that was considered the movement's 'paper of record' throughout the '70s, and whose alumni at one point occupied so many leadership roles around the country that they were called the 'GCN mafia'".

The newspaper's political stance was reflected throughout its reporting. It often served as a place in which liberals and radicals in LGBT groups debated conflicting agendas. An article entitled "Gay Revolutionary", published in 1987, led to claims from the conservative right that the newspaper promoted a "homosexual agenda" to destroy heterosexuality and traditional values.

The collective published the paper once per week from June 1973 to July 1992, when it temporarily ceased publication. It was then revived with a much smaller staff of new editors and student journalists, who published issues sporadically until its last issue in 1999.

== History ==
=== Early history ===
The premier issue of Gay Community News was published out of the Charles Street Meeting House on June 17, 1973, as a two-page mimeograph, at first titled "Gay Community Newsletter". In less than a year, Gay Community News developed from a two-page mimeograph to an eight-page, tabloid-style newsprint, and moved its office to 22 Bromfield Street. The first issue was loosely organized into sections titled Events, Volunteers, Needs, Notices, and Directory. The editors introduced the very first newsletter by stating:

"There has been a long standing need in the Boston gay community for improved communication between the various gay organizations and gay individuals. The lack of coverage in the "straight" press has added to this problem of getting necessary information to our community. Gay groups have attempted to overcome this problem by newsletters to their members, but this has led to duplicated efforts with vast portions of the community left uninformed events until after they have passed." The Gay Community Newsletter is meant to solve this problem. The purpose will be to list all of the events and information of interest to the gay community in one publication. This will not be a literary publication. We are fortunate to already have several serving the community. We feel weekly publication will be necessary to fill this need for quick current information.

On March 8, 1975, the newspaper made two major changes: it began distributing color copies, and publishers expanded distribution to a regional level. In 1978, the membership of Gay Community News voted to become a national newspaper in both its focus and distribution.

=== Office Fire ===
In the early morning of July 7, 1982, a fire broke out at the paper's office at 22 Bromfield Street. The entire office was destroyed, along with that of Fag Rag, another publication to whom GCN subletted part of their office. Glad Day Bookshop, a bookstore across the hall, was also destroyed. Both publications were forced out of the Bromfield Street office; GCN moved to 167 Tremont Street until 1992 when it temporarily ceased publication.

The Boston Fire Department Arson Squad investigated the incident, and many staff members of the paper believed the fire to be arson. The building was set on fire by a group of firemen, policemen and security guards, who had set a number of fires in the city. (Note: View of the façade of at 22 Bromfield Street where Gay Community News and Fag Rag had its offices above.) According to testimony from two of the arsonists, the arson ring set over 200 fires in 1982 and 1983, mostly in Boston. They claimed their motive was to scare Boston voters into repealing Proposition 21, a state tax-limiting measure which would lay off or freeze hiring of firefighters. The group of arsonists were ultimately held responsible for the destruction of more than $50 million worth of property, and at the time, the arson case was considered to be the largest in state or federal history. As a result of the fire, much documentation from the paper’s first ten years was lost.

== Paper Organization ==
Gay Community News was established and operated as a collective. At first, most major decisions were made by votes of the entire membership, though by 1978 it had moved to a committee structure for things like hiring new editors. “Membership” was defined very broadly, and local readers and members of the queer community were encouraged to assist in the paper’s production. For example, every Friday evening, volunteers known as “Friday folders” would come to the GCN offices to assist in stuffing the papers into envelopes to be mailed to subscribers.

GCN was primarily funded through subscriptions and through advertising from local queer businesses. Unlike most others in its genre, the paper did not solicit advertisements from gay bars, which was a popular source of revenue for queer newspapers at the time. In another anomaly for its genre, GCN employed and wrote for an audience of both gay men and lesbians. During this time, most queer publications either focused on one group or the other, but GCN was one of a few exceptions along with Toronto’s The Body Politic.

== Influential Contributions ==
=== "Gay Revolutionary" article ===
In 1987, Michael Swift published an article in the Gay Community News entitled "Gay Revolutionary". The newspaper's editors had requested that Swift write an article as satirical proof of the so-called "gay agenda" that conservative right-wing Christians were establishing. Thirty years after the article's publishing date, conservative religious groups continue to quote "Gay Revolutionary", but omit the crucial first line of the piece, "This essay is an outré, madness, a tragic, cruel fantasy, an eruption of inner rage, on how the oppressed desperately dream of being the oppressor." The original article has come to be known as The Homosexual Manifesto.

=== Prisoner Project ===
The Prisoner Project was initiated in 1975, coming as a result of the staff member Mike Riegle, who responded to letters sent by prisoners to the Gay Community News and granted them free newspaper subscriptions. The project grew to a larger scale, with The Bromfield Street Educational Foundation sending prisoners books, providing legal assistance, and receiving and publishing letters and about homophobia, racism, and sexism in prisons. In 1977, The Bromfield Street Educational Foundation and the National Gay Task Force joined together to sue the federal prison system and won the right for prisoners to receive gay publications in jail. Although the verdict came in 1980, The Bromfield Street Educational Foundation continued to spend subsequent years advocating on behalf of prisoners who were denied copies of the Gay Community News and other LGBTQ publications. Starting in 1981, a regular prisoners' column was published in every edition of the Gay Community News.

=== Terminology ===
Concerning the naming of the publication, Amy Hoffman, in Army of Ex-Lovers, writes,

In 1973, when the paper was founded, each word in our name, Gay Community News had contained within it an entire political statement:

Gay: The early gay organizations of the 1950s and 1960s had used the most arcane kinds of references in their names so their nature would be clear only to initiates: the Mattachine Society, the Daughters of Bilitis. Even organizations founded later had names that were obscure, quaint, or bland: the Lambda Legal Defense and Education Fund; the Homophile Community Health Service; the Human Rights Campaign Fund.

Community: Although it may seem too obvious for comment now, the claim that gays were a class of people with a common culture and interests - rather than isolated cases of perversion - was revolutionary, the heart of the gay liberation movement.

News: Not only that, but the things we did together and as individuals were noteworthy, interesting, and had an audience.

All of this was taking place during a time when even the word "gay" was still controversial. "Gay" had been adopted as a unifying term by radical groups like the Gay Liberation Front, but the mainstream press still used the term "homosexual", when they would discuss the community at all. The New York Times, for example, continued to use "homosexual", refusing to use the word "gay" until 1987.

== End of the newspaper ==
By 1991, the newspaper "was the oldest, continuously published gay newspaper that had a national audience." It had ten people on staff and was publishing issues of 20 pages. In spite of "a strong readership", it had financial difficulties. As a result, it stopped publishing on July 3, 1992. The revived Gay Community News was published bimonthly as a 28- to 32-page tabloid-style publication. In April 1993, the first new edition of the paper was distributed at the gay pride march in Washington, D.C. The final issue of the Gay Community News was published in 1999.

== In media ==
=== Literature ===
- Regular contributor Amy Hoffman wrote of her time at the newspaper in her 2007 book An Army of Ex-Lovers: My Life at the Gay Community News.
- Maida Tilchen wrote of her time at Gay Community News in the 2012 anthology Gay Press, Gay Power: The Growth of LGBT Community Newspapers in America.

=== Podcasts ===
- Former Gay Community News employee and LGBTQ+ activist Nancy Walker is interviewed about her experiences working for the paper on Season 6, Episode 4 of Making Gay History.

=== Panels ===
- The History Project in partnership with the Massachusetts Historical Society hosted a series of panels to celebrate the 50th anniversary of Gay Community News in 2023
  - Defining GCN with Loie Hayes, Gordon Gottlieb, Russ Lopez
  - Content, Controversy, and Coverage with Amy Hoffman, Gayle Rubin, Chris Guilfoy, Craig Bailey, and Chris Bull.
  - GCNs Impact and Legacy with Gerard Cabrera, Gilda Bruckman, Haden Smiley, Moderated by Michael Bronski

== See also ==
- List of newspapers in Massachusetts
- List of LGBT periodicals
