= 12th Lambda Literary Awards =

2000 literary awards ceremony

The 12th Lambda Literary Awards were held in 2000 to honour works of LGBT literature published in 1999.

== Nominees and winners ==
Category	Winner	Nominated
Anthologies/Fiction	Naomi Holoch, Joan Nestle, and Nancy Holden, eds., Vintage Book of International Lesbian Fiction	Jaime Manrique and Jesse Dorris, Besame Mucho: New Gay Latino Fiction; Robert Drake and Terry Wolverton, Hers 3; Robert Drake and Terry Wolverton, His 3; Emma Donoghue, Mammoth Book of Lesbian Short Stories
Anthologies/Non-Fiction	Steve Hogan and Lee Hudson, eds., Completely Queer: The Gay and Lesbian Encyclopedia; Kris Kleindienst, ed., This Is What Lesbian Looks Like	Joan Larkin, A Woman Like That; Larry Gross and James D. Woods, Columbia Reader on Lesbians and Gay Men in Media, Society and Politics; Charles Michael Smith, Fighting Words
Children's/Young Adult	Ellen Wittlinger, Hard Love	Paula Boock, Dare Truth or Promise; Lois-Ann Yamanaka, Name Me Nobody; William Taylor, The Blue Lawn; Nancy Garden, The Year They Burned the Books
Drama	Craig Lucas, What I Meant Was	Terrence McNally, Corpus Christi; Laurence Senelick, Lovesick; Deb Margolin, Of All the Nerve; Steven Watson, Prepare for Saints: Gertrude Stein, Virgil Thomson, and the Mainstreaming of American Modernism
Gay Biography/Autobiography	Jesse Green, The Velveteen Father	Gad Beck, An Underground Life; Mark Doty, Firebird; Fred Kaplan, Gore Vidal; Martin Duberman, Left Out: The Politics of Exclusion
Gay Fiction	Matthew Stadler, Allan Stein	Jim Grimsley, Comfort and Joy; Andrew Holleran, In September, the Light Changes; Felice Picano, The Book of Lies; Paul Russell, The Coming Storm
Gay Mystery	John Morgan Wilson, Justice at Risk	Mark Richard Zubro, Drop Dead; R. D. Zimmerman, Innuendo; Lev Raphael, The Death of a Constant Lover; Keith Hartman, The Gumshoe, the Witch, and the Virtual Corpse
Gay Poetry	Mark Wunderlich, The Anchorage; Richard Howard, Trappings	Rafael Campo, Diva; Marvin K. White, Last Rights; G. Winston James, Lyric
Gay Studies	James Saslow, Pictures and Passions: A History of Homosexuality in the Visual Arts	John Howard, Men Like That: A Southern Queer History; Robin Hardy and David Groff, The Crisis of Desire; Edward Stein, The Mismeasure of Desire; Samuel R. Delany, Times Square Red, Times Square Blue
Humor	Michael Thomas Ford, That's Mr. Faggot To You	Eric Orner, Ethan Exposed; Bob Smith, Way to Go Smith!; Scott Brassart and Julie K. Trevelyan, Wilma Loves Betty and Other Hilarious Gay & Lesbian Parodies; Jennifer Camper, Subgurlz
Lesbian Biography/Autobiography	Diana Souhami, The Trials of Radclyffe Hall	Kay Turner, Baby Precious Always Shines; Blanche Wiesen Cook, Eleanor Roosevelt: Volume 2 1933-1938; Barrie Jean Borich, My Lesbian Husband; Karla Jay, Tales of the Lavender Menace
Lesbian Fiction	Sarah Waters, Tipping the Velvet	Anna Livia, Bruised Fruit; (Mary) Terri De la Peña, Faults; Barbara Wilson, Salt Water and Other Stories; Elizabeth Stark, Shy Girl
Lesbian Mystery	Ellen Hart, Hunting the Witch	J. M. Redmann, Lost Daughters; Claire McNab, Murder Undercover; Mary Wings, She Came in Drag; Katherine V. Forrest, Sleeping Bones
Lesbian Poetry	Olga Broumas, Rave	Brenda Shaughnessy, Interior With Sudden Joy; Adrienne Rich, Midnight Salvage; Rita Wong, Monkeypuzzle; Minnie Bruce Pratt, Walking Back Up Depot Street
Lesbian Studies	Lillian Faderman, To Believe in Women: What Lesbians Have Done for America	Leila J. Rupp, A Desired Past: A Short History of Same-Sex Love in America; Bonnie J. Morris, Eden Built by Eves; Jaye Zimet, Strange Sisters; Felice Newman, The Whole Lesbian Sex Book: A Passionate Guide for All of Us
Religion/Spirituality	John R. Stowe, Gay Spirit Warrior; Keith Boykin, Respecting the Soul	Christian de la Huerta, Coming Out Spiritually; Stuart Howell Miller, Prayer Warriors; Winston Leyland, Queer Dharma 2
Science fiction, fantasy or horror	Richard Bowe, Minions of the Moon	Victoria Brownworth and Judith Redding, Night Shade: Gothic Tales by Women; Severna Park, The Annunciate; Keith Hartman, The Gumshoe, the Witch, and the Virtual Corpse; Delia Sherman, Through a Brazen Mirror
Small Press	Henry Flesh, Massage	Emanuel Xavier, Christ-Like; Giovanna Capone, Denise Nico Leto and Tommi Avicolli Mecca, Hey Paesan: Writing by Lesbians and Gay Men of Italian Descent; Robin Lippincott, Mr. Dalloway; Paul Harris, The Queer Press Guide
Transgender/Bisexual	Jackie Kay, Trumpet	Deirdre McCloskey, Crossing; Jacobo Schifter, From Toads to Queens; Del LaGrace Volcano and Judith Halberstam, The Drag King Book; Jason Cromwell, Transmen and FTMs
Visual Arts	James Saslow, Pictures and Passions: A History of Homosexuality in the Visual Arts	David Leddick, The Homoerotic Art of Pavel Tchelitchev; John Esten and Donna Hassler, John Singer Sargent: The Male Nudes; Jaye Zimet, Strange Sisters; Del LaGrace Volcano and Judith Halberstam, The Drag King Book
