= Julie Marie Wade =

American writer

Julie Marie Wade (born 1979) is an American writer and professor of creative writing. Wade has received numerous awards for her writing, most notably winning the Lambda Literary Award for Lesbian Memoir or Biography in 2011 for her book Wishbone.

== Biography ==
Wade was born in Seattle, Washington in 1979 and came out as gay in 2002 at the age of 23. She currently lives with her wife, in Hollywood, Florida.

== Education ==
Wade received a Bachelor of Arts in 2000 from the University of London, where she studied English and Psychology. She then attended Western Washington University, where she graduated with a Master of Arts in English, as well as a graduate certificate in Composition Studies, in 2003. In 2006, she received a Master of Fine Arts in Poetry and a graduate certificate in Women's Studies from the University of Pittsburgh in 2006. She later studied Interdisciplinary Humanities at the University of Louisville, receiving a Doctor of Philosophy in 2012.

== Career ==
Aside from writing, Wade has worked at many educational institutions: Western Washington University, Arlington Elementary School in Pittsburgh, University of Pittsburgh, Carlow University, Olney Friends School, the University of Louisville, and Florida International University.

Wade currently serves as an Associate Professor of Creative Writing at Florida International University in Miami. She has received grants from the Kentucky Arts Council and the Barbara Deming Memorial Fund.

== Awards ==
Wade has been a finalist and winner of many writing prizes, some of which are noted in the table below.

Year	Title	Award	Result	Ref.
2005	"Lying in Bed"	Oscar Wilde Award	Won	
2009	"Four Eyes in a Dark Room"	Mary C. Mohr Nonfiction Award, Southern Indiana Review	2nd Prize	
2011	Wishbone	Lambda Literary Award for Lesbian Memoir or Biography	Won	
2012	Small Fires	Lambda Literary Award for Lesbian Memoir or Biography	Nominated	
2012	Tremolo	Bloom Nonfiction Chapbook Prize	Won	
2012	“Meditation 32”	Thomas Wilhelmus Award in Creative Nonfiction, Southern Indiana Review	Nominated	
2012	Six	Idaho Prize for Poetry	Nominated	
2014	Six	A Room of Her Own Foundation's To The Lighthouse Prize	Won	
2014	“Trilogy”	Robert and Adele Schiff Award in Prose, The Cincinnati Review	Honorable mention	
2015	When I Was Straight	Over the Rainbow List	Selection	
2015	“Source Amnesia”	Spoon River Editors’ Prize in Poetry	Won	
2016	“Meditation 36”	Thomas Wilhelmus Award in Creative Nonfiction, Southern Indiana Review	Won	
2019	“503A”	Pushcart Prize	Special mention	
2019	“Perfect Hands”	Robert and Adele Schiff Award in Prose, The Cincinnati Review	Won	
2021	Just an Ordinary Woman Breathing	Judy Grahn Award for Lesbian Nonfiction	Nominated	
2024	Otherwise	Lambda Literary Award for Nonfiction	Pending	

== Books ==
=== Creative nonfiction ===
- Wishbone: A Memoir in Fractures (Colgate University Press, 2010; Bywater Books, 2014)
- Small Fires: Essays (Sarabande Books, 2011)
- Tremolo: An Essay (Bloom Press, 2013)
- Catechism: A Love Story (Noctuary Press, 2016)
- The Unrhymables: Collaborations in Prose, with Denise Duhamel (Noctuary Press, 2019)
- Just an Ordinary Woman Breathing (The Ohio State University, 2020)
- Telephone: Essays in Two Voices, with Brenda Miller (Cleveland State University Poetry Center, 2021)

=== Hybrid forms ===
- P*R*I*D*E (Vermont College of Fine Arts/May Day Mountain Studios, 2020)

=== Poetry ===
- Without: Poems (Finishing Line Press, 2010)
- Postage Due: Poems & Prose Poems (White Pine Press, 2013)
- When I Was Straight (A Midsummer Night's Press, 2014)
- SIX (Red Hen Press, 2016)
- Same-Sexy Marriage: Poems (A Midsummer Night's Press, 2018)
- Skirted: Poems (The Word Works, 2021)
