= My Autobiography of Carson McCullers =

2020 book by Jenn Shapland

- Author: Jenn Shapland
- Language: English
- Genre: Memoir, Biography
- Published: February 4, 2020
- Publisher: Tin House Books
- Publication place: United States
- Media type: Print (paperback, hardcover)
- ISBN: 9781947793286

My Autobiography of Carson McCullers is a memoir by Jenn Shapland, published April 2, 2020 by Tin House Books. In 2021, the book won the Judy Grahn Award for Lesbian Nonfiction, the Lambda Literary Award for Lesbian Memoir, and the Phi Beta Kappa Christian Gauss Award. Along with being longlisted for the Andrew Carnegie Medal for Excellence in Nonfiction, it was a finalist for the National Book Award for Nonfiction and a Stonewall Book Award Honor Book.

== Reception ==
=== Reviews ===
Prior to publication, My Autobiography of Carson McCullers was named one of the most anticipated queer books of the Year by Lit Hub, BuzzFeed, Forbes, Electric Literature, and Oprah Magazine.

Following publication, the book received positive reviews from Booklist, Kirkus Reviews, The New York Times Book Review, The A.V. Club, Los Angeles Review of Books, The Times, Full Stop, The New York Review of Books, The Georgia Review, Star Tribune, The Rumpus, Lambda Literary, Autostraddle, Library Journal, The New Yorker, and Open Letters Review.

In various reviews, the book was called "revelatory", "stimulating", "gorgeous, brilliant", and "a moving record of love at the margins". The New York Review of Books referred to it as "part fan letter, part detective story, and part steely corrective".

The Los Angeles Times and The New Republic offered mixed reviews.

The Guardian's Rachel Cook provided a poor review, saying, "My Autobiography of Carson McCullers, as its too-clever-by-half-sounding title implies, is neither memoir nor biography... such a declaration cannot disguise the fact that her (over) identification with McCullers takes us nowhere that is very productive." In a similarly disappointed review, Publishers Weekly said, "Shapland’s intermingled autobiography and biography of McCullers’s life unsatisfyingly blurs what is real and what is imagined."

=== Awards ===
Year	Award	Result	Ref.
2020	National Book Award for Nonfiction	Finalist	
2021	Lambda Literary Award for Lesbian Memoir	Winner	
2021	Stonewall Book Award	Honor	
2021	Publishing Triangle Judy Grahn Award for Lesbian Nonfiction	Winner	
2021	Phi Beta Kappa Christian Gauss Award	Winner	
2021	Andrew Carnegie Medal for Excellence in Nonfiction	Longlist	
2021	Over the Rainbow Book List	Top 10	
2021	Reading the West Book Award	Honor	
2021	Southern Book Prize	Finalist	
