= Erastes (author) =

British author

Erastes is the pen name of a female author from the United Kingdom, known for writing gay-themed historical and romantic fiction.

Erastes initially began writing gay fiction after initially having started writing slash fiction set in the Harry Potter universe. She was also a director of the Erotic Authors Association (EAA), and the association flourished until 2010, when she handed the EAA over to new management. In 2010, Rolling Stone named Erastes one of the "premier authors" of male/male historical romances alongside Alex Beecroft, Laura Baumbach and Donald Hardy.

Her best-known works include Frost Fair, a bestselling novella published by Cheyenne Publishing in 2009, and Transgressions, a novel that was released in 2009 by Running Press in their M/M Historical Romance line and was a shortlisted nominee for a 2010 Lambda Literary Award in the gay romance category.

== Bibliography ==
=== Novels ===
- Standish. A homoerotic Regency romance (2006)
- Transgressions (2009)
- Mere Mortals (2011)

=== Novellas ===
- Hard & Fast, anthology: Speak Its Name, published by Cheyenne Publishing, 2009, ISBN 0-9797773-6-4 ISBN 978-0979777363
- Frost Fair, published by Cheyenne Publishing, 2009, ISBN 0-9797773-2-1 ISBN 978-0-9797773-2-5
- Tributary, anthology: The Last Gasp, published by Noble Romance Publishing, 2010, ISBN 978-1-60592-209-6
- Muffled Drum, published by Carina Press 2011, ASIN: B005078OKG

=== Short stories ===
- "Whatever the Risk", anthology: Queered Dimensions, Queered Fiction
- "The Blue Train", anthology: Riding the Rails (Bold Strokes Books)
- "Drug Colours", anthology: Best Gay Short Stories (Lethe Press)
- "Show Don't Tell", MEN Magazine, March 2008
- "Fire & Ice", anthology: J is for Jealousy (Cleis Press)
- "Lifeline", anthology: Cruise Lines (Alyson Books)
- "Drug Color", anthology: Where the Boys Are (Cleis Press)
- "Ribinks", Drabbler Magazine
- "The Bird", anthology: Fast Balls (Alyson Books)
- "Matelotage", anthology: Treasure Trail (Alyson Books)
- "Lucky", anthology: Love in a Lock Up (Starbooks)
- "In the Dark", anthology: Ultimate Gay Erotica 2007 (Alyson Books)
- "My Best Customer", anthology: Travelrotica (Alyson Books)
- "Ten Kisses", anthology Connections (Iris Print)
- "Bright Souls", anthology: Ultimate Gay Erotica 2005 (Alyson Books)
- "Sin of the Tongue", anthology: Blasphemy (Torquere Press)
- "I Will", anthology With This Ring I Thee Bed, (Spice, 2011)
