= Alex Beecroft =

English author

Alex Beecroft is an English author of historical and contemporary romantic fiction featuring gay characters. They also write science fiction/fantasy fiction as Alex Oliver, and cozy mysteries under the pseudonym Robyn Beecroft.

== Biography ==
Beecroft was born in Northern Ireland and grew up in the Peak District. As of 2010, they live near Cambridge and have two children.

Beecroft is agender and uses they/them pronouns.

== Writing career ==
Beecroft discovered slash fiction while searching for stories about Qui-Gon from Star Wars: The Phantom Menace. Inspired by what they read, Beecroft began writing their own slash stories based on The Silmarillion and the Pirates of the Caribbean franchise. Beecroft says that they had been "telling these kinds of stories in my head since I was 11. I started writing and thinking up stories with two gay protagonists. I thought I was a single, solitary pervert. When I discovered slash, I thought, 'Oh, my God, I'm normal!'"

Beecroft sees their stories as opportunities to play with and transcend traditional gender roles, stating "M/M romance can be used to examine relationships which don't suffer from the same sort of built in power imbalances and gender role constraints that make m/f romance such a minefield."

Beecroft won Linden Bay Romance's (now Samhain Publishing) Starlight Writing Competition in 2007 with their first novel, Captain's Surrender, making it their first published book. On the subject of writing gay romance, Beecroft has appeared in the Charleston City Paper, LA Weekly, the New Haven Advocate, the Baltimore City Paper, and The Other Paper. They are a regular reviewer for the blog Speak Its Name, which highlights historical gay fiction.

== Critical reception ==
In 2010, Rolling Stone named Beecroft one of the "premier authors" of male/male historical romances alongside Erastes, Laura Baumbach and Donald Hardy. In a profile that year in Out, Beecroft was called "one of the most popular and beloved authors in the rapidly expanding male/male romance genre, a defining feature of which is explicit gay male sex."

In a starred review of Beecroft's Blue-Eyed Stranger, Publishers Weekly called the novel "note perfect from start to finish" and that it featured "two highly credible, intelligent characters are portrayed with humor and pathos in a narrative awash in English historical references and local color." In 2018, Publishers Weekly named Beecroft 's Contraband Hearts as one of the year's best romance summer reads.

== Bibliography ==
=== Standalone Novels ===
- Captain’s Surrender (2008/2010)
- The Witch's Boy (2008/2011)
- False Colors (2009)
- Shining in the Sun (2011)
- Too Many Faerie Princes (2013)
- The Reluctant Berserker (2014)
- Foxglove Corpse (2017)
- Contraband Hearts (2018)

=== Series ===
==== Arising ====
- Sons of Devils (2017)
- Angels of Istanbul (2017)

==== Cygnus Five ====
- Lioness of Cygnus Five (2016)
- Heart of Cygnus Five (2017)
- Pride of Cygnus Five (2018)

==== Trowchester Blues ====
- Trowchester Blues (2015)
- Blue Eyed Stranger (2015)
- Blue Steel Chain (2015)
- Seeing Red (2019)

==== Under the Hill ====
- Bomber's Moon (2012)
- Dogfighters (2012)

==== The Unquiet Spirits ====
- Buried With Him (2016) prequel novella
- The Wages of Sin (2010)
- Waters of the Deep (2017)

=== Novellas ===
- Blessed Isle, anthology: Hidden Conflict: Tales from Lost Voices in Battle (2009)
- The Wages of Sin, anthology: The Mysterious (2010)
- By Honor Betrayed (2011)
- His Heart's Obsession (2012)
- The Crimson Outlaw (2013)
- Labyrinth (2016)

=== Short stories ===
- Insubordination (2008)
- Desire and Disguise, anthology: I Do (2009)
- Inner Truth, anthology: I Do Two (2010)
- All At Sea (a short story anthology) (2013)
