= Sandra Gail Lambert =

Essayist and fiction writer

- Born: c. 1953
- Occupation: Author
- Genre: Essays; Fiction; Memoir
- Notable awards: Lambda Literary Award for Lesbian Memoir or Biography (2025)

Sandra Gail Lambert (born c. 1953) is an American essayist and fiction writer. She is the author of The River's Memory (2014), A Certain Loneliness (2018), The Sacrifice Zone (2023), and My Withered Legs and Other Essays (2024). With American writer Sarah Einstein, she co-edited Older Queer Voices. A Certain Loneliness was a finalist for the 2019 Lambda Literary Award for Lesbian Memoir or Biography. In 2025, My Withered Legs and Other Essays won the same award and was a finalist for the Judy Grahn Award.

Lambert had polio in her early childhood, which resulted in lifelong physical disablement. She grew up as a military brat but spent most of her childhood in Norway. As of 2023, she lived in Gainesville, Florida with her wife.

== A Certain Loneliness (2018) ==
A Certain Loneliness: A Memoir was published by the University of Nebraska Press on September 1, 2018. In a series of 29 essays each varying between one and over ten pages, the memoir draws on Lambert's history of disability, stemming from polio-borne limitations beginning in her early childhood. Lambert shares how she required surgeries and body casts before age four, then spent much of her childhood in Norway in isolation as she wore braces to correct her bones. After returning to the United States during puberty, she realized she was attracted to women attempted to fit in with her peers, though this was impossible. As an adult, she experienced gawking and unwanted comments from strangers. After spending years warping her bones and attempts to use crutches, Lambert began using a wheelchair in her mid-thirties.

A Certain Loneliness was well received by critics. Kirkus Reviews described the book as "a powerful testimony to the determination and strength necessary to persevere despite assumptions, scrutiny, and societal stigmatization". Nell Beram, writing for Shelf Awareness, described A Certain Loneliness as a travelogue, with Lambert serving as "a sobering guide". While Beram found it easy to worry alongside Lambert, they noted that Lambert "won't become a captive in her wheelchair-friendly Florida home any time soon", while quoting a line from the book regarding a kayaking trip: "'Tomorrow... I'll hurt from this. Today, however, I know who I am.'"

Speaking to the book's writing and organization, Donna Talarico, writing for Hippocampus, found the "prose and structure" to be "incredible", describing the prose as having "a physicality to it". Though the essays are not listed in chronological order, Talarico found them well organized thematically. Kirkus Reviews also discussed the book's style, discussing how the stories provided are "unhurriedly told and expressed with true introspection; the author knows herself well and shares thoughts, feelings, and impressions with grace and acute self-awareness".

A Certain Loneliness was a finalist for the 2019 Lambda Literary Award for Lesbian Memoir or Biography.

== Awards and honors ==
In 2018, Lambert received a fellowship from the National Endowment for the Arts.

Awards for Lambert's work
Year	Title	Award	Result	Ref.
2019	A Certain Loneliness	Krause Essay Prize		
2019	A Certain Loneliness	Lambda Literary Award for Lesbian Memoir or Biography	Finalist	
2025	My Withered Legs and Other Essays	Judy Grahn Award	Finalist	
2025	My Withered Legs and Other Essays	Lambda Literary Award for Lesbian Memoir or Biography	Winner	

== Publications ==
- Lambert, Sandra Gail (2014). The River's Memory. Twisted Road Publications. ISBN 978-1-940-18900-0.
- Lambert, Sandra Gail (2018). Wolff, Tobias (ed.). A Certain Loneliness: A Memoir. American Lives. University of Nebraska Press. ISBN 978-1-496-20719-7.
- Lambert, Sandra Gail (2023). The Sacrifice Zone. Swamp Blossom Books. ISBN 979-8-987-92021-3.
- Lambert, Sandra Gail (2024). My Withered Legs and Other Essays. University of Georgia Press. ISBN 978-0-820-36590-9.
