= The Cincinnati Review =

- Discipline: literary journal
- Language: English
- Edited by: Lily Davenport

Publication details
- History: 2003-present
- Publisher: University of Cincinnati (United States)
- Frequency: Biannually

Standard abbreviations
- ISO 4: Cincinnati Rev.

Indexing
- ISSN: 1546-9034

Links
- Journal homepage

The Cincinnati Review is a literary magazine based in Cincinnati, Ohio, US, published by the University of Cincinnati. It was founded in 2003 and features poetry, fiction, and creative non-fiction. It has been listed as one of the top 50 literary magazines by Every Writer's Resource and has published Pulitzer Prize winners and Guggenheim and MacArthur fellows. Works from The Cincinnati Review have been selected to appear in the annual anthologies Best American Poetry, Best American Essays, New Stories from the South, Best American Short Stories, Best American Fantasy, Best American Mystery Stories, New Stories from the Midwest, and Best Creative Non-fiction.

== Masthead ==
- Managing editor: Lily Davenport
- Web and media editor: Bess Winter Kosinec
- Senior associate editor: Matt O'Keefe
- Poetry editor: Rebecca Lindenberg
- Fiction editor: Michael Griffith
- Literary nonfiction editor: Kristen Iversen

== Robert and Adele Schiff Awards ==
Since 2009, the magazine has honored writers annually for outstanding achievement in poetry and prose (since 2020, the prose category has been expanded to include fiction and nonfiction). The winners each receive $1,000 and are published in the magazine's prize issue.

- Previous winners:
- 2010–Prose: Theodore Wheeler ("The Current State of the Universe"); Poetry: Ashley Seitz Kramer ("Winter Storyboard")
- 2011–Prose: Elizabeth Cohen ("Mollusks and Optics"); Poetry: Tresha Faye Haefner ("A Walk Through the Parking Lot at Midnight")
- 2012–Prose: Carey Cameron ("Thursday"); Poetry: Emily Hipchen ("Boy into Polished Concrete")
- 2013–Prose: Karrie Higgins ("The Bottle City of God"); Poetry: Martha Silano ("The World")
- 2014–Prose: Tom Howard ("The Magnificents"); Poetry: Chelsea Jennings ("Elegy")
- 2015–Prose: Robert Long Foreman ("Awe"); Poetry: Jaime Brunton ("Chase")
- 2016–Prose: Maureen McGranaghan ("Stylites Anonymous"); Poetry: Aaron Coleman ("Very Many Hands")
- 2017–Prose: Sean Gill ("For Want of a Better Word"); Poetry: Samantha Grenrock ("This Was My Bulwark")
- 2018–Prose: Tori Malcangio ("See What I Mean"); Poetry: Maggie Millner ("Cherry Valley")
- 2019–Prose: Julie Marie Wade ("Perfect Hands"); Poetry: Bernard Ferguson ("you’re welcome")
- 2020–Fiction: Patch Kirschenbaum ("For Future Reference: Notes on the 7-10 Split"); Nonfiction: Anya Groner ("Upon Impact"); Poetry: Samyak Shertok ("No Man’s Land Ghazal")
- 2021–Fiction: Faire Holliday ("Standing Still"); Nonfiction: Barbara Paulus ("Beaches"); Poetry: Emma Miao ("Fifty years after the war")
- 2022–Fiction: Thomas Dodson ("The Watchman"); Nonfiction: L.I. Henley ("On the Subject of Bearing and 'Other Options'"); Poetry: Caroline Harper New ("Notes on Devotion")

== See also ==
- List of literary magazines
