= Casey Charles =

American lawyer, activist, academic, and author

- Occupations: Lawyer, activist, academic, and author

Academic background
- Education: University of California, Santa Cruz; San Francisco State University; Hastings College of Law; State University of New York at Buffalo
- Website: caseycharles.com

Casey Charles is an American lawyer, activist, academic, and author. He is a professor emeritus in the English Department at the University of Montana.

Charles is most known for articulating queer nuances in literature and work on HIV awareness through his essays, memoir, and poetry. He has authored eight books, including two poetry chapbooks, two novels—The Trials of Christopher Mann and The Monkey Cages—as well as a collection of essays on film and literature, a nonfiction book, and a memoir. His work has primarily focused on LGBTQ rights and representation.

== Education ==
Charles completed his B.A. in English Literature at the University of California, Santa Cruz, followed by an M.A. in English Literature from San Francisco State University. He obtained his Juris Doctor degree from Hastings College of Law and earned his Ph.D. in English Literature from the State University of New York at Buffalo in 1992.

== Career ==
Charles chaired the Department of English at the University of Montana from 2006 to 2009, where he taught gay and lesbian studies course at the University of Montana and became a founding member of the Western Montana Gay and Lesbian Community Center. He has also been a professor emeritus in the Department of English at the University of Montana since 2019. He edited the 6th edition of Cedilla.

== Research ==
Charles's research interests span the fields of law, literature, and human rights with a special emphasis on LGBTQ representation.

=== Critical queer nuances in literature and law ===
While investigating the emergence of queer nuances in early modern theater, Charles highlighted the presence of homoerotic connotations in Renaissance literature. On the subject of same-sex attraction in Shakespeare's Twelfth Night, he proposed not to adopt contemporary ideas of sexual identities, but to understand the dynamic of the play as dramatizing the fluidity of sexual attraction and gender norms. Later, in his assessment of sexual implications in Shakespeare's "Sonnet 20", he discussed how the text is subject to both an openly homoerotic presentist interpretation and at the same time a more historicist approach.

In The Sharon Kowalski Case: Lesbian and Gay Rights on Trial, Charles presented a history of one of the earliest legal struggles for same-sex domestic custody rights. Christopher Capozzola described this book as a "rich and gripping account of this courtroom drama". However, he also noted that Charles relied "a little too much, and a little too uncritically" on Karen Thompson's 1988 memoir as a source. His 2016 publication, Critical Queer Studies: Law, Film, and Fiction in Contemporary American Culture, examined the fields of contemporary queer studies in the context of literature, law, and film. In his review, Stephen Craig Kerry stated that the book's essays present 'critical queer study' of real/fictional characters and the legal-filmic discursive fields which frame them in a way that "transports these characters from their time to ours". He also highlighted the undrepresentation of certain genderqueer experiences, stating "Although the law and, in some cases, film can conceptualise the issue of transgenderism, they fail to 'get' genderqueerness". Sharif Mowlabocus from the University of Sussex documented that the book offered a "valuable and genuinely useful contribution to the fields of film studies, critical legal studies, and queer and gender studies". However, he criticized the challenging nature of the book's writing, stating "Indeed my only reservation in using this book – as a whole – for teaching is its somewhat dense style of prose and, in particular, its unwillingness to grant those without a legal background much space".

=== HIV long-term survival ===
Charles's literary works are also focused on raising awareness about HIV/AIDS and exploring the feelings of anger, fear, and resistance that are felt by individuals living with the virus. Through his poems, including the collections Blood Work and Zicatela, he stressed the need to show support and compassion to those affected by HIV/AIDS.

In the anthology HIV, Sex and Sexuality in Later Life, which he co-edited, Charles's two ethno-essays recount the resilience of HIV communities in Nairobi, Kenya, and Mumbai, India. Andrew Spieldenner noted that the book incorporates "thick descriptions," "keen analysis," and "accessible and rigorous" chapters that "poignantly explore their respective topics". However, he also described the book's categories as "blunt and arbitrary". His publication, Undetectable, provided an account of long-term HIV survival, focusing on viral loads, love, and loss.

=== Fiction ===
Charles's first novel, The Trials of Christopher Mann, told the story of a law student wrestling with his sexual orientation against the historical backdrop of the trial of Dan White for the murder of Harvey Milk in 1979. The Kirkus Reviews stated that this novel "dramatically addresses an important era" and had an "impressive exploration of Mann's internal struggle with his orientation". The Monkey Cages, published in 2018, also engages law and sexuality by setting its love story between a coach and a student in the historical context of the notorious homosexual scandal in Boise, Idaho, in 1955. Keith John Glaeske characterized the novel as "beautifully written" and "a gripping story with a sympathetic, attractive protagonist".

== Awards and honors ==
- 2004 – The Judy Grahn Award for Lesbian Nonfiction, Publishing Triangle
- 2007 – Best Books of the Year (Controlled Burn), Missoula Independent
- 2010 – Poetry Award, Washington Square

== Bibliography ==
=== Books ===
- Charles, Casey (2003). The Sharon Kowalski Case: Lesbian and Gay Rights on Trial. University Press of Kansas. ISBN 9780700612666.
- Charles, Casey (2007). Controlled Burn. Pudding House Publications. ISBN 9781589985056.
- Charles, Casey (2013). Blood Work. FLP Media Group. ISBN 9781622293131.
- Charles, Casey (2013). The Trials of Christopher Mann. Regal Crest Enterprises. ISBN 9781619290860.
- Charles, Casey (2016). Critical Queer Studies: Law, Film, and Fiction in Contemporary American Culture. Taylor & Francis. ISBN 9781317157090.
- Charles, Casey (2018). The Monkey Cages. Lethe Press. ISBN 9781590216491.
- Charles, Casey; Craig, Czury (2018). Zicatela. FootHills Publishing. ISBN 9780931053344.
- Charles, Casey; Kwok, Kan Diana; Henrickson, Mark; Ganesh, Shiv; Giwa, Sulaimon; Semigina, Tetyana (2024). HIV, Sex and Sexuality in Later Life. Policy Press. ISBN 9781447361961.
- Charles, Casey (2024). Undetectable. Running Wild Press. ISBN 9781955062985.
- Charles, Casey (2025). It Happened in a Garden. Christian Faith Publishing, Incorporated. ISBN 9798894282824.

=== Selected articles ===
- Charles, C. (1992). "Heroes as Lovers: Erotic Attraction Between Men in Sidney's New Arcadia". Criticism. 34 (4): 467–496.
- Charles, C. (1997). "Gender Trouble in Twelfth Night". Theatre Journal. 49 (2): 121–141. doi:10.1353/TJ.1997.0037.
- Charles, C. (1998). "Was Shakespeare Gay? Sonnet 20 and the Politics of Pedagogy". College Literature. 25 (3): 35–51.
- Charles, C. (2005). "Queer Writes". Women's Studies in Communication. 28 (1): 32–56. doi:10.1080/07491409.2005.10162483.
- Charles, C. (2006). "Panic in The Project". Law & Literature. 18 (2): 225–252. doi:10.1525/lal.2006.18.2.225.
