= The Heart Is a Lonely Hunter =

1940 novel by Carson McCullers

- First edition
- Author: Carson McCullers
- Language: English
- Genre: Southern Gothic
- Publisher: Houghton Mifflin
- Publication date: 1940
- Publication place: United States
- Media type: Print (hardcover)
- Pages: 356 pp

The Heart Is a Lonely Hunter (1940) is the debut novel of American author Carson McCullers, who was 23 at the time of publication. It is a Southern Gothic novel about a mute man named John Singer and the people he encounters in a 1930s mill town in the U.S. state of Georgia.

The novel was received positively both as a realist commentary on social conflict and as a parable about fascism.

== Title ==
The title appears to originate from the poem "The Lonely Hunter", written by the Scottish poet William Sharp under the pseudonym Fiona MacLeod, which uses the refrain "But my heart is a lonely hunter that hunts on a lonely hill."

== Plot ==
The book begins with a focus on the relationship between friends John Singer and Spiros Antonapoulos, who are both deaf and mute and have lived together for several years. Due to Antonapoulos' increasingly frequent alcohol-induced misbehavior, he is put into an insane asylum far away from town, despite Singer's attempts at intervention. Now alone, Singer moves into a new room in the Kellys' house.

Many people in the town are attracted to Singer's presence. The remainder of the narrative centers on the struggles of four of Singer's acquaintances, all of whom frequently visit him: Mick Kelly, a tomboy who loves music and dreams of buying a piano; Jake Blount, an alcoholic labor agitator; Biff Brannon, the observant owner of a diner; and Dr. Benedict Mady Copeland, an idealistic physician. Despite his lack of verbal response, each of these people believes Singer has a unique understanding of their struggles.

Singer misses Antonapoulos and makes visits to him in the asylum, but Antonapoulos seems unresponsive to Singer's attempts at communication.

== Characters ==
John Singer

Singer is a deaf engraver who has learned to speak. However, after he meets fellow mute Spiros Antonapoulos, Singer chooses to use only sign language. Many characters in the novel are attracted to Singer’s silent presence and project their struggles onto him, believing Singer originates from or is sympathetic towards their respective demographic groups. For example, Dr. Copeland believes Singer is Jewish, and Blount believes Singer "knows" the Communist political message that Blount is trying to share. However, Singer never confirms or denies these potential aspects of his identity. Initially, McCullers conceived of Singer as a Jewish character named Harry Minowitz, based on a painting of a Jewish man in an art gallery whose expression she found to be "wise, kindly, and compassionate".

Spiros Antonapoulos

Antonapoulos is a Greek manufacturer of sweets. Upon finding out he is also mute, Singer bonds with him, and they live together for several years. However, Antonapoulous appears to have intellectual disabilities and is largely motivated by food and alcohol, which often leads him to behave inappropriately in public. After a string of incidents, Antonapoulos's cousin – who has taken the American name Charles Parker – sends Antonapoulos to an insane asylum. Within the asylum, Antonapoulous's health deteriorates. Singer, who seems to entirely overlook Antonapoulos's negative traits, thinks of his friend frequently throughout the novel and wishes they could be reunited.

Margaret "Mick" Kelly

Mick, whom McCullers initially conceived as a male character named Jester, is a twelve-year-old girl who dresses in boys' clothes. Her family rents rooms in their house to lodgers but nevertheless sinks further into poverty throughout the novel. Mick loves music, going out of her way to listen to it on various radios, and dreams of owning a piano. She develops an increasingly feminine presentation once she begins vocational school, but continues to idolize Singer. Mick eventually leaves school to work at Woolworth's in order to support her family, but feels tricked as she finds herself exhausted after work each day, with no time to think of music.

Biff Brannon

Brannon owns the New York Cafe, a diner which he keeps open all night. He becomes fascinated by Singer after Singer begins to frequent the diner. Brannon is sympathetic towards Jake Blount despite Blount's owing him money. He is also fond of Mick, and allows her to eat and drink at reduced rates. He is the only character who seems aware that Singer is unlikely to share the various contradictory traits the others project onto him. Some critics believed Brannon's feminine traits and maternal quality, plus his impotence and loveless marriage with his wife before her death, implied him to be homosexual.

Dr. Benedict Mady Copeland

Dr. Copeland is a Black physician. Unlike his estranged family, he is not religious and believes that radical social and political change is needed to improve living conditions for African-Americans. Despite his family and friends facing poor work conditions and frequent oppression, he struggles to make people listen to his Marxist speeches. Dr Copeland suffers from a deep-rooted rage at this injustice. After his son Willie is mistreated in prison by racist guards, Copeland tries to make a legal appeal, but suffers a beating from courthouse guards. He has tuberculosis, which his stressful job exacerbates. Eventually, he moves back to his family's poor farm, which he views as a failure.

Jake Blount

Like Dr. Copeland, Blount is a Marxist. Singer is the only character in whom Blount confides, as Blount believes Singer also "knows". However, Blount's despair at the social conditions of the American South often drives him into a violent rage, further fueled by his alcoholism. Blount also fails to convince people to take up his ideas, despite distributing pamphlets and searching for people who might join him in a revolt. He speaks with Dr. Copeland after meeting him through Singer, but the two fail to agree or even recognize that they have similar goals. After Singer's death, Blount leaves town, still believing he can succeed in his plans for revolution.

== Reception ==
When published in 1940, the novel created a literary sensation and enjoyed a rapid rise to the top of the bestseller lists; it was the first in a string of works by McCullers that give voice to those who are rejected, forgotten, mistreated or oppressed. Evans wrote that the initial reaction was "a divided reception from the critics, some of whom were inclined to view it, not so much as a novel in its own right, but as a kind of literary phenomenon—as the precocious product" of a young author who may turn out higher quality product when she is older.

A. S. Knowles Jr argued that it "seems to capture Carson McCullers' total sensibility more completely than her other works."

Alice Hamilton wrote in the Dalhousie Review that the presence of so many mutes in the storyline "Taken literally [...] strains the bounds of credulity."

Frederic I. Carpenter wrote in The English Journal that the ending exhibits "frustration" as Biff Brannon makes comments and as Adolf Hitler makes proclamations over the radio.

The Modern Library ranked the novel seventeenth on its list of the 100 best English-language novels of the 20th century. Time included it in "TIME 100 Best English-language Novels from 1923 to 2005". In 2004 the novel was selected for Oprah's Book Club.

== Adaptations ==
A film adaptation was made in 1968, starring Alan Arkin, Sondra Locke and Cicely Tyson.

A stage adaptation of The Heart Is a Lonely Hunter premiered on March 30, 2005, at the Alliance Theatre in Atlanta, Georgia. The show ran until April 24 of that year, then toured. The play was an Alliance Theater presentation done in association with The Acting Company out of New York. The play, adapted by Rebecca Gilman, was directed by Doug Hughes.

British artist Joe Simpson made McCullers's book the centerpiece of his 2014 painting, The Heart Is A Lonely Hunter. The painting shows two characters each reading the book on the London Underground; it is one of his ongoing series of paintings entitled, "London".

A radio dramatization was broadcast in two parts by BBC Radio 4 on 15 and 22 March 2020.
