= Clock Without Hands (novel) =

Novel by Carson McCullers

First edition

Clock Without Hands is American author Carson McCullers' final novel. It is a Southern Gothic novel set in Georgia. It depicts the theme of racial integration from the perspective of four main characters, who are dealing with their personal problems. It was published on September 18, 1961 by Houghton Mifflin.

== Plot ==
Set in small-town Georgia in 1953 on the eve of court-ordered racial integration, four men consider their lives:

- 39-year-old pharmacist J. T. Malone discovers that he has leukemia and has only months to live.
- Judge Clane, the town's leading citizen and former congressman, longs for the old ways of the Southern United States, but also mourns the loss of his wife and son, the latter who committed suicide.
- Sherman Pew is a talented black foundling (left on a pew) with blue eyes, who is employed by Judge Clane to be his amenuensis.
- Jester is Judge Clane's grandson and is learning to fly and studying law. Jester is strangely drawn to Sherman but is growing to despise his grandfather's beliefs.

== Reception ==
The book received primarily positive reviews. Kirkus Reviews stated that the novel "embellishes an already fine literary reputation though it lacks the sting of [McCullers'] previous work" while The Atlantic called the book "the masterly new novel by Carson McCullers."
