= Marcia Gallo =

American historian and author

- Born: c. 1951; Wilmington, Delaware, USA
- Awards: Judy Grahn Award (2016); Lambda Literary Award for Nonfiction (2016)

Academic background
- Education: Padua Academy; Holy Names University; City University of New York (2004)
- Thesis: Different daughters: The Daughters of Bilitis and the roots of lesbian and women's liberation, 1955–1970 (2004)
- Doctoral advisor: Martin Duberman

Academic work
- Institutions: University of Nevada, Las Vegas

Marcia M. Gallo (born c. 1951) is an American historian and author. She is professor emerita at the University of Nevada, Las Vegas. Her 2016 non-fiction book, No One Helped, won the Judy Grahn Award for Lesbian Nonfiction and Lambda Literary Award for LGBT Nonfiction.

== Early life and education ==
Gallo was born c. 1951, in Wilmington, Delaware, and has two younger brothers: Ed and Mike Maggitti. She attended St. Peter’s Cathedral School and Padua Academy, and graduated high school in 1969.

Gallo took courses at San Francisco State University and eventually earned a degree from Holy Names University. She earned her doctorate in history from the Graduate Center of the City University of New York (CUNY) in 2004.

== Career ==
Gallo began her career as a secretary working at DuPont. After marrying in 1973, she became a stay-at-home housewife for a short time before taking on a secretary position at Today, Inc.

After moving to San Francisco in 1978, Gallo became a secretary for the American Civil Liberties Union, later becoming the field organizer for the San Francisco office. While there, she learned about the Daughters of Bilitis, the first American lesbian civil rights group, which later inspired her doctoral dissertation.

In 2006, Gallo taught at Bronx Lehman College in coordination with CUNY. The same year, she published her doctoral dissertation as her first book, Different Daughters: A History of the Daughters of Bilitis and the Birth of the Lesbian Rights Movement, with Carroll & Graf Publishers in 2006. The following year, the book was a finalist for the Judy Grahn Award for Lesbian Nonfiction and Lambda Literary Award for LGBT Nonfiction.

Gallo joined the faculty at the University of Nevada, Las Vegas, in 2008.

She published her second book, "No One Helped": Kitty Genovese, New York City, and the Myth of Urban Apathy, with Cornell University Press in 2015. The following year, the book won the Judy Grahn Award for Lesbian Nonfiction and Lambda Literary Award for LGBT Nonfiction.

From 2015 to 2017, Gallo was the president of the Southwest Oral History Association. From 2017 to 2018, she was the Martin Duberman Visiting Scholar with the New York Public Library.

As of 2024, Gallo is professor emerita at the University of Nevada, Las Vegas.

== Personal life ==
Gallo married her husband Victor in 1973 after having been in a relationship for over three years, during which time he had fought in the Vietnam War. The couple lived in Levittown, Pennsylvania. They divorced c. 1977, after which Gallo moved to California, where she began to explore her sexuality.

In 1978, Gallo moved with her girlfriend to San Francisco. The couple broke up in the mid-1990s, after which Gallo moved to New York City.

As of 2008, Gallo lived with her long-term partner, Dr. Ann Cammett, in Las Vegas.

== Awards and honors ==
Awards for Gallo's writing
Year	Title	Awards	Result	Ref.
2007	Different Daughters	Judy Grahn Award for Lesbian Nonfiction	Finalist	
2007	Different Daughters	Lambda Literary Award for LGBT Nonfiction	Finalist	
2016	No One Helped	Judy Grahn Award for Lesbian Nonfiction	Won	
2016	No One Helped	Lambda Literary Award for LGBT Nonfiction	Won	

== Publications ==
- Different Daughters: A History of the Daughters of Bilitis and the Birth of the Lesbian Rights Movement. Carroll & Graf Publishers. 2006. ISBN 978-0-78671-634-0.
- "No One Helped": Kitty Genovese, New York City, and the Myth of Urban Apathy. Cornell University Press. 2015. ISBN 9780801452789.
