= Catherine Friend =

American writer

Catherine Friend (born March 15, 1957) is an American writer of adult nonfiction, fiction, and children's books. Her works have won her four Goldie Awards from the Golden Crown Literary Society, the Minnesota Book Award for General Nonfiction, and Keystone to Reading Book Award for Primary. She was also a finalist for three Lambda Literary Awards and a Judy Grahn Award.

Friend received Bachelor of Arts in economics and Spanish, as well as a Master of Science in economics.

For 25 years, Friend and her wife, Melissa, lived on Rising Moon Farm, a small farm in southeastern Minnesota, where they raised sheep and used their wool for yarn. The farm was 53 acres and housed sheep, llamas, goats, steers, ducks, chickens, and peacocks.

== Awards ==
Year	Title	Award	Result	Ref.
2007	Hit by a Farm	Goldie Award for Lesbian Short Story/Essay Collections	Winner	
2007	Hit by a Farm	Judy Grahn Award for Lesbian Nonfiction	Finalist	
2007	Hit by a Farm	Lambda Literary Award for Lesbian Memoir or Biography	Finalist	
2008	A Pirate's Heart	Lambda Literary Award for Lesbian Romance	Finalist	
2008	The Crown of Valencia	Goldie Award for Lesbian Speculative Fiction	Winner	
2008	The Spanish Pearl	Goldie Award for Dramatic General Fiction	Winner	
2009	Compassionate Carnivore	Minnesota Book Award for General Nonfiction	Winner	
2009	The Perfect Nest	Keystone to Reading Book Award for Primary	Winner	
2009	A Pirate's Heart	Golldie Award for Historical Romance	Winner	
2012	Sheepish	Lambda Literary Award for Lesbian Memoir or Biography	Finalist	

== Publications ==
=== Books for adults ===
==== Fiction ====
- A Pirate's Heart (2008)
- The Copper Egg (2016)
- Spark (2017)

===== Kate Vincent Adventures =====
- The Spanish Pearl (2007)
- The Crown of Valencia (2007)

==== Nonfiction ====
- Hit by a Farm: How I Learned to Stop Worrying and Love the Barn (2006)
- Sheepish: Two Women, Fifty Sheep, and Enough Wool to Save the Planet (2011)
- Compassionate Carnivore: Or, How to Keep Animals Happy, Save Old Macdonald's Farm, Reduce Your Hoofprint, and Still Eat Meat (2008)

=== Books for young people ===
- My Head Is Full of Colors (1994)
- The Sawfin Stickleback: A Very Fishy Story, illustrated by Dan Yaccarino (1994)
- Funny Ruby (2000)
- Silly Ruby (2000)
- Well Done Worm! with Kathy Caple (2000)
- The Perfect Nest, illustrated by John Manders (2007)
- Barn Boot Blues (2011)
- The Broken Elevator, illustrated by Craig Orback (2013)

==== Eddie the Raccoon series ====
- Eddie the Raccoon (2004)
- Eddie and Little Skunk (2004)
- Eddie Digs a Hole (2004)
- Eddie In A Jam (2004)
- No Eggs for Eddie (2004)
