= Amy Hoffman =

American writer and editor

- Born: 1952 (age 73–74)
- Education: Brandeis University
- Occupations: Writer; editor
- Writing career
- Genres: Literary fiction; non-fiction
- Notable work: An Army of Ex-Lovers
- Website: amyhoffman.net

Amy Hoffman (born 1952) is an American writer, editor, and community activist.

== Early life ==
Hoffman was born to a traditional Jewish family. She is the eldest of six children, and grew up in Rutherford, New Jersey.

Hoffman graduated from Brandeis University in 1976. She received her Masters of Fine Arts from the University of Massachusetts Amherst.

== Career ==
Hoffman worked as an editor for Boston's Gay Community News from 1978 to 1982. As features editor, she was responsible for putting together the June 1979 Stonewall tenth anniversary issue. She also served a development director for Massachusetts Foundations for the Humanities and the Women's Lunch Place.

During the mid-1980s, Hoffman worked with Cindy Patton to publish a sex-positive magazine for several years. Named Bad Attitude, it was part of what became known as the lesbian sex wars. Lesbian pornography had previously been created with the pleasure of straight men in mind. Patton and Hoffman sought to create a magazine that would celebrate the erotic potential of women with women in a way that affirmed lesbian sexuality, and de-centered straight men's pleasure.

Hoffman published her first book, Hospital Time, in 1997, with a foreword by Urvashi Vaid. The book recollects her friendship with Mike Riegle in the wake of his death from AIDS.

In 2007, Hoffman wrote the memoir An Army of Ex-Lovers about her time as an editor for Gay Community News. The memoir was met with positive reviews in LGBT and mainstream media, and was a finalist for the Publishing Triangle Judy Grahn Award and a Lambda Book Award in 2008.

Hoffman was editor-in-chief of Women's Review of Books from 2003 to 2004 and from 2006 to 2018. Women's Review of Books had shut down between these periods due to lack of financing; Hoffman was the party most responsible for reviving the magazine.

Hoffman is faculty-at-large at Lasell University's Creative Nonfiction MFA program.

Hoffman is the editor, along with Jyotsna Vaid, of the forthcoming book The Dream of a Common Movement: Selected Writings of Urvashi Vaid. Vaid, who died in 2022, was a LGBTQ+ activist, author, and civil rights lawyer. The book of writings and speeches will be published by Duke University Press, available on April 15, 2025.

== Personal life ==
Amy Hoffman is married to Roberta Stone.

== Publications ==
=== Memoirs ===
- Hoffman, Amy (1997). Hospital Time. Duke University Press. ISBN 9780822383031.
- Hoffman, Amy (2007). An Army of Ex-Lovers: My life at the Gay Community News. University of Massachusetts Press. ISBN 9781558496217.
- Hoffman, Amy (2013). Lies About My Family. University of Massachusetts Press. ISBN 9781625340030.

=== Novels ===
- Hoffman, Amy (2019). The Off Season. University of Wisconsin Press. ISBN 9780299314606.
- Hoffman, Amy (2022). Dot & Ralfie. University of Wisconsin Press. ISBN 9780299333645.

=== Panels ===
- Moderated Gay Community News at 50: Content, Controversy, & Coverage panel at Massachusetts Historical Society in partnership with The History Project.
