= Beyond (Straight and Gay) Marriage =

2008 book by Nancy Polikoff

Beyond (Straight and Gay) Marriage: Valuing All Families under the Law
- Cover of the first edition
- Author: Nancy D. Polikoff
- Language: English
- Series: Queer Action/Queer Ideas
- Subject: Family law
- Publisher: Beacon Press
- Publication date: 2008
- Publication place: United States
- Media type: Print
- ISBN: 978-0807044322
- LC Class: KF538 .P65

Beyond (Straight and Gay) Marriage: Valuing All Families under the Law is a 2008 book about family law reform by the legal scholar Nancy D. Polikoff.

== Publication history ==
Beyond (Straight and Gay) Marriage was first published in 2008 by Beacon Press. It was the third entry in the Queer Action/Queer Ideas series, edited by the gay writer Michael Bronski.

== Reception ==
Beyond (Straight and Gay) Marriage received positive reviews from Jay Barth in Choice, Kenyon Farrow in The Indypendent, and Robert L. Mack in the Journal of GLBT Family Studies. Barth praised the book as "thoroughly researched, nicely argued, and well written". He found Polikoff's critique of the mainstream LGBT rights movement's approach to marriage "thought provoking", and recommended the book as suitable for upper-division undergraduates. Farrow credited Polikoff with arguing convincingly "that we have had more progressive moves toward family policy in our country's history". He remarked that Polikoff had provided real-life examples of problems occasioned by tying legal benefits to marriage, and recommended the book to readers "to help you ground your argument in practical terms". Mack described Beyond (Straight and Gay) Marriage as the first "well-researched, thoughtful, and articulate volume-length work" on decoupling legal rights from the institution of marriage in order to accommodate other family structures.

== Sources ==
- Barth, Jay (October 2008). "Reviews: Social and Behavioral Sciences". Choice. Vol. 46, no. 2. p. 393. ISSN 0009-4978.
- Dempsey, Brian (October 2010). "Book Reviews". SCOLAG Legal Journal (396): 230–231. ISSN 1749-7671.
- Farrow, Kenyon (26 June 2008). "Reading Gay Pride: New Books for the Queer Left". The Indypendent.
- Kahla, Keith (5 May 2008). "Yes and No". Publishers Weekly. Vol. 255, no. 18. ISSN 0000-0019.
- Labonté, Richard (14 February 2008). "Book Marks". Lavender.
- Mack, Robert L. (3 February 2010). "Media Reviews". Journal of GLBT Family Studies. 6 (1): 107–110. doi:10.1080/15504280903475884. ISSN 1550-428X. S2CID 143463996.
- Nair, Yasmin (23 April 2008). "Book Review". Windy City Times. ISSN 1049-698X.
- Norrie, Kenneth McK. (December 2008). "Chasing the chimera" (PDF). International Journal of Law in Context. 4 (4): 411–417. doi:10.1017/S1744552309004091. ISSN 1744-5523. S2CID 144986275.
- "Reviews". Publishers Weekly. Vol. 254, no. 43. 29 October 2007. p. 41. ISSN 0000-0019.
- Robson, Ruthann (2008). "Families of Affinity". The Women's Review of Books. 25 (4): 12–13. ISSN 0738-1433. JSTOR 20476741.
- Wax, Amy L. (2009). "The Family Law Doctrine of Equivalence". Michigan Law Review. 107 (6): 999–1017. ISSN 0026-2234. JSTOR 40379848.
