= James Davidson (historian) =

British scholar of Ancient Greece

Academic background
- Education: Oxford University, Columbia University

Academic work
- Discipline: Ancient History
- Sub-discipline: Greek Social History
- Institutions: Warwick University

James Davidson is a professor of ancient history at the University of Warwick. Davidson specialises in the social history of ancient Greece and has made significant contributions to the study of ancient homosexuality. He was educated at Columbia and Oxford University, where he received a DPhil. From 2001 to 2004 he was a member of the Council for the Society for the Promotion of Hellenic Studies, and from 2000 to 2010 a member of the Classical Association Journals Board. His book The Greeks and Greek Love: a Radical Reappraisal of Homosexuality in Ancient Greece was awarded the Mark Lynton History Prize in 2010.

== Selected publications ==
- Davidson, James N (1994), Consuming Passions: Appetite, Addiction and Spending in Classical Athens, OCLC 260219359
- Davidson, James N (1997), Courtesans [and] Fishcakes: The Consuming Passions of Classical Athens, Harper Collins, ISBN 978-0-00-255591-3
- Davidson, James N (2000), One Mykonos: Being Ancients, Being Islands, Being Giants, Being Gay, Thomas Dunne Books/St. Martin's Press, ISBN 978-0-312-26214-3
- Davidson, James N (2008), The Greeks and Greek Love: A Radical Reappraisal of Homosexuality in Ancient Greece, Phoenix paperback, Phoenix, ISBN 978-0-7538-2226-5

=== Articles ===
- Davidson, James, "At the British Museum", London Review of Books, vol. 45, no.3 (2 February 2023), pp. 26–27.
