= Armando Maggi =

American historian

Armando Maggi is an American historian of the Renaissance and author.

== Bibliography ==
- Satan's Rhetoric: A Study of Renaissance Demonology (2001)
- In the Company of Demons: Unnatural Beings, Love, and Identity in the Italian Renaissance (2007)
- Preserving the Magic Spell: Basile’s “The Tale of Tales” and Its Afterlife in the Fairy-Tale Tradition (2015)
