= Charles Jensen (poet) =

American poet and editor (born 1977)

Charles Jensen (born April 5, 1977) is an American poet and editor.

== Life ==
He received an MFA degree in creative writing from Arizona State University, where he served as a poetry editor for Hayden's Ferry Review. He received the inaugural Red Mountain Review Chapbook Prize, selected by Joel Brouwer, for his collection Little Burning Edens and the 2006 Frank O'Hara Chapbook Award for Living Things, an elegy sequence. He was a published finalist for the 2007 DIAGRAM/New Michigan Press Chapbook Award for his mixed genre story The Strange Case of Maribel Dixon.His first full-length book of poems, The First Risk, was published by Lethe Press in 2009. It was a finalist for the 2010 Lambda Literary Award. He received an artist's project grant from the Arizona Commission on the Arts. His other chapbooks are The Nanopedia Quick-Reference Pocket Lexicon of Contemporary American Culture (MiPOEASIAS Chapbook Series, 2012), Breakup/Breakdown (Five Oaks Press, 2016), and Story Problems, winner of the 2017 Palooka Press Chapbook Contest (Palooka Press, 2017).

His writing has appeared in American Poetry Review, Bloom, New England Review, The Journal, Colorado Review, Columbia Poetry Review, Field, Copper Nickel, Hayden's Ferry Review, Prairie Schooner, Puerto del Sol, and Willow Springs. With the poet Sarah Vap, he published interviews with several poets, including C. D. Wright, Lynn Emanuel, and Frank Paino.

In 2006, he founded LOCUSPOINT, an online literary journal dedicated to publishing creative work on a city-by-city basis, selected by a guest editor who lives in that city.

== Works ==
- "Joseph Smith's Prayer for the God Made Flesh," Whale Sound
- Selections from The Strange Case of Maribel Dixon published by spork
- Selections from NANOPEDIA: The Smallest American Reference published by The Collagist
- "Shopping," Blood Orange Review
- "Bargaining," Best of the Net 2007 (originally published in No Tell Motel)
- "Flowers," No Tell Motel
