= Southern Indiana Review =

American literary magazine

- Discipline: Literary journal
- Language: English
- Edited by: Ron Mitchell

Publication details
- History: 1994-present
- Publisher: University of Southern Indiana (United States)
- Frequency: Biannual

Standard abbreviations
- ISO 4: South. Indiana Rev.

Indexing
- ISSN: 1932-6866

Links
- Journal homepage

Southern Indiana Review is a literary magazine produced at the University of Southern Indiana since 1994. The journal is known for its Mary C. Mohr Awards in fiction, nonfiction and poetry. Work that has appeared in the journal has been honored in the Best American Short Stories and the Best American Essays.

Past contributors include Richard Newman, Liam Rector, Karen Uhlmann, Tony Hoagland, Jacob M. Appel, and Jennifer S. Davis.

== Masthead ==
As of December 2008, the journal's editors were:

- Founding editors: Matthew Graham, Tom Wilhelmus
- Managing editor: Ron Mitchell
- Art editor: Greg Blair
- Poetry editor: Rosalie Moffett
- Fiction editor: Casey Pycior
- Associate editor:
- Assistant editors: Patricia Aakhus, Leisa Belleau, Randy Pease

== See also ==
- List of literary magazines
