= Nancy Polikoff =

American lawyer

Nancy D. Polikoff
- Born: 1952 (age 73–74)
- Education: University of Pennsylvania, 1972 J.D., Georgetown University Law Center, 1975 Master of Arts in women's studies, George Washington University, 1980
- Known for: American law professor, LGBT rights activist, author
- Spouse: Cheryl Swannack

Nancy D. Polikoff (born 1952) is an American law professor, LGBT rights activist, and author. She is a professor emerita at Washington College of Law. Polikoff's work focuses on LGBTQ rights, family law, and gender identity issues. She authored Beyond (Straight and Gay) Marriage: Valuing All Families under the Law (2008).

== Education ==
Polikoff completed a Bachelor of Arts in English from the University of Pennsylvania in 1972. She earned a J.D. from Georgetown University Law Center in 1975. In 1976, Polikoff was a co-author of one of the first law review articles about the custody rights of lesbian mothers. In 1980, she completed a Master of Arts in women's studies from George Washington University.

== Career ==
From 1975 to 1976, Polikoff was an instructor at Catholic University Columbus School of Law. She was an attorney and founding partner at Hunter, Polikoff, Bodley & Bottum, P.C. Washington D.C. Feminist Law Collective from 1976 to 1981. Polikoff was a staff attorney for the Women's Legal Defense Fund from 1982 to 1987. She joined the faculty at Washington College of Law as an assistant professor in 1987. She helped coordinate the representation for protesters arrested at the United States Supreme Court Building in October 1987 for civil disobedience in protest of the Bowers v. Hardwick ruling. She worked as an associate professor from 1990 to 1993 before becoming a full professor. She was the James E. Rogers College of Law visiting professor at University of Arizona Law School from 2004 to 2005. She was the UCLA School of Law visiting McDonald/Wright Chair of Law and the faculty chair of the Williams Institute from the fall of 2011 to fall of 2012. Polikoff was a visiting professor at Georgetown University Law Center the spring of 2015.

Polikoff was the chair of the Association of American Law Schools section on sexual orientation and gender identity issues. She is a member of the National Family Law Advisory Council of the National Center for Lesbian Rights. As of February 2019, Polikoff is a professor emerita at American University Washington College of Law.

Her work focuses on LGBTQ issues and same-sex parenting law. She is a contributing blogger to the Bilerico Project and Beyond Straight and Gay Marriage.

== Awards ==
Polikoff was a finalist for the Lambda Literary Award Best LGBT Non-Fiction in 2009 for her book, Beyond (Straight and Gay) Marriage. She received the Gay and Lesbian Activists Alliance Distinguished Service Award in 2009. She received the National LGBT Bar Association Dan Bradley award in 2011.

== Personal life ==
Polikoff's father was lawyer Harry Polikoff. She is a lesbian and was married to filmmaker Cheryl Swannack until March 15, 2020, when Swannack died due to Parkinson's disease.

== Selected works ==
=== Books ===
- Polikoff, Nancy D. (2008). Beyond (Straight and Gay) Marriage: Valuing All Families under the Law. Beacon Press. ISBN 9780807044346.

=== Journal articles ===
- Hunter, Nan D.; Polikoff, Nancy D. (1975–1976). "Custody Rights of Lesbian Mothers: Legal Theory and Litigation Strategy". Buffalo Law Review. 25: 691.
- Polikoff, Nancy D. (1989–1990). "This Child Does Have Two Mothers: Redefining Parenthood to Meet the Needs of Children in Lesbian-Mother and Other Nontraditional Families". Georgetown Law Journal. 78: 459.
- Polikoff, Nancy D. (1993). "We Will Get What We Ask For: Why Legalizing Gay and Lesbian Marriage Will Not Dismantle the Legal Structure of Gender in Every Marriage". Virginia Law Review. 79 (7): 1535–1550. doi:10.2307/1073381. JSTOR 1073381.
- Polikoff, Nancy D. (2009). "A Mother Should Not Have to Adopt Her Own Child: Parentage Laws for Children of Lesbian Couples in the Twenty-First Century". Stanford Journal of Civil Rights & Civil Liberties. 5: 201.
