= Hijab Butch Blues =

2023 memoir by Lamya H.

- Author: Lamya H.
- Language: English
- Genre: Memoir
- Publisher: Dial Press
- Publication date: February 6, 2023
- Publication place: United States
- Pages: 336
- ISBN: 978-0-593-44878-6

Hijab Butch Blues is a 2023 memoir by pseudonymous author Lamya H, published by Dial Press. The memoir's title is a reference to Stone Butch Blues, Leslie Feinberg's 1993 novel.

== Background ==
Lamya H. was born in an Urdu-speaking country. At age four, she and her parents moved to a metropolitan city in a "rich Arab country". At age 14, she realized she was gay after connecting to the story of Maryam in Surah Maryam of the Qur'an. She moved to the U.S. at age 17 after receiving a scholarship to a "prestigious college" in New York City.

She began writing the essays that comprise the memoir in her 20s.

Lamya describes herself as gender non-conforming, queer, and non-binary. She uses she/they pronouns.

== Summary ==
The memoir is split into three parts. Throughout the book, Lamya connects her own experiences to stories and figures from the Qur'an.

The first part explores Lamya's childhood and early experiences with gender. In the second part, Lamya discusses and challenges the idea of the "authentically gay experience," dismissing the idea that a person needs to come out to one's parents or family to be considered "gay enough". She also discusses the activities she engages in as part of her LGBT identity, such as "dosas every Thursday evening; watching the soccer world cup and picking which teams to cheer on based on anti-imperialism..."

In the final part of the memoir, Lamya discusses her internalized homophobia, relationship to Islam, and decision to come out.

== Reception ==
Hijab Butch Blues received positive reviews from Autostraddle, Muslim Girl, NPR, The Skinny, Them, and Xtra Magazine.

The memoir won the Brooklyn Public Library's Nonfiction Prize for 2023. It was also a finalist for the 36th Lambda Literary Awards, in the category of Lesbian Memoir or Biography.
