= Fred Kaplan (biographer) =

Biographer (born 1937)

- Born: 1937 (age 88–89); The Bronx, New York, U.S.
- Education: Brooklyn College (B.A.); Columbia University (Ph.D.)
- Occupation: Biographer

Fred Kaplan (born 1937) is distinguished Professor Emeritus of English at Queens College and the Graduate Center of the City University of New York.

== Biography ==
He was born in 1937 in The Bronx, New York, and attended Lafayette High School and Brooklyn College.

He was stabbed in New York in 1996, but made a recovery.

== Books ==
He is the author of several biographies. His book Thomas Carlyle was a finalist for the National Book Critics Circle Award, and the Pulitzer Prize.

- His Masterly Pen: A Biography of Jefferson the Writer. HarperCollins. 2022. ISBN 9780062440037.
- John Quincy Adams: American Visionary, HarperCollins, 2014, ISBN 9780061915413
- Lincoln: The Biography of a Writer. HarperCollins. 2008. ISBN 9780060773342.
- The Singular Mark Twain: A Biography. Doubleday. 2003. ISBN 9780385477154.
- Gore Vidal: A Biography Doubleday, 1999, ISBN 9780385477031; Bloomsbury Publishing, 2012, ISBN 9781408840726
- Henry James: The Imagination of Genius, A Biography. Morrow. 1992. ISBN 9780688090210.; Taylor & Francis US, 1999, ISBN 9780801862717
- Dickens: A Biography, William Morrow & Company, 1988, ISBN 9780688043414
- Sacred tears: sentimentality in Victorian literature, Princeton University Press, 1987, ISBN 9780691067001
- Thomas Carlyle: A Biography, Cornell University Press, 1983, ISBN 9780801415081; University of California Press, 1993, ISBN 9780520082007
- Dickens and mesmerism: the hidden springs of fiction, Princeton University Press, 1975, ISBN 9780691062914
- John Elliotson on Mesmerism, Da Capo Press, (New York), 1982. ISBN 9780306761676
