= Homophile Community Health Service =

Non-profit Boston health program

The Homophile Community Health Service (HCHS) was a non-profit Boston-based program that offered low-cost psychiatric and counseling treatment to individuals of the LGBT community. It opened on January 4, 1971, and offered therapy services to thousands of clients within its first years of operation. The program was run mainly by volunteers and often encountered financial stress as they relied heavily of donations from community members.

== History ==
On January 4, 1971, the Homophile Community Health Service opened their doors at 112 Arlington Street. The HCHS was organized by Dr. Richard Pillard, the first openly gay psychiatrist in the United States, and Rev. Don McGaw. The opening was made possible by a $2,000 donation from the Morgan Memorial United Methodist Church of all nations. The HCHS was a non-profit organization with tax-exemption.

Throughout its existence HCHS moved to a larger location at 419 Boylston Street and opened a second location in Provincetown, Rhode Island. They also expanded to open the Other Voices Bookstore which featured LGBTQ literature and served as a meeting place for LGBTQ talks and speakers. The HCHS sponsored the Gay Way radio station, headed by John Lawrence, the Director of Education at HCHS produces the show along with Elain Nobe. Boston University partnered with HCHS to offer courses on homosexuality.

As a non-profit, HCHS had continual financial difficulties because of their reliance on donations. By 1976, the organization was $5,300 in debt. Their constant financial difficulties led them to disband in the 1980s. Services such as Fenway Health and the Gay and Lesbian Counseling Service remained as resources for the LGBTQ community in Boston.

== Operations ==
The services offered by the HCHS centered around care for individuals of the LGBT community. This included low cost therapy, educational programs, and social welfare programs. The HCHS recognized that people of the LGBT community face unique struggles and strive to provide treatment to help individuals overcome these obstacles when seeking treatment. They did not believe people of the LGBT community had an illness and functioned as a support system, not a cure for their sexuality.

The program is broken into two main sections: Clinical Services and the Education Department. Within the Clinical Services division, there was help for alcoholism, drug rehabilitation, an emergency hotline, family resources, and tradition therapy. One of the alcoholism programs was known as the Homophile Alcohol Treatment Services. This was partially funded by the Massachusetts Division of Alcoholism and focused on providing alcohol information to the LGBT community.

The Education Department had multiple components to it. These included running a radio show on WBUR, called the Gay Way. Additionally, the HCHS taught a class on "homosexuality" at Boston University for multiple semesters. This helped to educate individuals on LGBT issues and also was a means of funding the program.

The HCHS helped many people of the LGBT community. It is reported that within the first two months of opening, they saw 60 different clients. After five months, they had seen over 220 clients and answered 1,200 phone calls. By year three of operation, they had seen 2,000 clients. Their staff began with only five and grew dramatically over time. After only a year and half, there were 35 staff members.
