= The Greeks and Greek Love =

2007 book

- Author: James Davidson
- Language: English
- Published: 2007
- Publisher: Weidenfeld and Nicolson
- Publication place: United Kingdom
- ISBN: 0297819976

The Greeks and Greek Love: A Radical Reappraisal of Homosexuality in Ancient Greece is a book by James Davidson.

== Contents ==
The book investigates the linguistic aspect of love and sexuality in Ancient Greece. The book makes the analogy between ancient sexuality and the Gordian knot, which he intended to untie by intrincately examining it in order to "follow, so far as I could, where each strand le[ads]".

It also criticizes Kenneth Dover and Michel Foucault's view of Greek homosexuality that focuses more on sexual penetration than other aspects of same-sex attraction. Davidson described such view as "resembl[ing] a sado-masochistic sex club in 1970s San Francisco". A review of the book on The Gay & Lesbian Review wrote that "Davidson’s efforts to sanitize" ancient Greek homosexuality "suit[s] more the conservative values of the present generation," while Dover's approach cattered more to the sensibilities of the sexual liberation movement of the 1970s.

== Reception ==
A number of scholars of the field of classical history have described the book as an attempt to sanitize Ancient Greek history to the modern American audience of the 2000s, including while catering to American views on sex, homosexuality in the military, same-sex marriage and sexual promiscuity. A review on the Bryn Mawr Classical Review stated that Davidson's book had created "an anachronistically sanitized and romanticized picture of male same-sex desire and love in the ancient Greek world".

A review of the book on the Journal of Homosexuality described the book as a "flawed" study that is "more important for what it tries to achieve than for what it actually accomplishes". The review stated that Davidson's flawed translations had led him to "misrepresent or exaggerate what his sources actually say, thus generating false conclusions". The review compared Davidson's view of the past to those of some European artists from the late 19th century, including Belgian painter Jean Delville in his The School of Plato (1898), in that the work of those artists "reveals more about fin de siecle Europe than it does about [Greek] antiquity itself".

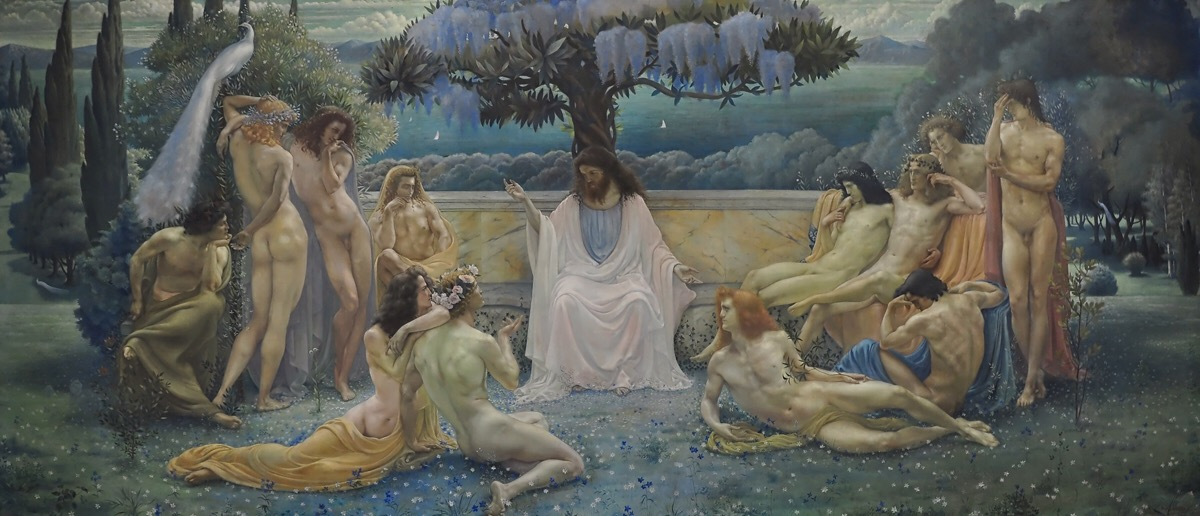
L’École de Platon by Jean Delville (1898)

A review on The Gay & Lesbian Review by James Jope described the book as "rather reactionary", considering the author's characterization of it as "a radical reappraisal". The reviewer wrote that Davidson had "mistranslat[ed]" a number of terms in Athenian law regarding the regulation of sex. Jope concluded his review by writing that "Less flamboyant scholars will have to work for years to repair our understanding of Greek homosexuality."

Professor David Woolwine wrote on the American Library Association's Rainbow Round Table book review website that Davidson's assessment of ancient sources "sometimes produces interpretations which are more fanciful than convincing." Wooldwine wrote that Davidson's view that ancient Greek homosexuality was largely focused on homosexual coupling was "somewhat controversial". He also agreed with Davidson's view that the characteristics of same-sex desire differed across ancient Greek cities.
