= Christian de la Huerta =

American spiritualist

- Born: Havana, Cuba
- Education: Tulane University
- Occupations: Writer, public speaker, facilitator, consultant, advocate, commentator
- Years active: 1990s - Present
- Known for: Breathwork advocacy; Spiritual, Self-improvement, and LGBTQ literature
- Notable work: Coming Out Spiritually: The Next Step (1999), Awakening the Soul of Power (2020)

Christian de la Huerta is an author, public figure, spiritual and LGBTQ leader.

== Background ==
De la Huerta was born in Havana, Cuba and is the son of prominent Cuban psychiatrist René de la Huerta. His family left Cuba when he was ten and he spent the rest of his childhood and early adulthood in Milledgeville, Georgia and Miami, Florida. He is an alumnus of Belen Jesuit Preparatory and then graduated with honors in psychology from Tulane University. After residing in San Francisco for twenty years, de la Huerta is currently residing again in South Florida within the Coconut Grove area.

== Career ==
De la Huerta's career has focused on personal transformation and he is an active public speaker, seminar leader, group facilitator, and consultant on the subject. Informed by his spiritual studies and psychology background, one important focus of his career has been the healing practice of breathwork. In 2000 he founded Soulful Power, a South Florida-based organization that hosts spiritual breathwork retreats, workshops, and offers coaching services. Soulful Power has offered remote retreats to locations including Hawaii, California, New Mexico, Peru, China, Southern France, and Egypt.

De la Huerta first became a national figure following the release of his acclaimed 1999 book Coming Out Spiritually: The Next Step. In it he presents the spiritual roles LGBTQ people have fulfilled throughout history and across many cultures, and organizes them into ten archetypes. The book was chosen by Publishers Weekly as one of the ten best religion books of 1999, and was also nominated for a Lambda Literary Award.

De la Huerta has since become an influential writer and speaker on spiritual, LGBTQ, and self-development topics. His writing has appeared in significant LGBTQ outlets such as The Advocate, Genre, OUT and others. He has also been a contributor to mainstream media outlets such as The Huffington Post as well as ABC News and Good Morning America and has been interviewed by Medium and The Advocate. Throughout his career de la Huerta has been covered by the Asheville Citizen-Times, York Daily Record, San Francisco Examiner, Yahoo! Finance, and discussed in the 2016 book Postcolonial Practice of Ministry: Leadership, Liturgy, and Interfaith Engagement.

On April 6, 2013, he delivered a TEDx Talk titled "The Power of Breath" at the Missouri Theatre in Columbia, Missouri.

De la Huerta's second book, Awakening the Soul of Power, was released in October 2020 and is the first installment of "Calling All Heroes," a three part series. The book received early high-profile endorsements from singer Gloria Estefan, theologian Matthew Fox, and leading Civil Rights activist David Mixner. The book debuted at number 1 and number 4 in Amazon's Psychology and Religion Bestseller category in its paperback and hardcover formats, respectively.
