= Barrie Jean Borich =

American writer

- Occupations: Memoirist, academic
- Spouse: Linnea Stenson
- Writing career
- Period: 1990s-present
- Notable works: My Lesbian Husband: Landscapes of a Marriage, Body Geographic

Barrie Jean Borich is an American writer. She is best known for her memoirs My Lesbian Husband: Landscapes of a Marriage, which won a Stonewall Book Award in 2000 and was a shortlisted Lambda Literary Award nominee for Lesbian Biography at the 12th Lambda Literary Awards, and Body Geographic, which won the Lambda for Lesbian Biography/Memoir at the 26th Lambda Literary Awards.

Originally from Chicago, Illinois, she spent much of her adult life living in Minneapolis, Minnesota until returning to Chicago in 2012 to teach creative writing at DePaul University.

== Works ==
- Restoring the Color of Roses (1993, ISBN 978-1563410277)
- My Lesbian Husband: Landscapes of a Marriage (1999, ISBN 978-1555973100)
- Body Geographic (2013, ISBN 978-0803239852)
