= Raquel Gutiérrez =

Mexican academic

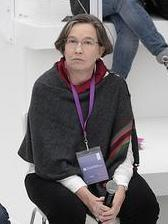
Raquel Gutiérrez in 2017.

Raquel Gutiérrez is a Mexican academic working as a professor of sociology at the Autonomous University of Puebla in Mexico.

== Background ==
Raquel Gutiérrez Aguilar was born in Mexico. In the 1980s she was one of the founding members of the EGTK (Túpac Katari Guerrilla Army) in Bolivia. She served a prison term in the 1990s, following which she returned to Mexico and wrote a doctoral dissertation on militant politics in Bolivia.

== Rhythms of the Pachakuti ==
Rhythms of the Pachakuti: Indigenous Uprising and State Power in Bolivia by Raquel Gutiérrez Aguilar was published by Duke University Press in 2014. The book deals with popular militancy in Bolivia between 2000 and 2005.
