= Donna Minkowitz =

American writer and journalist

Donna Minkowitz (born 1964) is an American writer and journalist. She became known for her coverage of gay and lesbian politics and culture in The Village Voice from the late 1980s through the mid-1990s, for which she won a GLAAD Media Award.

== Early life and education ==
Minkowitz grew up in New York City and graduated from Hunter College High School in 1981.

== Career ==
In 1998, she published the memoir Ferocious Romance: What My Encounters With the Right Taught Me About Sex, God, and Fury (the Free Press). In that book, she went undercover with several anti-gay Christian Right groups including Focus on the Family and wrote about the things that she, a lesbian leftist, found she had in common with them.

In 1999, she penned a controversial creative nonfiction piece for Salon.com about the Matthew Shepard murder, "Russell, Aaron and Me," that explored the emotions of his 21-year-old killers in terms of the terror of sex and intimacy.

As part of the preparation for Ferocious Romance, Minkowitz disguised herself as a 16-year-old Christian evangelical boy to write about the Christian right men's group the Promise Keepers for Ms. Magazine in 1995. That article, in which she argued that the Promise Keepers movement was both good and bad for women and feminism, won Minkowitz an Exceptional Merit Media Award for the piece from the National Women's Political Caucus and Radcliffe College.

In 1995, Minkowitz also contributed an essay, "Giving It Up: Orgasm, Fear, and Femaleness" to the influential anthology To Be Real: Telling the Truth and Changing the Face of Feminism, edited by Rebecca Walker.

In the decade beginning in the year 2000, Minkowitz underwent treatment for repetitive strain injury in her arms and shoulders due to computer use, and began work on a book combining memoir and fantasy called Growing Up Golem, which was published in September 2013.

In 2015, she began writing a regular restaurant column called Morsels in Gay City News, an LGBTQ newspaper in New York City.

She reported on the Brandon Teena story, and her Village Voice article on the subject was said by director Kimberly Peirce to have been the original inspiration for the film Boys Don't Cry.

== Awards and honors ==
Minkowitz won a GLAAD Media Award. Newsweek Magazine listed her as one of "30 gay power brokers" in the country in 1993. She won a Lambda Literary Award for her memoir, Ferocious Romance.
