= Joan Schenkar =

American playwright and biographer (1942–2021)

Joan Schenkar (15 August 1942 - 5 May 2021) was an American writer. She is known for her biographies of writer Patricia Highsmith, and Dorothy Wilde, as well as for the production of several of her plays in New York in the 1980s, including Signs of Life, Cabin Fever, and The Last of Hitler.

== Biography ==
Joan Marlene Schenkar was born on 15 August 1942 in Seattle. Her parents, Maurice and Marlene Schenkar, were involved in real estate. She studied literature at Bennington College in Vermont, working with Stanley Edgar Hyman, the literary critic and writer for The New Yorker at the time. She developed a close friendship with Hyman's wife, the writer Shirley Jackson. Schenkar completed her graduate education at University of California at Berkeley and State University of New York at Stony Brook.

Schenkar went on to purchase a farm in Vermont, and divided her time between Vermont, Paris, and New York. In New York, she lived for a while at the Chelsea Hotel and later on Cornelia Street in Greenwich Village. She owned an apartment in Paris; Umberto Eco was one of her neighbors. She died there on 5 May 2021, and was buried in Père Lachaise Cemetery. Schenkar was Jewish and lesbian.

== Career ==
Schenkar began writing plays for production in the 1980s. Her play, Signs of Life was staged at the American Place Theater in 1979, and was followed by two more productions, Cabin Fever and The Universal Wolf. A collection of six of her plays was later published as Signs of Life: 6 Comedies of Menace. Schenkar went on to teach creative writing at the School for the Visual Arts, New York, and was a fellow and playwright in residence at several theatres, including the Polish Laboratory Theater (1977), Joseph Chaikin's Winter Project (1977–78), Florida Studio Theater (1980), Theater am Halleshen Ufer, Berlin (1995), and MacDowell Colony (1980). During her career as a playwright, she received grants from the New York State Council on the Arts (1986, 1989, 1992), was a Fellow of the National Endowment for the Arts (1981–82), was nominated for an Obie Award for her play Cabin Fever, and won the Playwright's Forum Competition in 1984. During her career as a playwright, she received over 40 grants, fellowships, and awards for her work, including 7 grants from the National Endowment for the Arts. Her play The Last of Hitler attracted critical attention for her account of fascism in America through surreal, darkly comic depictions.

In 2000, Schenkar published a biography of Dorothy Wilde, titled Truly Wilde: The Unsettling Story of Dolly Wilde, Oscar’s Unusual Niece.

In 2009, she published a biography of the writer Patricia Highsmith, The Talented Miss Highsmith: The Secret Life and Serious Art of Patricia Highsmith, utilising archives and previously unpublished material about Highsmith's life. The biography received positive reviews, with Jeanette Winterson writing in the New York Times that Schenkar's choice of a non-linear narrative enabled her to grapple with the significant amount of detail and information available, concluding that the book was... "witty, sharp and light-handed, a considerable achievement given the immense detail of this biography." Publishers Weekly praised her 'impeccable' research and reviewed the book positively, calling it "...a compelling portrait" of Highsmith. The book won the Lambda Literary Award for Lesbian Memoir or Biography in 2010, was a 2010 New York Times Notable Book, 2009 Edgar Award nominee, and 2009 Agatha Award nominee, in addition to being a 'Pick of the Week' for Publishers Weekly.

== Bibliography ==
- The Talented Miss Highsmith: The Secret Life and Serious Art of Patricia Highsmith ISBN 9-781-42996-1011
- Truly Wilde: The Unsettling Story of Dolly Wilde, Oscar’s Unusual Niece ISBN 9-780-306810-794
- Signs of Life: 6 Comedies of Menace (Wesleyan University Press) ISBN 9-780-81956-3224
