= Jenn Shapland =

American writer

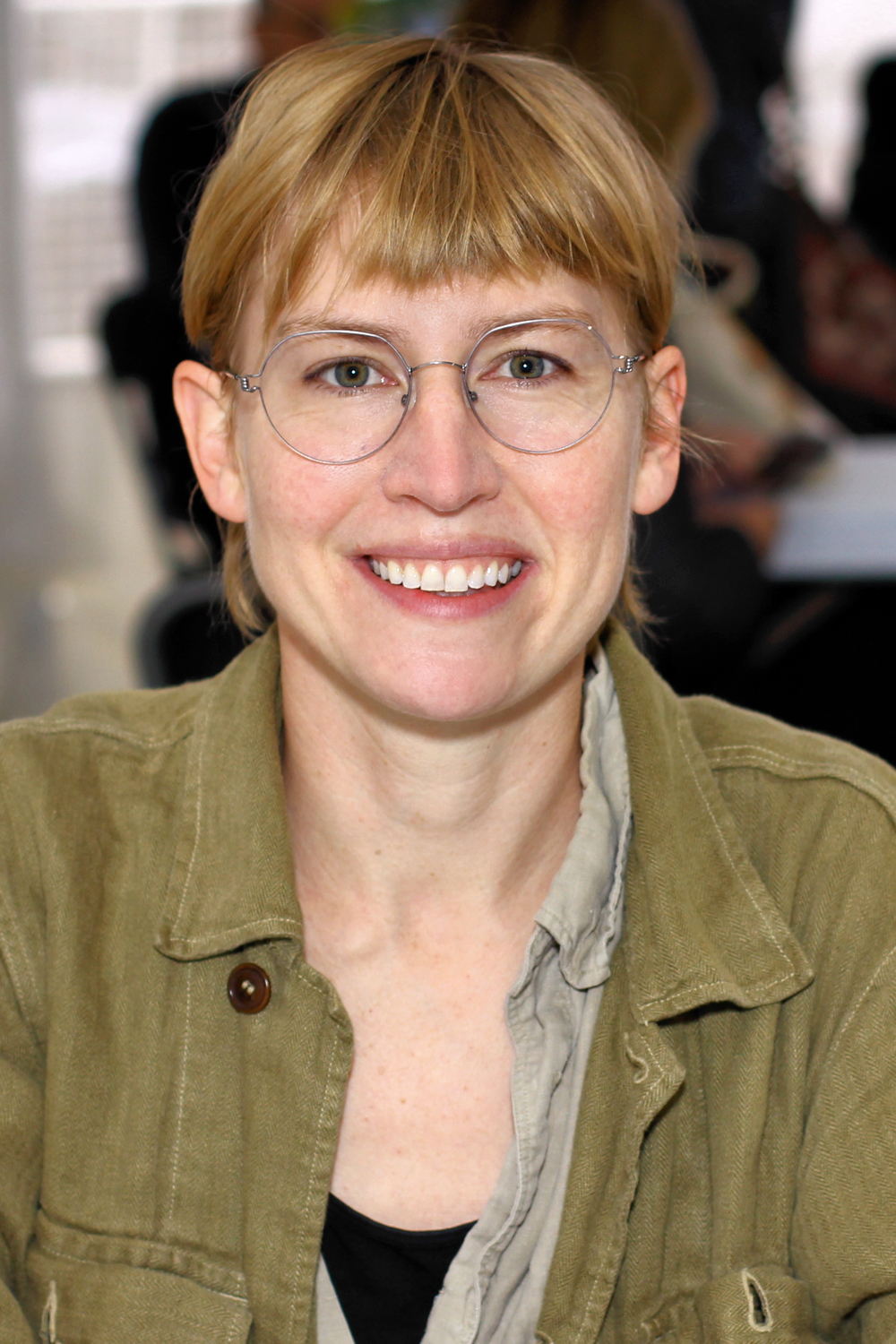
Shapland at the 2023 Texas Book Festival

Jenn Shapland is an American writer and archivist. Her essay "Finders, Keepers" won a Pushcart Prize in 2017, and her memoir, My Autobiography of Carson McCullers, won the Lambda Literary Award for Lesbian Memoir in 2021.

== Personal life ==
Shapland lives in New Mexico. She received her PhD in English from the University of Texas at Austin.

== Career ==
Aside from writing, Shapland is an adjunct instructor in the Creative Writing Department at the Institute of American Indian Arts in Santa Fe, as well as an archivist for a visual artist.

== My Autobiography of Carson McCullers (2020) ==
My Autobiography of Carson McCullers is a memoir, published February 4, 2020 by Tin House Books. The book received the following accolades:

- National Book Award for Nonfiction finalist (2020)
- Lambda Literary Award for Lesbian Memoir/Biography winner (2021)
- Stonewall Book Award honor book (2021)
- Christian Gauss Award (2021)

== Thin Skin (2023) ==
Thin Skin is a book of essays, published by Penguin Random House in 2023.
