= Mary Cappello =

American writer and professor of English and Creative Writing

- Education: State University of New York, Buffalo (Ph.D., M.A.), Dickinson College, B.A.
- Known for: Experimental prose, creative nonfiction, lyric essay, multi-genre, Italian American themes, gender and sexuality, cultural criticism
- Scientific career
- Fields: English, Creative Nonfiction, Medical Humanities
- Workplaces: University of Rhode Island

Mary Cappello is a writer and professor of English and Creative Writing at the University of Rhode Island. She is the author of five books of literary nonfiction, and her essays and experimental prose have been published in The Georgia Review, Salmagundi and Cabinet Magazine. Her work has been featured in The New York Times, Salon, The Huffington Post, in guest author blogs for Powell's Books, and on six occasions as Notable Essay of the Year in Best American Essays. A 2011 Guggenheim Fellow in Creative Arts/Nonfiction, she recently received a 2015 Berlin Prize from The American Academy in Berlin, a fellowship awarded to scholars, writers, composers, and artists who represent the highest standards of excellence in their fields.

== Education ==
Cappello is originally from Darby, Pennsylvania, a suburb outside Philadelphia. She received her Ph.D. and M.A. from State University of New York, Buffalo, and her B.A. from Dickinson College. Cappello has taught at the University of Rhode Island, as a Fulbright Lecturer at the Gorky Literary Institute in Moscow, Russia, and at the University of Rochester.

== Publications and works ==
=== Literary nonfiction: Books ===
- Life Breaks In: A Mood Almanack, University of Chicago Press, October 2016.
- Swallow: Foreign Bodies, Their Ingestion, Inspiration, and the Curious Doctor Who Extracted Them. The New Press. 2011. ISBN 978-1595583956.
- Called Back: My Reply to Cancer, My Return to Life. Alyson Books. 2009. ISBN 978-1593501501.
- Awkward: A Detour. Bellevue Literary Press. 2007. ISBN 978-1934137017.
- Night Bloom: An Italian-American Life. Beacon Press. 1999. ISBN 0807072176.

=== Essays and experimental prose print ===
- "Mood Rooms," chosen as the annual Meridel Le Sueur Essay, Water~Stone Review, Fall 2015.
- "Wending Artifice: Creative Nonfiction and our Century’s Turn," in Maria De Battista and Emily Wittman, ed. (22 May 2014). The Cambridge Companion to Autobiography. Cambridge University Press, 2014: 237–252. ISBN 9781107609181.
- "Contact," in Jacqueline Stacey and Janet Wolff, ed. (22 October 2013). Writing Otherwise: Experiments in Cultural Criticism. University of Manchester Press, 2013: 34–44. ISBN 978-0-7190-8942-8.
- "My Secret, Private Errand (An Essay on Love and Theft)," Salmagundi, Fall 2013-Winter 2014, nos. 180–181: 135–183.
- "objective correlatives: a trialogue on love," Hotel Amerika, volume 8, no. 2, Spring 2010, 7–15.
- "Losing Consciousness to a Lost Art," Michigan Quarterly Review, Spring 2007, 329–338.
- "The Trees are Aflame" from My Commie Sweetheart: Scenes from a Queer Friendship, 2004.

=== Essays and experimental prose on-line ===
- "Courting the Peculiar: The Ever-changing Queerness of Creative Nonfiction" a series of essays, sound texts and performances on creative nonfiction as a queer genre, Slag Glass City, December 2014.
- "Flow," a lyric essay for Bending Genre: Toward a Theory of Creative Nonfiction, April 2013.
- "Voluptuously, Expansively, Historically, Contradictorily: Essaying the Interview" with David Lazar for The Conversant: Interview Projects, Talk Poetries, Embodied Inquiry, November 2013.
- "Lyric Essay as Perversion: Channeling Djuna Barnes," TriQuarterly, September 2014.
- "Disconcerting Pleasures; or, The Mysterious Unknowability of the Mind: A Conversation with Mary Cappello and Christine Montross", for Bellevue Literary Press Conversation Series between doctors and artists, May 23, 2014.

== Awards and recognition ==
- Berlin Prize, American Academy in Berlin, Individual Fellowship, 2015.
- The University of Rhode Island Foundation Scholarly Excellence Award, 2015. Nominated in 2014, 2013.
- John Simon Guggenheim Memorial Foundation Fellowship in Creative Arts/Nonfiction.
- GAMMA Award for Best Feature from The Magazine Association of the Southeast for "Getting the News: A Signer among Signs," The Georgia Review, volume 63, number 2, Summer 2009.
- Teacher of the Year Award, University of Rochester.
- The Bechtel Prize for Educating the Imagination from the Teachers and Writers Collaborative, NYC for the essay, "Can Creative Writing Be Taught?"
- The Dorothea Lange–Paul Taylor Prize, with photographer Paola Ferrario, Center for Documentary Studies, Duke University, for "Pane Amaro/Bitter Bread: The Struggle of New Immigrants to Italy," 2001.
- Fulbright Fellowship, Maxim Gorky Literature Institute, Moscow, Russia, 2001.

== External links and interviews ==
- Interview with Mutter Museum Director Robert Hicks for No Bones About It on the Chevalier Jackson Foreign Body Collection
- Interview with LA Times Carolyn Kellogg, on the most important book Cappello read in school
- Interview with Julie Bolcer for Here! TV, on writing breast cancer and its politics, posted by Antonio Gonzalez Cerna from Lambda Literary
- Interview with Sarah Kruse, on writing the strange and non-narrative assemblage
- The Curious Collection of Swallowed Objects, Radio Times with Marty Moss-Coane, March 23, 2011.
- Awkward: A Detour with Celeste Quinn for Illinois Public Radio's Afternoon Magazine, February 27, 2008.
- An illustrated reading, "The Chevalier Jackson Foreign Body Collection and the Art It Has Inspired," at St Bartholomew's Hospital Pathology Museum and Gallery, London, England, June 2012.
