= 35th Lambda Literary Awards =

2023 awards ceremony for LGBTQ+ literature

- Awarded for: Works of LGBTQ+ literature
- Date: June 11, 2024
- Location: New York City
- Country: United States
- Presented by: Lambda Literary Foundation
- Eligibility: LGBTQ+ storytelling, published in the US in the preceding year
- Website: lambdaliterary.org/awards

The finalists for the 35th Lambda Literary Awards, which honor works of LGBT literature published in 2022, were announced on March 15, 2023. The winners were announced in New York on June 9.

== Special awards ==
Special awards recipients
Category	Winner	Ref.
J. Michael Samuel Prize for Emerging Writers Over 50	Christopher Tradowski	
Jeanne Córdova Prize for Lesbian/Queer Nonfiction	Jaquira Diaz	
Jim Duggins Outstanding Mid-Career Novelists' Prize	Aaron Hamburger, Ryka Aoki	
Judith A. Markowitz Emerging Writer Award	Maya Salameh, Naseem Jamnia	
Randall Kenan Prize for Black LGBTQ Fiction	Eboni J. Dunbar	

== Nominees and winners ==
35th Lambda Literary Awards winners and finalists
Category	Author	Title	Publisher	Result	Ref.
Bisexual Fiction	Gwendolyn Kiste	Reluctant Immortals	Simon & Schuster/Saga Press	Winner	
Bisexual Fiction	A. J. Bermudez	Stories No One Hopes Are About Them	University of Iowa Press	Finalist	
Bisexual Fiction	Akil Kumarasamy	Meet Us by the Roaring Sea	Farrar, Straus and Giroux	Finalist	
Bisexual Fiction	Bushra Rehman	Roses, In the Mouth of a Lion	Flatiron Books	Finalist	
Bisexual Fiction	Nishant Batsha	Mother Ocean Father Nation	Ecco/HarperCollins	Finalist	
Bisexual Nonfiction	Maria San Filippo	Appropriate Behavior	McGill–Queen's University Press	Winner	
Bisexual Nonfiction	John Brady McDonald	Carrying It Forward: Essays from Kistahpinanihk	Wolsak and Wynn Publishers	Finalist	
Bisexual Nonfiction	Liz Scheier	Never Simple: A Memoir	Henry Holt and Company / Macmillan Publishers	Finalist	
Bisexual Nonfiction	Rachel Krantz	Open: An Uncensored Memoir of Love, Liberation, and Non-Monogamy	Harmony Books / Penguin Random House	Finalist	
Bisexual Nonfiction	CJ Hauser	The Crane Wife	Knopf Doubleday Publishing Group	Finalist	
Bisexual Poetry	Nicky Beer	Real Phonies and Genuine Fakes	Milkweed Editions	Winner	
Bisexual Poetry	Gabrielle Octavia Rucker	Dereliction	The Song Cave	Finalist	
Bisexual Poetry	James Fujinami Moore	indecent hours	Four Way Books	Finalist	
Bisexual Poetry	Karyna McGlynn	50 Things Kate Bush Taught Me About the Multiverse	Sarabande Books	Finalist	
Bisexual Poetry	Rebecca Hawkes	Meat Lovers	Auckland University Press	Finalist	
Comics	Sas Milledge	Mamo	BOOM! Studios	Winner	
Comics	Will Betke-Brunswick	A Pros and Cons List for Strong Feelings	Tin House	Finalist	
Comics	Gabriel Ebensperger, trans. by Kelley D. Salas	Gay Giant	Street Noise Books	Finalist	
Comics	Melanie Gillman	Other Ever Afters	Random House Graphic	Finalist	
Comics	Sarah Winifred Searle	The Greatest Thing	First Second Books	Finalist	
Gay Fiction	Danny Ramadan	The Foghorn Echoes	Canongate Books	Winner	
Gay Fiction	Marcial Gala, trans. by Anna Kushner	Call Me Cassandra	Farrar, Straus and Giroux	Finalist	
Gay Fiction	Arinze Ifeakandu	God's Children Are Little Broken Things	A Public Space	Finalist	
Gay Fiction	João Gilberto Noll, trans. by Edgar Garbelotto	Hugs and Cuddles	Two Lines Press	Finalist	
Gay Fiction	Rasheed Newson	My Government Means To Kill Me	Flatiron Books	Finalist	
Gay Memoir/Biography	Edgar Gomez	High-Risk Homosexual	Soft Skull Press	Winner	
Gay Memoir/Biography	Seán Hewitt	All Down Darkness Wide: A Memoir	Penguin Group	Finalist	
Gay Memoir/Biography	Jim Elledge	An Angel in Sodom	Chicago Review Press	Finalist	
Gay Memoir/Biography	Ron Goldberg	Boy with the Bullhorn: A Memoir and History of ACT UP New York	Empire State Editions	Finalist	
Gay Memoir/Biography	Jesse Leon	I'm Not Broken	Vintage Books	Finalist	
Gay Poetry	Padraig Regan	Some Integrity	Carcanet Press	Winner	
Gay Poetry	Saeed Jones	Alive at the End of the World	Coffee House Press	Finalist	
Gay Poetry	Aldo Amparán	Brother Sleep	Alice James Books	Finalist	
Gay Poetry	Angelo Nikolopoulos	Pleasure	Four Way Books	Finalist	
Gay Poetry	Chris Tse	Super Model Minority	Auckland University Press	Finalist	
Gay Romance	Kosoko Jackson	I'm So Not Over You	Berkley Romance	Winner	
Gay Romance	Marie Sinclair	Forever After	Self-published	Finalist	
Gay Romance	A. M. Johnson	Forever, Con Amor	Self-published	Finalist	
Gay Romance	Felice Stevens	Just One Night	Self-published	Finalist	
Gay Romance	Fearne Hill	Two Tribes	Self-published	Finalist	
Lesbian Fiction	K-Ming Chang	Gods of Want	One World	Winner	
Lesbian Fiction	Mecca Jamilah Sullivan	Big Girl	W. W. Norton & Company	Finalist	
Lesbian Fiction	Mónica Ojeda, trans. by Sarah Booker	Jawbone	Coffee House Press	Finalist	
Lesbian Fiction	Leila Mottley	Nightcrawling	Alfred A. Knopf	Finalist	
Lesbian Fiction	Julia Armfield	Our Wives Under the Sea	Flatiron Books	Finalist	
Lesbian Memoir/Biography	Kathryn Schulz	Lost & Found: Reflections on Grief, Gratitude, and Happiness	Random House	Winner	
Lesbian Memoir/Biography	Raquel Gutiérrez	Brown Neon	Coffee House Press	Finalist	
Lesbian Memoir/Biography	Putsata Reang	Ma and Me	Farrar, Straus and Giroux	Finalist	
Lesbian Memoir/Biography	Chris Belcher	Pretty Baby: A Memoir	Avid Reader Press / Simon & Schuster	Finalist	
Lesbian Memoir/Biography	Neema Avashia	Another Appalachia: Coming Up Queer and Indian in a Mountain Place	West Virginia University Press	Finalist	
Lesbian Poetry	Shelley Wong	As She Appears	YesYes Books	Winner	
Lesbian Poetry	Natalie Wee	Beast at Every Threshold	Arsenal Pulp Press	Finalist	
Lesbian Poetry	Courtney Faye Taylor	Concentrate	Graywolf Press	Finalist	
Lesbian Poetry	Brynne Rebele-Henry	Prelude	University of Pittsburgh Press	Finalist	
Lesbian Poetry	Rage Hezekiah	Yearn	Diode Editions	Finalist	
Lesbian Romance	Nan Campbell	The Rules of Forever	Bold Strokes Books	Winner	
Lesbian Romance	Susie Dumond	Queerly Beloved	Dial Press	Finalist	
Lesbian Romance	Aurora Rey	Hard Pressed	Bold Strokes Books	Finalist	
Lesbian Romance	E. J. Noyes	If I Don't Ask	Bella Books	Finalist	
Lesbian Romance	K. B. Draper	Southbound and Down	K.B. Draper, LLC	Finalist	
LGBTQ Anthology	Julie R. Enszer and Elena Gross	OutWrite: The Speeches That Shaped LGBTQ Literary Culture	Rutgers University Press	Winner	
LGBTQ Anthology	Michael Walsh (Ed.)	Queer Nature: A Poetry Anthology	Autumn House Press	Finalist	
LGBTQ Anthology	Elias Jahshan	This Arab is Queer: An Anthology by LGBTQ+ Arab Writers	Saqi Books	Finalist	
LGBTQ Anthology	Laura Erickson-Schroth	Trans Bodies, Trans Selves: A Resource by and for Transgender Communities (2nd ed.)	Oxford University Press	Finalist	
LGBTQ Anthology	Isabela Oliveira and Jed Sabin	Xenocultivars: Stories of Queer Growth	Speculatively Queer	Finalist	
LGBTQ Children's	Wallace West	Mighty Red Riding Hood	Little, Brown Books for Young Readers	Winner	
LGBTQ Children's	Carole Boston Weatherford and Rob Sanders, illus. by Byron McCray	A Song for the Unsung: Bayard Rustin	Henry Holt Books for Young Readers	Finalist	
LGBTQ Children's	Hinaleimoana Wong-Kalu, Dean Hamer, and Joe Wilson, illus. by Daniel Sousa	Kapaemahu	Kokila	Finalist	
LGBTQ Children's	Nina LaCour	Mama and Mommy and Me in the Middle	Candlewick Press	Finalist	
LGBTQ Children's	Robb Pearlman, illus. by Dani Jones	The Sublime Ms. Stacks	Bloomsbury Publishing	Finalist	
LGBTQ Drama	Ho Ka Kei (Jeff Ho)	Iphigenia and the Furies (On Taurian Land) & Antigone: 方	Playwrights Canada Press	Winner	
LGBTQ Drama	kai fig taddei	Duecentomila	Playwrights Canada Press	Finalist	
LGBTQ Drama	Sikivu Hutchinson	Rock 'n' Roll Heretic	Self-published	Finalist	
LGBTQ Drama	Tom Ford (writer) and Alex Syiek (music and lyrics)	The Show on the Roof	Boise Contemporary Theater	Finalist	
LGBTQ Drama	Hansol Jung	Wolf Play	Samuel French, a Concord Theatricals Company	Finalist	
LGBTQ+ Romance and Erotica	Alison Cochrun	Kiss Her Once For Me	Atria Books	Winner	
LGBTQ+ Romance and Erotica	Ruby Barrett	The Romance Recipe	Carina Adores	Finalist	
LGBTQ+ Romance and Erotica	Meryl Wilsner	Mistakes Were Made	St. Martin's Griffin	Finalist	
LGBTQ+ Romance and Erotica	Edie Cay	A Lady's Finder	Self-published	Finalist	
LGBTQ+ Romance and Erotica	Joseph Brennan	Loose Lips: A Gay Sea Odyssey	Hard Crossing Press	Finalist	
LGBTQ Middle Grade	Maulik Pancholy	Nikhil Out Loud	HarperCollins/Balzer + Bray	Winner	
LGBTQ Middle Grade	David Levithan	Answers In the Pages	Alfred A. Knopf Books for Young Readers	Finalist	
LGBTQ Middle Grade	Kyle Lukoff	Different Kinds of Fruit	Dial Books for Young Readers	Finalist	
LGBTQ Middle Grade	Maggie Horne	Hazel Hill Is Gonna Win This One	HarperCollins/Clarion Books	Finalist	
LGBTQ Middle Grade	Michael Leali	The Civil War of Amos Abernathy	HarperCollins	Finalist	
LGBTQ Mystery	Hayley Scrivenor	Dirt Creek: A Novel	Flatiron Books	Winner	
LGBTQ Mystery	David C Dawson	A Death in Berlin	Park Creek Publishing	Finalist	
LGBTQ Mystery	Joshua Moehling	And There He Kept Her	Poisoned Pen Press	Finalist	
LGBTQ Mystery	Ann McMan	Dead Letters from Paradise	Bywater Books	Finalist	
LGBTQ Mystery	Lev A.C. Rosen	Lavender House	Forge Books	Finalist	
LGBTQ Nonfiction	Hafizah Augustus Geter	The Black Period: On Personhood, Race, and Origin	Random House	Winner	
LGBTQ Nonfiction	Sabrina Imbler	How Far the Light Reaches: A Life in Ten Sea Creatures	Little, Brown and Company	Finalist	
LGBTQ Nonfiction	Joseph Osmundson	Virology: Essays for the Living, the Dead, and the Small Things in Between	W.W. Norton & Company	Finalist	
LGBTQ Nonfiction	Ricky Tucker	And the Category Is...: Inside New York's Vogue, House, and Ballroom Community	Beacon Press	Finalist	
LGBTQ Nonfiction	Hugh Ryan	The Women's House of Detention: A Queer History of a Forgotten Prison	Bold Type Books, Hachette Book Group	Finalist	
LGBTQ Speculative Fiction	Lianyu Tan	The Wicked and the Willing: An F/F Gothic Horror Vampire Novel	Shattered Scepter Press	Winner	
LGBTQ Speculative Fiction	Sunyi Dean	Book Eaters	Tor Books	Finalist	
LGBTQ Speculative Fiction	Nghi Vo	Into the Riverlands	Tor.com	Finalist	
LGBTQ Speculative Fiction	Khan Wong	The Circus Infinite	Angry Robot	Finalist	
LGBTQ Speculative Fiction	Rob Hart	The Paradox Hotel	Ballantine Books	Finalist	
LGBTQ Studies	Darieck Scott	Keeping It Unreal: Black Queer Fantasy and Superhero Comics	New York University Press	Winner	
LGBTQ Studies	Mairead Sullivan	Lesbian Death: Desire and Danger between Feminist and Queer	University of Minnesota Press	Finalist	
LGBTQ Studies	Marlon B. Ross	Sissy Insurgencies: A Racial Anatomy of Unfit Manliness	Duke University Press	Finalist	
LGBTQ Studies	Vivian L. Huang	Surface Relations: Queer Forms of Asian American Inscrutability	Duke University Press	Finalist	
LGBTQ Studies	Jafari S. Allen	There's a Disco Ball Between Us: A Theory of Black Gay Life	Duke University Press	Finalist	
LGBTQ Young Adult	Sonora Reyes	The Lesbiana's Guide to Catholic School	Balzer + Bray/HarperCollins	Winner	
LGBTQ Young Adult	Vincent Tirado	Burn Down, Rise Up	Sourcebooks	Finalist	
LGBTQ Young Adult	Angeline Jackson with Susan McClelland	Funny Gyal: My Fight Against Homophobia in Jamaica	Dundurn Press	Finalist	
LGBTQ Young Adult	Anna-Marie McLemore	Lakelore	Feiwel & Friends	Finalist	
LGBTQ Young Adult	Jen Ferguson	The Summer of Bitter and Sweet	Heartdrum/HarperCollins	Finalist	
Transgender Fiction	Cat Fitzpatrick	The Call-Out	Seven Stories Press	Winner	
Transgender Fiction	James Hannaham	Didn't Nobody Give a Shit What Happened to Carlotta	Little, Brown and Company	Finalist	
Transgender Fiction	Izzy Wasserstein	All the Hometowns You Can't Stay Away From	Neon Hemlock	Finalist	
Transgender Fiction	Morgan Thomas	Manywhere	Farrar, Straus and Giroux	Finalist	
Transgender Fiction	Maya Deane	Wrath Goddess Sing	William Morrow and Company	Finalist	
Transgender Nonfiction	Emma Grove	The Third Person	Drawn & Quarterly	Winner	
Transgender Nonfiction	Kit Heyam	Before We Were Trans: A New History of Gender	Basic Books	Finalist	
Transgender Nonfiction	Cecilia Gentili	Faltas: Letters to Everyone in My Hometown Who Isn't My Rapist	LittlePuss Press	Finalist	
Transgender Nonfiction	Jeremiah Moss	Feral City: On Finding Liberation in Lockdown New York	W. W. Norton & Company	Finalist	
Transgender Nonfiction	Cameron Awkward-Rich	The Terrible We: Thinking with Trans Maladjustment	Duke University Press	Finalist	
Transgender Poetry	Kamden Ishmael Hilliard	MissSettl	Nightboat Books	Winner	
Transgender Poetry	Golden	A Dead Name That Learned How to Live	Game Over Books	Finalist	
Transgender Poetry	Kay Gabriel	A Queen in Bucks County	Nightboat Books	Finalist	
Transgender Poetry	Paul Tran	All the Flowers Kneeling	Penguin Books	Finalist	
Transgender Poetry	Prathna Lor	Emanations	Wolsak and Wynn Publishers	Finalist	
