= How Far the Light Reaches =

2022 book by Sabrina Imbler

How Far the Light Reaches: A Life in Ten Sea Creatures
- Author: Sabrina Imbler
- Audio read by: Sabrina Imbler
- Illustrator: Simon Ban
- Subject: Marine animals
- Genre: Memoir; science journalism
- Publisher: Little, Brown and Company, Chatto & Windus (United Kingdom), Hachette Audio (audiobook)
- Pages: 263
- ISBN: 9780316540537

How Far the Light Reaches: A Life in Ten Sea Creatures is a 2022 collection of essays by Sabrina Imbler, combining memoir with scientific writing about aquatic animals. It compares animal behaviors with Imbler's experiences, interweaving their narratives. It discusses Imbler's identity as nonbinary and biracial. The book received positive reception and won the 2023 Los Angeles Times Book Prize for Science and Technology.

How Far the Light Reaches consists of ten essays, each describing an animal and a story from Imbler's life. It begins with an essay about Imbler's childhood alongside the development of goldfish in fish bowls and rivers. An octopus species that starves itself while protecting its eggs is related to Imbler's and their mother's experience with eating disorder. The end of a relationship is described like the death of a whale. Yeti crabs in the inhospitable environment of hydrothermal vents are compared to queer community. The attack of the sand striker is used as metaphor for sexual assault. Other topics include hybrid animals, the collective movement of salps and the camouflage ability of cuttlefish. Thematically, the book addresses LGBTQ identity, the relationship between humans and nature, and the importance of community for survival.

== Background and publication ==
How Far the Light Reaches is the second book by science journalist Sabrina Imbler and their first essay collection. Some of their previous writing was about oceans, having been interested in the subject since their youth.

Imbler began writing How Far the Light Reaches as a 2018 column for Catapult Magazine, titled My Life in Sea Creatures, edited by Megha Majumdar. It was initially inspired by the story of an octopus that starved itself to protect its eggs; they wrote, "I thought of this octopus for years, unsure why she lingered in my mind until I realized she reminded me of my own mother and our relationship to disordered eating".

The book drew from Imbler's experiences as a queer, nonbinary, biracial writer in the United States. Imbler wrote focusing on their personal perspective rather than scientific objectivity. They viewed anthropomorphism of animals as a way to understand humans, writing in an opinion piece for The New York Times that, although anthropomorphism is seen as unscientific, it can help humans relate to things that seem different. The title refers to animal habitats so far from the sunlight that photosynthesis does not occur. Imbler writes, "This book takes its name from the vertical zones of the ocean, which are divided based on how far light reaches."

How Far the Light Reaches was published in June 2022 by Little, Brown and Company. It is illustrated by Simon Ban. In the United Kingdom, the book was published by Chatto & Windus under the title My Life in Sea Creatures. Imbler narrated the audiobook version, published by Hachette Audio.

== Summary ==
Goldfish in the wild

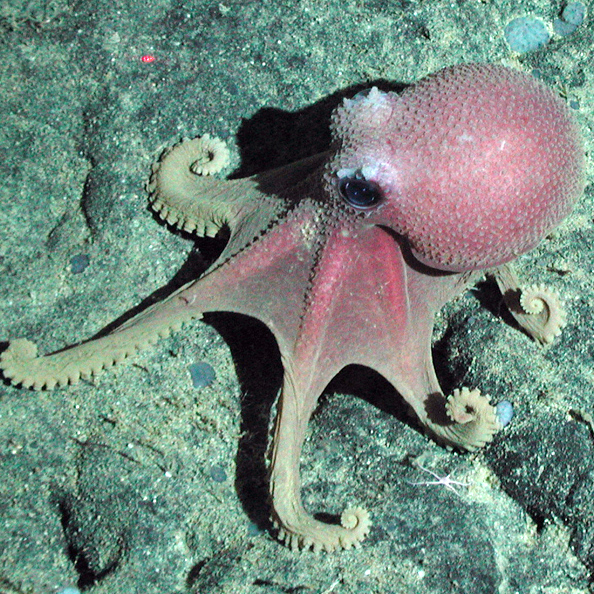
Graneledone boreopacifica

Yeti crabs dancing

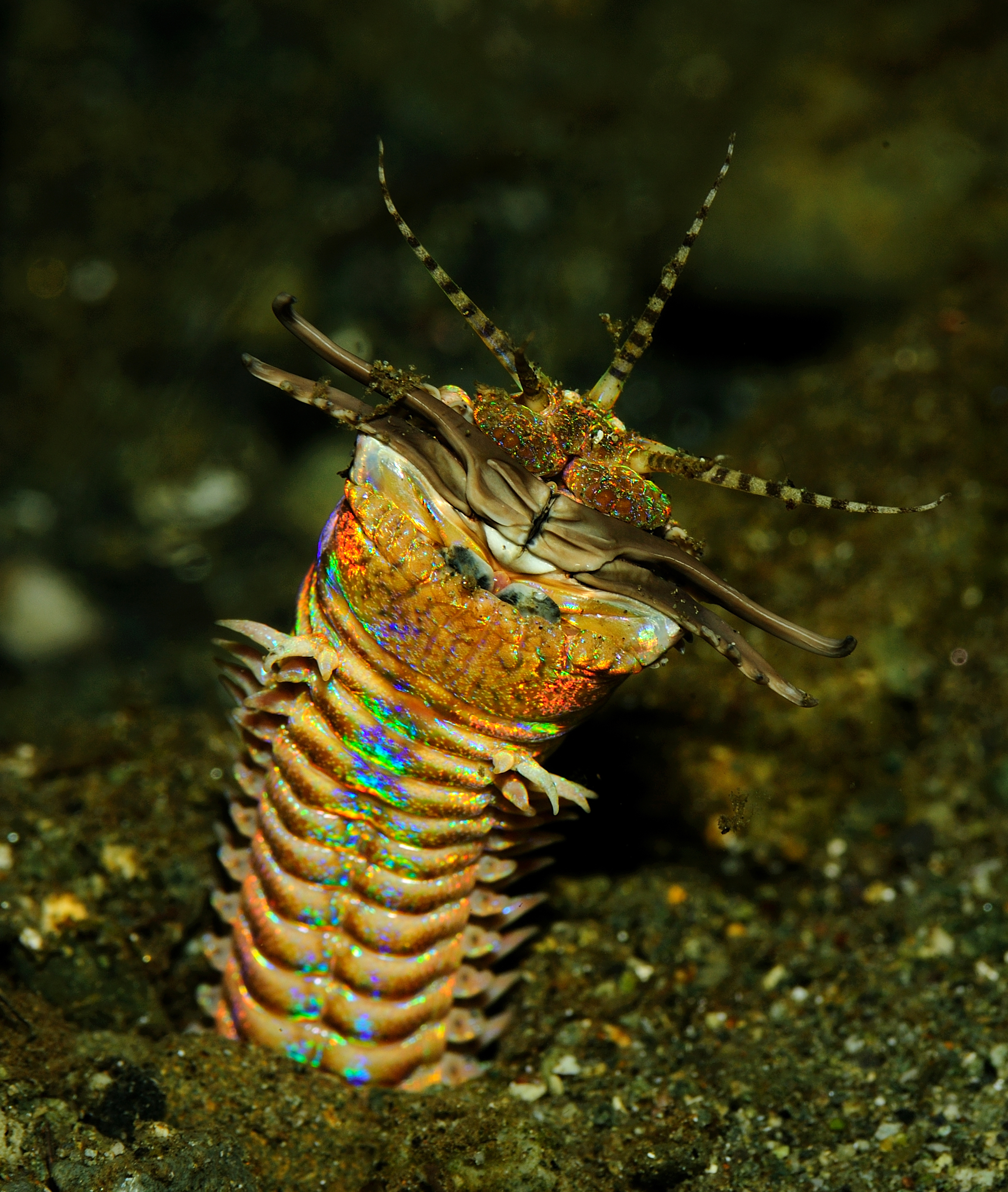
Sand striker

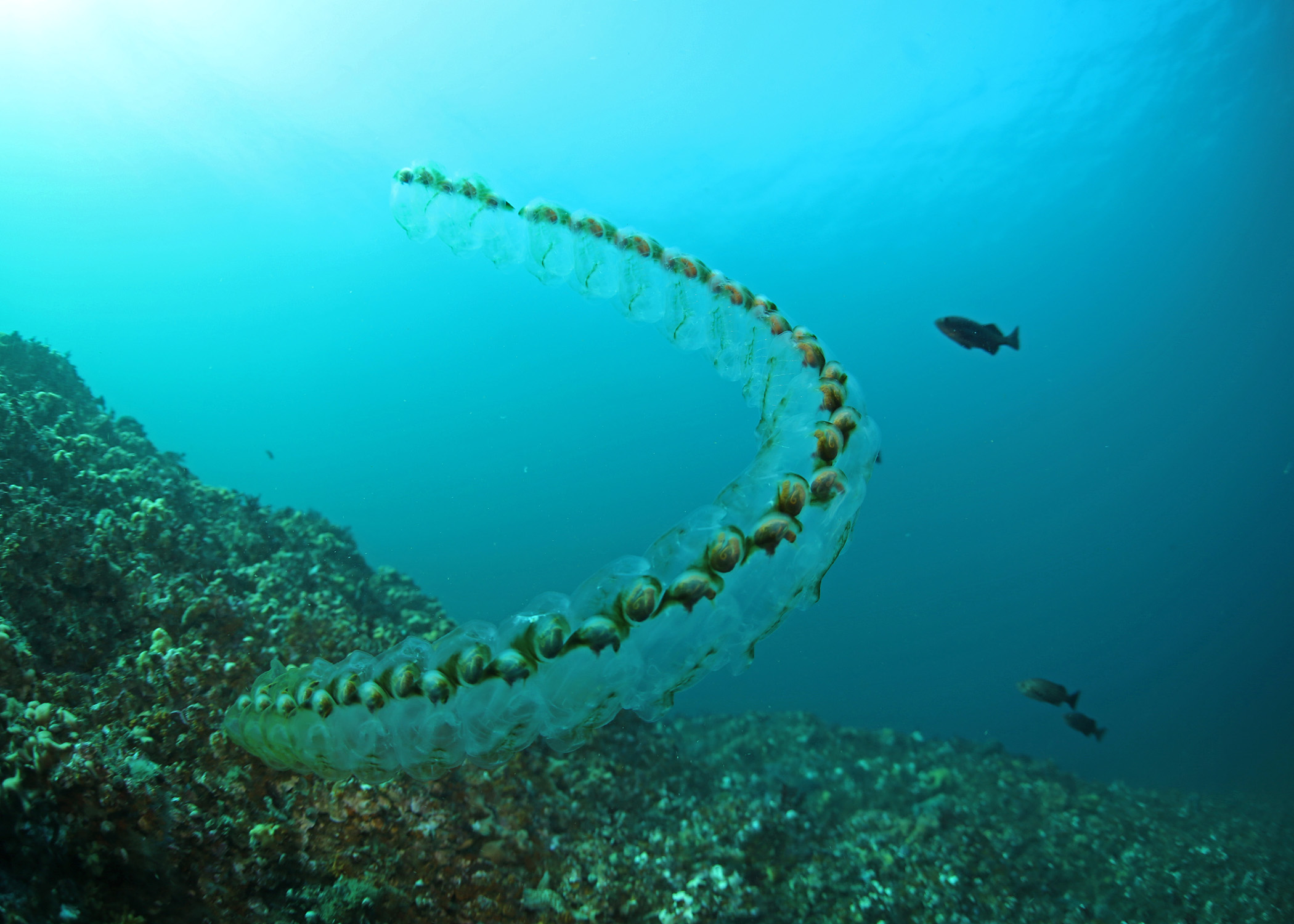
Colony of salps

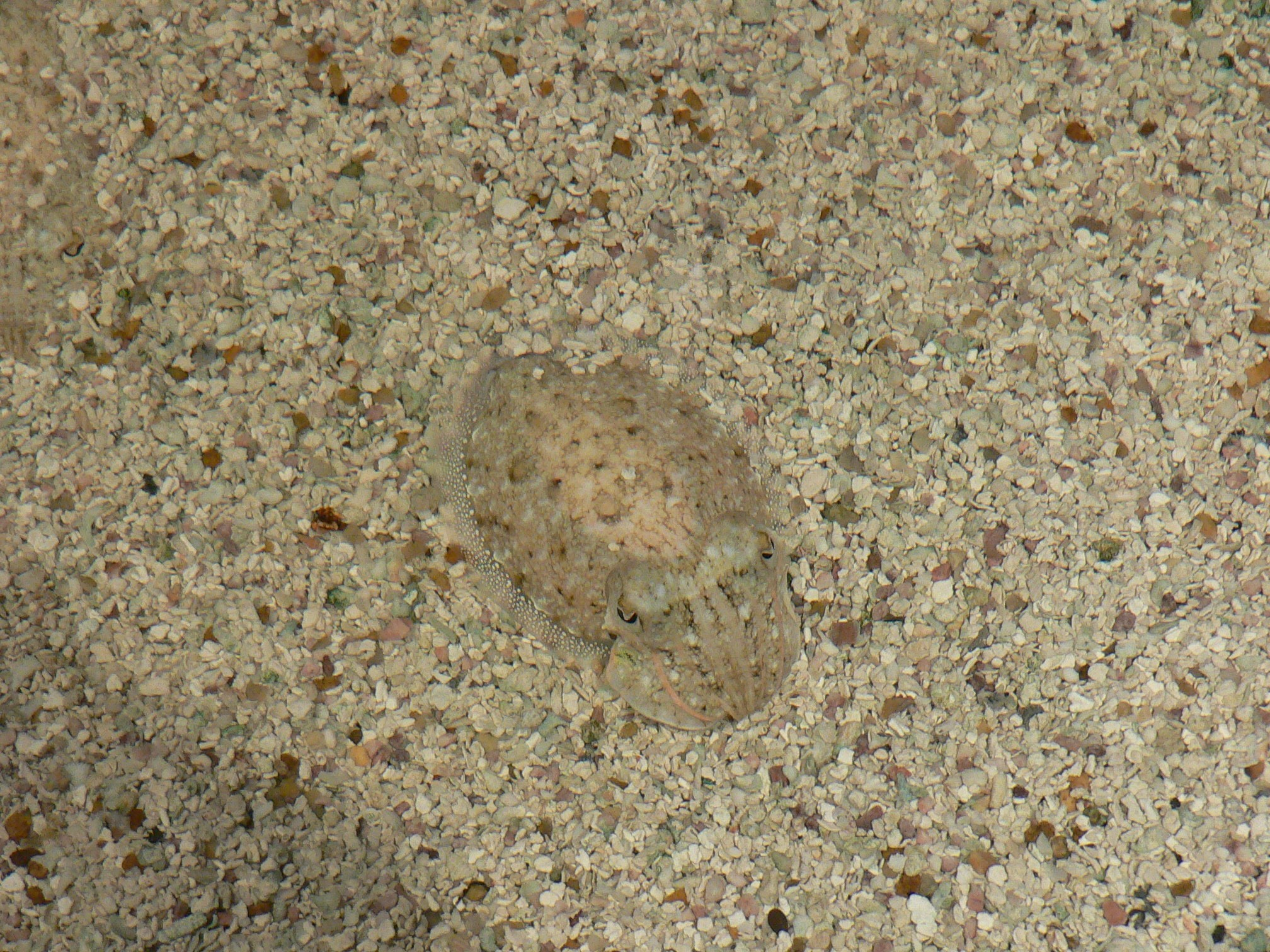
Camouflaged cuttlefish

Marine animals discussed in How Far the Light Reaches

How Far the Light Reaches combines memoir, science journalism and natural history. The book relates the diversity of oceanic life to Imbler's own characteristics. Although it is a work of nonfiction, it relies on both science and metaphor. The book describes compared these animals to Imbler's experiences and describes how they have inspired them creatively and personally. Many of the animals described differ from typical fish; several essays describe their extreme habitats or unique forms of survival. The book interweaves descriptions of marine animals with stories of Imbler, a format they call "braided" narratives.

Each of the book's essays features a different marine animal, along with a story from Imbler's life. They are not strictly chronological. There are ten essays:

1. "If You Flush a Goldfish" compares Imbler's childhood to a goldfish surviving in a small fish bowl. It could live much longer in the wild, growing so large as to disrupt its ecosystem. The essay opens with an account of thirteen-year-old Imbler protesting goldfish bowls: "The truth is that I was asked to leave the Petco, but I told everyone I was banned." It then describes Imbler's teenage years in a suburb, focused on rules and academics, before visiting again years later and having a lesbian encounter with a former classmate.
2. "My Mother and the Starving Octopus" describes the maternal behavior of the octopus species Graneledone boreopacifica which stays with its eggs for over four years—longer than any other animal—and refuses to eat until it dies. This is paralleled with Imbler's experience as a teenager with an eating disorder, avoiding eating due to their and their mother's ideals of thinness.
3. "My Grandmother and the Sturgeon" compares a Chinese sturgeon in an aquarium to Imbler's Chinese grandmother. The Chinese sturgeon travels down the Yangtze River, threatened by dams, and Imbler's grandmother took a similar route as a refugee during the Second Sino-Japanese War.
4. "How to Draw a Sperm Whale" discusses how the death of whales is examined through necropsy and uses a metaphorical "necropsy report" to examine the end of Imbler's first romantic relationship. The essay describes whale falls as well as a class they took on how whaling threatens whale populations.
5. "Pure Life" describes how yeti crabs thrive off of hydrothermal vents—far from the sunlight and inhospitable to other forms of life—where they group together and appear to dance as they feed. Imbler compares this to finding a community after college, upon moving to Seattle in 2017, where they felt lonely before finding a monthly dance party held by LGBTQ people of color.
6. "Beware the Sand Striker" presents the concept of predators through the sand striker, comparing its sudden, violent attacks to Imbler's experiences with sexual assault. Imbler notes how its prey, the sea breams, collectively defend themselves. The essay also discusses the criminal case of John and Lorena Bobbitt, which involved sexual abuse, as it inspired the term bobbitt to refer to the sand striker. Imbler writes that the "metaphor of predation is cheap", but the essay explores the ways people talk about predators.
7. "Hybrids" is about a hybrid specimen of a butterflyfish discovered in the 1970s, as well as Imbler's experience being biracial. It describes Imbler's fluctuating perceptions on their race and eventual comfort in having a romantic partner of the same race.
8. "We Swarm" remarks upon a colony of salps, which move each other toward a direction. Imbler observed what they would later identify as a salp colony at New York City's Riis Beach, where they, likewise, moved in a group. Imbler compares the salps' periodic appearance to the crowds of LGBTQ people during Pride Month.
9. "Morphing Like a Cuttlefish" uses the imagery of a cuttlefish changing its appearance as camouflage, including appearing to change sex, and compares it to their view of their own body and gender presentation. Imbler states that they must change their own body, unlike an organism that adapts through evolution.
10. "Us Everlasting" imagines being young again, inspired by the immortal jellyfish. Fourteen contributors respond to questions about this hypothetical.

== Reception ==
According to the review aggregator Bookmarks, How Far the Light Reaches received rave reviews. It received a starred review in Publishers Weekly, and the audiobook received a starred review in Booklist. Time Magazine included the book in its 2022 lists of the 10 best nonfiction books and 100 must-read books of the year. The book was popularized largely through being shared between friends, rather than purchased.

How Far the Light Reaches won the 2023 Los Angeles Times Book Prize for Science and Technology. Accepting the award, Imbler said, "Writing this book helped me come out as trans, which I can't recommend enough." The book was also a finalist for the 2023 Lambda Literary Award for LGBTQ+ Nonfiction.

== Themes ==
The book is a coming-of-age memoir that addresses concepts such as family, community, sexuality, gender, adaptation and self-discovery. The most significant narrative is of Imbler coming out—first as lesbian, then as nonbinary—and the book mentions several failed romantic relationships. Another major theme is their self-image of being biracial. Minor themes include beauty and body image, as well as moving, as Imbler lived in various parts of the United States. In the descriptions of animals, Imbler describes that community is necessary for survival, relating to their own experience of belongingness.

Ashia Ajani of Earth Island Journal writes that the book is about the relationship between humans and nature, showing the parallels between humans and animals as well as the ways in which science is decided by individuals' memories. Reviewers from The New York Times and Animal Studies Journal praised that the comparisons do not rely on excessive anthropomorphism. The book often focuses on the shortcomings and mistakes of scientists, such as accidentally killing a whale or failing to understand that yeti crabs can live in an ecosystem inhospitable to others. It also notes the environmental impact of humans on the ocean.

How Far the Light Reaches relates aquatic animals to LGBTQ identity, as did other books of the era, such as Voice of the Fish by Lars Horn. Thomas Dai of The Georgia Review considers these books part of a wider trend of literature on aquatic life from diverse perspectives, not purely scientific. Dai also states that the book provides a unique perspective on the queer coming-of-age narrative through descriptions of animals that are informative, not merely metaphorical. According to Maya L. Kapoor of Undark magazine, it is a work of queer ecology.
