= Los Angeles Times Book Prize for Science and Technology =

Annual literary prize

The Los Angeles Times Book Prize for Science and Technology, established in 1980, is a category of the Los Angeles Times Book Prize. Works are eligible during the year of their first US publication in English, though they may be written originally in languages other than English.

== Recipients ==
Los Angeles Times Book Prize for Science and Technology winners and finalists
| Year | Author | Title | Result | Ref. |
|---|---|---|---|---|
| 1989 | Frans de Waal | Peacemaking Among Primates | Winner | |
| 1989 | Francis Crick | What Mad Pursuit: A Personal View of Scientific Discovery | Finalist | |
| 1989 | F. Gonzalez-Crussi | The Five Senses | Finalist | |
| 1989 | David L. Hull | Science as a Process: An Evolutionary Account of the Social and Conceptual Development of Science | Finalist | |
| 1989 | Max F. Perutz | Is Science Necessary?: Essays on Science and Scientists | Finalist | |
| 1990 | Jane S. Smith | Patenting the Sun: Polio and the Salk Vaccine | Winner | |
| 1990 | Robert Scott Root-Bernstein | Discovering: Inventing and Solving Problems at the Frontiers of Scientific Knowledge | Finalist | |
| 1990 | Christopher Manes | Green Rage: Radical Environmentalism and the Unmaking of Civilization | Finalist | |
| 1990 | John Alcock | Sonoran Desert Summer | Finalist | |
| 1990 | John McPhee | The Control of Nature | Finalist | |
| 1991 | Grigori Medvedev | The Truth About Chernobyl | Winner | |
| 1991 | Dennis Overbye | Lonely Hearts of the Cosmos: The Story of the Scientific Quest for the Secret of the Universe | Finalist | |
| 1991 | William H. Calvin | The Ascent of Mind: Ice Age Climates and the Evolution of Intelligence | Finalist | |
| 1991 | Robert Kanigel | The Man Who Knew Infinity: A Life of the Genius Ramanujan | Finalist | |
| 1991 | Sy Montgomery | Walking With the Great Apes: Jane Goodall, Dian Fossey, Biruté Galdikas | Finalist | |
| 1992 | Jared Diamond | The Third Chimpanzee: The Evolution and Future of the Human Animal | Winner | |
| 1992 | Steven Levy | Artificial Life: A Report from the Frontier Where Computers Meet Biology | Finalist | |
| 1992 | John Gribbin | Blinded By The Light: New Theories About the Sun and the Search for Dark Matter | Finalist | |
| 1992 | Daniel C. Dennett | Consciousness Explained | Finalist | |
| 1992 | Stanley Coren | The Left-Hander Syndrome: The Causes & Consequences of Left-Handedness | Finalist | |
| 1993 | Daniel McNeill and Paul Freiberger | Fuzzy Logic: The Discovery of a Revolutionary Computer Technology -- and How It Is Changing Our World | Winner | |
| 1993 | Daniel Crevier | AI: The Tumultuous History of the Search for Artificial Intelligence | Finalist | |
| 1993 | Gary Taubes | Bad Science: The Short Life and Weird Times of Cold Fusion | Finalist | |
| 1993 | James Gleick | Genius: The Life and Science of Richard Feynman | Finalist | |
| 1993 | Edward O. Wilson | The Diversity of Life | Finalist | |
| 1994 | Jonathan Weiner | The Beak of the Finch: A Story Of Evolution In Our Time | Winner | |
| 1994 | Robert Pollack | Signs of Life: The Language and Meanings of DNA | Finalist | |
| 1994 | Peter Ward | The End of Evolution | Finalist | |
| 1994 | Alan Cromer | Uncommon Sense: The Heretical Nature of Science | Finalist | |
| 1994 | Robert M. Sapolsky | Why Zebras Don’t Get Ulcers | Finalist | |
| 1995 | Edward O. Wilson | Naturalist | Winner | |
| 1995 | Oliver Sacks | An Anthropologist on Mars: Seven Paradoxical Tales | Finalist | |
| 1995 | Antonio R. Damasio | Descartes’ Error: Emotion, Reason, and the Human Brain | Finalist | |
| 1995 | Ken Croswell | The Alchemy of the Heavens: Searching for Meaning in the Milky Way | Finalist | |
| 1995 | Robert Wright | The Moral Animal: Why We Are the Way We Are -- The New Science of Evolutionary Psychology | Finalist | |
| 1996 | Carl Sagan | The Demon-Haunted World: Science as a Candle in the Dark | Winner | |
| 1996 | Amir D. Aczel | Fermat’s Last Theorem: Unlocking the Secret of an Ancient Mathematical Problem | Finalist | |
| 1996 | George Johnson | Fire in the Mind: Science, Faith, and the Search for Order | Finalist | |
| 1996 | James Howard Kunstler | Home from Nowhere: Remaking Our Everyday World for the 21st Century | Finalist | |
| 1996 | Charles E. Little | The Dying of the Trees | Finalist | |
| 1996 | Stephen L. Buchmann and Gary Paul Nabhan | The Forgotten Pollinators | Finalist | |
| 1996 | Hugh Aldersey-Williams | The Most Beautiful Molecule: The Discovery of the Buckyball | Finalist | |
| 1997 | Steven Pinker | How the Mind Works | Winner | |
| 1997 | Richard Rhodes | Deadly Feasts: Tracking the Secrets of a Terrifying New Plague | Finalist | |
| 1997 | David Deutsch | The Fabric of Reality: The Science of Parallel Universes and Its Implications | Finalist | |
| 1997 | Robert M. Sapolsky | The Trouble With Testosterone And Other Essays On The Biology Of The Human Predicament | Finalist | |
| 1997 | David Harry Grinspoon | Venus Revealed: A New Look Below the Clouds of Our Mysterious Twin Planet | Finalist | |
| 1998 | Douglas Starr | Blood: An Epic History of Medicine and Commerce | Winner | |
| 1998 | Simon Mawer | Mendel’s Dwarf | Finalist | |
| 1998 | V. S. Ramachandran and Sandra Blakeslee | Phantoms in the Brain: Probing the Mysteries of the Human Mind | Finalist | |
| 1998 | Pat Shipman | Taking Wing: Archaeopteryx and the Evolution of Bird Flight | Finalist | |
| 1998 | Daniel J. Kevles | The Baltimore Case: A Trial of Politics, Science, and Character | Finalist | |
| 1999 | Dava Sobel | Galileo's Daughter: A Historical Memoir of Science, Faith and Love | Winner | |
| 1999 | Alison Jolly | Lucy’s Legacy: Sex and Intelligence in Human Evolution | Finalist | |
| 1999 | Bernd Heinrich | Mind of the Raven: Investigations and Adventures With Wolf-Birds | Finalist | |
| 1999 | Simon Singh | The Code Book: The Science of Secrecy from Ancient Egypt to Quantum Cryptography | Finalist | |
| 1999 | Edward Hooper | The River: A Journey to the Source of HIV and AIDS | Finalist | |
| 2000 | James Le Fanu, M.D. | The Rise and Fall of Modern Medicine | Winner | |
| 2000 | Karl Sabbagh | A Rum Affair: A True Story of Botanical Fraud | Finalist | |
| 2000 | David Bodanis | E = mc2: A Biography of the World’s Most Famous Equation | Finalist | |
| 2000 | Dennis Overbye | Einstein in Love: A Scientific Romance | Finalist | |
| 2000 | Matt Ridley | Genome: The Autobiography of a Species in 23 Chapters | Finalist | |
| 2001 | Richard Hamblyn | The Invention of Clouds: How an Amateur Meteorologist Forged the Language of the Skies | Winner | |
| 2001 | David Hancocks | A Different Nature: The Paradoxical World of Zoos and Their Uncertain Future | Finalist | |
| 2001 | Sarah Flannery and David Flannery | In Code: A Mathematical Journey | Finalist | |
| 2001 | Bryan Sykes | The Seven Daughters of Eve: The Science That Reveals Our Genetic Ancestry | Finalist | |
| 2001 | Oliver Sacks | Uncle Tungsten: Memories of a Chemical Boyhood | Finalist | |
| 2002 | Brenda Maddox | Rosalind Franklin: The Dark Lady of DNA | Winner | |
| 2002 | Deborah Blum | Love at Goon Park: Harry Harlow and the Science of Affection | Finalist | |
| 2002 | Judith Hooper | Of Moths and Men: An Evolutionary Tale | Finalist | |
| 2002 | Mark Kurlansky | Salt: A World History | Finalist | |
| 2002 | Richard Preston | The Demon in the Freezer: A True Story | Finalist | |
| 2003 | Philip J. Hilts | Protecting America’s Health: The FDA, Business, and One Hundred Years of Regulation | Winner | |
| 2003 | Stephen S. Hall | Merchants of Immortality: Chasing the Dream of Human Life Extension | Finalist | |
| 2003 | David Baron | The Beast in the Garden: A Modern Parable of Man and Nature | Finalist | |
| 2003 | Chandler Burr | The Emperor of Scent: A Story of Perfume, Obsession, and the Last Mystery of the Senses | Finalist | |
| 2003 | Paul Hoffman | Wings of Madness: Alberto Santos-Dumont and the Invention of Flight | Finalist | |
| 2004 | Charles Wohlforth | The Whale and the Supercomputer: On the Northern Front of Climate Change | Winner | |
| 2004 | Jonathan Weiner | His Brother’s Keeper: A Story from the Edge of Medicine | Finalist | |
| 2004 | Alan Tennant | On the Wing: To the Edge of the Earth with the Peregrine Falcon | Finalist | |
| 2004 | Lauren Slater | Opening Skinner's Box: Great Psychological Experiments of the Twentieth Century | Finalist | |
| 2004 | Ann Parson | The Proteus Effect: Stem Cells and Their Promise for Medicine | Finalist | |
| 2005 | Diana Preston | Before the Fallout: From Marie Curie to Hiroshima | Winner | |
| 2005 | Brad Matsen | Descent: The Heroic Discovery of the Abyss | Finalist | |
| 2005 | Sean B. Carroll | Endless Forms Most Beautiful: The New Science of Evo Devo | Finalist | |
| 2005 | Mariana Gosnell | Ice: The Nature, the History, and the Uses of an Astonishing Substance | Finalist | |
| 2005 | Chris Mooney | The Republican War on Science | Finalist | |
| 2006 | Eric R. Kandel | In Search of Memory: The Emergence of a New Science of Mind | Winner | |
| 2006 | Edward O. Wilson | The Creation: An Appeal to Save Life on Earth | Finalist | |
| 2006 | Ann Gibbons | The First Human: The Race to Discover Our Earliest Ancestors | Finalist | |
| 2006 | Joyce Chaplin | The First Scientific American: Benjamin Franklin and the Pursuit of Genius | Finalist | |
| 2006 | Daniel J. Levitin | This Is Your Brain on Music: The Science of a Human Obsession | Finalist | |
| 2007 | Douglas Hofstadter | I Am a Strange Loop | Winner | |
| 2007 | James L. Gould and Carol Grant Gould | Architects: Building and the Evolution of Intelligence | Finalist | |
| 2007 | Gino Segrè | Faust in Copenhagen: A Struggle for the Soul of Physics | Finalist | |
| 2007 | Daniel Lord Smail | On Deep History and the Brain | Finalist | |
| 2007 | Christine Kenneally | The First Word: The Search for the Origins of Language | Finalist | |
| 2008 | Leonard Susskind | The Black Hole War: My Battle with Stephen Hawking to Make the World Safe for Quantum Mechanics | Winner | |
| 2008 | Carl Zimmer | Microcosm: E.Coli and the New Science of Life | Finalist | |
| 2008 | Kenneth R. Miller | Only a Theory: Evolution and the Battle for America’s Soul | Finalist | |
| 2008 | Avery Gilbert | What the Nose Knows: The Science of Scent in Everyday Life | Finalist | |
| 2008 | Martin J. S. Rudwick | Worlds Before Adam: The Reconstruction of Geohistory in the Age of Reform | Finalist | |
| 2009 | Graham Farmelo | The Strangest Man: The Hidden Life of Paul Dirac, Mystic of the Atom | Winner | |
| 2009 | Richard Wrangham | Catching Fire: How Cooking Made Us Human | Finalist | |
| 2009 | Bill Streever | Cold: Adventures in the World’s Frozen Places | Finalist | |
| 2009 | Carol Kaesuk Yoon | Naming Nature: The Clash Between Instinct and Science | Finalist | |
| 2009 | Marcia Bartusiak | The Day We Found the Universe | Finalist | |
| 2010 | Oren Harman | The Price of Altruism: George Price and the Search for the Origins of Kindness | Winner | |
| 2010 | Naomi Oreskes and Erik M. Conway | Merchants of Doubt: How a Handful of Scientists Obscured the Truth on Issues from Tobacco Smoke to Global Warming | Finalist | |
| 2010 | Lauren Redniss | Radioactive: Marie & Pierre Curie: A Tale of Love and Fallout | Finalist | |
| 2010 | Siddhartha Mukherjee | The Emperor of All Maladies: A Biography of Cancer | Finalist | |
| 2010 | Rebecca Skloot | The Immortal Life of Henrietta Lacks | Finalist | |
| 2011 | Sylvia Nasar | Grand Pursuit: The Story of Economic Genius | Winner | |
| 2011 | Joel Achenbach | A Hole at the Bottom of the Sea: The Race to Kill the BP Oil Gusher | Finalist | |
| 2011 | Holly Tucker | Blood Work: A Tale of Medicine and Murder in the Scientific Revolution | Finalist | |
| 2011 | James Gleick | The Information: A History, a Theory, a Flood | Finalist | |
| 2011 | Mara Hvistendahl | Unnatural Selection: Choosing Boys Over Girls, and the Consequences of a World Full of Men | Finalist | |
| 2012 | Florence Williams | Breasts: A Natural and Unnatural History | Winner | |
| 2012 | Susan Cain | Quiet: The Power of Introverts in a World That Can’t Stop Talking | Finalist | |
| 2012 | Nate Silver | The Signal and the Noise: Why So Many Predictions Fail—but Some Don’t | Finalist | |
| 2012 | Jonathan Gottschall | The Storytelling Animal: How Stories Make Us Human | Finalist | |
| 2012 | George Dyson | Turing’s Cathedral: The Origins of the Digital Universe | Finalist | |
| 2013 | Alan Weisman | Countdown: Our Last, Best Hope for a Future on Earth? | Winner | |
| 2013 | Virginia Morell | Animal Wise: The Thoughts and Emotions of Our Fellow Creatures | Finalist | |
| 2013 | Sally Satel and Scott O. Lilienfeld | Brainwashed: The Seductive Appeal of Mindless Neuroscience | Finalist | |
| 2013 | Annalee Newitz | Scatter, Adapt, and Remember: How Humans Will Survive a Mass Extinction | Finalist | |
| 2013 | Matthew D. Lieberman | Social: Why Our Brains are Wired to Connect | Finalist | |
| 2014 | Elizabeth Kolbert | The Sixth Extinction: An Unnatural History | Winner | |
| 2014 | Michael Benson | Cosmigraphics: Picturing Space Through Time | Finalist | |
| 2014 | Christian Rudder | Dataclysm: Who We Are (When We Think No One’s Looking) | Finalist | |
| 2014 | Martin J. Blaser | MD, Missing Microbes, How the overuse of antibiotics is fueling our modern plagues | Finalist | |
| 2014 | Naomi Klein | This Changes Everything: Capitalism vs. The Climate | Finalist | |
| 2015 | Andrea Wulf | The Invention of Nature: Alexander von Humboldt's New World | Winner | |
| 2015 | Beth Shapiro | How to Clone a Mammoth: The Science of De-Extinction | Finalist | |
| 2015 | John Markoff | Machines of Loving Grace: The Quest for Common Ground Between Humans and Robots | Finalist | |
| 2015 | Jonathan Waldman | Rust: The Longest War | Finalist | |
| 2015 | David J. Morris | The Evil Hours: A Biography of Post-Traumatic Stress Disorder | Finalist | |
| 2016 | Luke Dittrich | Patient H.M.: A Story of Memory, Madness, and Family Secrets | Winner | |
| 2016 | Mary Roach | Grunt: The Curious Science of Humans at War | Finalist | |
| 2016 | Ed Yong | I Contain Multitudes: The Microbes Within Us and a Grander View of Life | Finalist | |
| 2016 | Bruce Watson | Light: A Radiant History from Creation to the Quantum Age | Finalist | |
| 2016 | Sonia Shah | Pandemic: Tracking Contagions, from Cholera to Ebola and Beyond | Finalist | |
| 2017 | Robert Sapolsky | Behave: The Biology of Humans at Our Best and Worst | Winner | |
| 2017 | Jennifer A. Doudna and Samuel H. Sternberg | A Crack in Creation: Gene Editing and the Unthinkable Power to Control Evolution | Finalist | |
| 2017 | Max Tegmark | Life 3.0: Being Human in the Age of Artificial Intelligence | Finalist | |
| 2017 | Cornelia Dean | Making Sense of Science: Separating Substance from Spin | Finalist | |
| 2017 | Matthew Walker | Why We Sleep: Unlocking the Power of Sleep and Dreams | Finalist | |
| 2018 | Beth Macy | Dopesick: Dealers, Doctors, and the Drug Company That Addicted America | Winner | |
| 2018 | Eliza Griswold | Amity and Prosperity: One Family and the Fracturing of America | Finalist | |
| 2018 | Rose George | Nine Pints: A Journey Through the Money, Medicine, and Mysteries of Blood | Finalist | |
| 2018 | Marcia Bjornerud | Timefulness: How Thinking Like a Geologist Can Help Save the World | Finalist | |
| 2018 | Mona Hanna-Attisha | What the Eyes Don’t See: A Story of Crisis, Resistance, and Hope in an American City | Finalist | |
| 2019 | Maria Popova | Figuring | Winner | |
| 2019 | Katherine Eban | Bottle of Lies: the Inside Story of the Generic Drug Boom | Finalist | |
| 2019 | Adam Higginbotham | Midnight in Chernobyl: The Untold Story of the World's Greatest Nuclear Disaster | Finalist | |
| 2019 | Caroline Criado Perez | Invisible Women: Exposing Data Bias in a World Designed for Men | Finalist | |
| 2019 | Angela Saini | Superior: The Return of Race Science | Finalist | |
| 2020 | Sara Seager | The Smallest Lights in the Universe | Winner | |
| 2020 | Ainissa Ramirez | The Alchemy of Us: How Humans and Matter Transformed One Another | Finalist | |
| 2020 | Brian Christian | The Alignment Problem: Machine Learning and Human Values | Finalist | |
| 2020 | Lulu Miller | Why Fish Don’t Exist: A Story of Loss, Love, and the Hidden Order of Life | Finalist | |
| 2020 | Patrik Svensson | The Book of Eels: Our Enduring Fascination with the Most Mysterious Creature in the Natural World | Finalist | |
| 2021 | Dr. Chanda Prescod-Weinstein | The Disordered Cosmos: A Journey into Dark Matter, Spacetime, and Dreams Deferred | Winner | |
| 2021 | Katharine Hayhoe | Saving Us: A Climate Scientist's Case for Hope and Healing in a Divided World | Finalist | |
| 2021 | Emma Marris | Wild Souls: Freedom and Flourishing in the Non-Human World | Finalist | |
| 2021 | Meghan O'Gieblyn | God, Human, Animal, Machine: Technology, Metaphor, and the Search for Meaning | Finalist | |
| 2021 | Scott Weidensaul | A World on the Wing: The Global Odyssey of Migratory Birds | Finalist | |
| 2022 | Sabrina Imbler | How Far the Light Reaches: A Life in Ten Sea Creatures | Winner | |
| 2022 | Jessica Hernandez | Fresh Banana Leaves: Healing Indigenous Landscapes Through Indigenous Science | Finalist | |
| 2022 | Juli Berwald | Life on the Rocks: Building a Future for Coral Reefs | Finalist | |
| 2022 | James Vincent | Beyond Measure: The Hidden History of Measurement From Cubits to Quantum Constants | Finalist | |
| 2022 | Ed Yong | An Immense World: How Animal Senses Reveal the Hidden Realms Around Us | Finalist | |
| 2023 | Eugenia Cheng | Is Math Real? How Simple Questions Lead Us to Mathematics’ Deepest Truths | Winner | |
| 2023 | Jeff Goodell | The Heat Will Kill You First: Life and Death on a Scorched Planet | Finalist | |
| 2023 | Jaime Green | The Possibility of Life: Science, Imagination, and Our Quest for Kinship in the Cosmos | Finalist | |
| 2023 | Caspar Henderson | A Book of Noises: Notes on the Auraculous | Finalist | |
| 2023 | Zach Weinersmith and Kelly Weinersmith | A City on Mars: Can We Settle Space, Should We Settle Space, and Have We Really Thought This Through? | Finalist | |
