= Guest Privileges =

2025 nonfiction book by Gaar Adams

- First edition cover
- Author: Gaar Adams
- Language: English
- Publisher: Dzanc Books
- Publication date: September 17, 2025
- Publication place: United States
- Pages: 302
- Award: Lambda Literary Award for Nonfiction (2026)
- ISBN: 978-1-938-60330-3

Guest Privileges: Queer Lives and Finding Home in the Middle East is a 2025 nonfiction book by American writer Gaar Adams. Guest Privileges won the 2026 Lambda Literary Award for Nonfiction.

== Contents ==
Guest Privileges explores Adam's experiences as a gay American expatriate living in the United Arab Emirates for a decade.

After receiving a degree in history from New York University, Adams moved to the UAE to study cultural traditions. Because of his sexual orientation, he ended up learning more about queer culture in the UAE, where homosexuality is criminalized. Throughout the book, Adams explores why queer people would choose to immigrate to inhospitable regions, such as Gulf countries. After ultimately focusing his research on this population, Adams discovered an clandestine, yet flourishing queer community.

== Reception ==
Guest Privileges was well received by critics, including a starred review from Kirkus Reviews, who stated that the book provides "a striking cross section of an imperiled queer community that calls the Persian Gulf home".

Multiple reviewers discussed how Adams approached the subject. Brian Tanguay, writing for The Santa Barbara Independent, praised Adams for "writing with remarkable candor and honesty", while noting how Adams describes "the act [of cruising] is expressly political, a statement of his existence as a queer person". With that in mind, Maya Williams, writing for The Rumpus, commended Adams for his attention "to the difference between queer racialized people and queer white people–especially touring queer white men–making space for themselves in the Gulf".

The Middle East Centre's Ammar Azzouz called the stories "unforgettable and remarkable", while praising Adam's "excellent writing style", stating, "He is sensitive to the details, able as an artist to transfer the reader into the scene through colours, sounds, smell, movements, touches and emotions."

The Gay & Lesbian Review's Anne Charles overall appreciated the book but noted that the diverse topics and stories could have been more coherent: "With topics ranging from the tension between geographical stasis and mobility, issues of gender fluidity, the interaction between law and custom, definitions of home, et al., this is a book that sprawls; a good editor would have been helpful, but seems to be absent here."

Awards for Guest Privileges
Year	Award	Result	Ref.
2025	Foreword Indies Award for LGBTQ+	Silver Medal	
2025	Norbert Blei/August Derleth Nonfiction Book Award	Honorable mention	
2025	Ondaatje Prize	Longlist	
2026	Lambda Literary Award for Nonfiction	Winner	
