= Jim Elledge =

American author and editor (born 1950)

- Born: 1950 (age 75–76); Granite City, Illinois, USA
- Awards: Lambda Literary Award for Gay Poetry (2007); Lambda Literary Award for Anthology (2013)

Academic background
- Education: Eastern Illinois University (BA, 1971; MS, 1973); University of Illinois Chicago (PhD, 1986)

James Elledge (born 1950) is an American author, editor, and poet. As of 2026, he has authored six book-length biographies and ten poetry collections, as well as edited six collections. His works include Sweet Nothings (1994), A History of My Tattoo (2006), Who's Yer Daddy? (2012), Henry Darger, Throwaway Boy (2013), The Boys of Fairy Town (2018), and An Angel in Sodom (2022). Among other honors, Elledge won the 2007 Lambda Literary Award for Gay Poetry and the 2014 Lambda Literary Award for Anthology.

== Early life and education ==
Elledge was born in 1950 in Granite City, Illinois. He attended Eastern Illinois University, from which he earned a Bachelor of Arts in English in 1971 and a Master of Science in library science in 1973. In 1986, Elledge earned a Doctor of Philosophy in English with a specialization in creative writing from the University of Illinois Chicago.

== Career ==
Elledge started his academic career as a reference librarian at Mundelein College, then worked as the assistant medical librarian at the Columbus-Cuneo-Cabrini Medical Center. After earning his doctorate in 1986, Elledge taught English at Illinois State University, then joined Kennesaw State University in 2006. While there, he taught poetry and specialized in creative writing and queer studies, eventually becoming the director of the university's Master of Arts Professional Writing program. He retired in 2016.

Elledge published his first book, James Dickey: A Bibliography, 1947-1974, a biography of American poet and novelist James Dickey (1923–1997), with Scarecrow Press in 1979. He has since published multiple biographies and poetry collections, as well as edited several anthologies.

From 1983 to 1988, Elledge was the assistant editor of Poetry, later working as an assistant editor with Illinois Writers Review, as well as a book review editor with Pikestaff Forum.

== Select publications ==
=== Sweet Nothings (1994) ===
Sweet Nothings: An Anthology of Rock and Roll in American Poetry is an anthology published by Indiana University Press in 1994. With 125 poems from 79 writers, the collection explores the connection between rock and roll music and poetry among the Baby Boomer poets in the United States. Among others, the collection includes work from Frank O'Hara, Joyce Carol Oates, David Wojahn, Thom Gunn, Rita Dove, Lynda Hull, Albert Goldbarth, Lisel Mueller, Yusef Komunyakaa, Gary Soto, and William Matthews.

According to Publishers Weekly, Sweet Nothings "is intriguing less for the general sociohistorical reasons noted than because it harbors an underlying current of sadness and loss". They argue that while the writing is strong, "the poetry rarely conveys the power of the music that so influenced them". Similarly, Popular Music's Thomas Swiss wrote that while "there are some terrific poems in Sweet Nothings; there are also many that reinforce the usual cliches about rock, especially sixties rock and its supposed counter-cultural purity and powers."

=== A History of My Tattoo (2006) ===
A History of My Tattoo is a poetry collection published by Brickhouse Books in 2006. The collection provides "a completely fictionalized book-length poem" that "tells the story(ies) of a life close to his own. but not quite his own: the best of all possible poetry scenarios, keeping the reader intrigued and guessing". Maureen Seaton, writing for Lambda Book Report, described the collection as "gorgeous and disturbing" as poems "repeat and organize the longer narrative".

A History of My Tattoo won the 2007 Lambda Literary Award for Gay Poetry, and was a finalist for the 2007 Thom Gunn Award.

=== Who's Yer Daddy? (2012) ===
Who's Yer Daddy?: Gay Writers Celebrate Their Mentors And Forerunners, co-edited by David Groff, is an anthology published by the University of Wisconsin Press in 2012. The anthology includes 39 pieces that focus on gay, male authors who mentored and inspired the anthology's authors. Authors include Mark Doty, Richard Blanco, Justin Chin, Rigoberto González, Richard McCann, and Michael Klein.

Writing for Library Journal, Richard J. Violette noted that the subjects discussed in Who's Yer Daddy? "are not all literary figures, and of those many are neither gay nor male; dip in and you're as likely to come up with Captain Kirk or Bette Midler as Walt Whitman". Overall, Violette found that "the quality of the pieces varies, but most are literate, insightful, and self aware".

Who's Yer Daddy? won the 2014 Lambda Literary Award for Anthology.

=== Henry Darger, Throwaway Boy (2013) ===
Henry Darger, Throwaway Boy: The Tragic Life of an Outsider Artist is a biography of American artist and writer Henry Darger (1892–1973), published by Overlook Press in 2013. The account takes a questioning look at the life of Henry Darger, a reclusive dishwasher whose writings and illustrations sparked controversy, particularly his drawings of young girls with male genitalia. While some have accused Darger of pedophilia and of potentially murdering a child, Elledge argues that Darger may have been the victim of sexual assault as a child, while also speculating about other arenas of Darger's life.

Although Henry Darger, Throwaway Boy is marketed as a biography, the book established that Elledge "'intentionally dramatized details of the events depicted in order to bring them to life for the reader,' to create scenes that are, 'by necessity, a literary reconstruction'". Reviewers were critical of the work in part because of these insertions. While Kirkus Reviews conceded that "Elledge has clearly conducted an impressive amount of research on Darger's milieu", they noted that "the author's assertions speculative at best", given Darger's lack of writing during specific periods of his life. They concluded that Elledge's "sociocultural agenda distorts a deeper understanding of the artist's oeuvre".

In 2014, Henry Darger, Throwaway Boy was a finalist for the Lambda Literary Award for Gay Memoir or Biography and Randy Shilts Award. The book also earned Elledge the Georgia Author of the Year Award for Biography.

=== The Boys of Fairy Town (2018) ===
The Boys of Fairy Town: Sodomites, Female Impersonators, Third-Sexers, Pansies, Queers, and Sex Morons in Chicago's First Century is a nonfiction book published by Chicago Review Press in 2018. The book provides queer history in Chicago, focusing on specific neighborhoods where gay people lived in the late 1830s to the mid-1940s. During this time, Elledge describes how queer and non-queer people openly interacted despite larger societal stigmas in what became known as the Pansy Craze, though this was negatively impacted by the Great Depression. Subjects of focus include gay rights' activist Henry Gerber, American scientist and sexologist Alfred Kinsey, the Dill Pickle Club, Bughouse Square, and the Fine Arts Building.

In a starred review, Booklist's June Sawyers described The Boys of Fairy Town as "a thoroughly researched, invaluable, and vastly entertaining tale of lost Chicago". Sawyers highlighted the book's "striking cover" and "provocative subtitle", alongside the book's content, which Sawyer described as providing "an eye-popping portrait of the inhabitants of Towertown, Bronzeville, West Madison Street, and other bohemian neighborhoods".

In 2018, the Chicago Writers Association gave The Boys of Fairy Town an honorable mention for "Traditional Nonfiction Book of the Year". The following year, it was a finalist for the Lambda Literary Award for Nonfiction.

=== An Angel in Sodom (2022) ===
An Angel in Sodom: Henry Gerber and the Birth of the Gay Rights Movement is a biography published by Chicago Review Press in 2022. It was a finalist for the 2022 Lambda Literary Award for Gay Memoir or Biography.

== Awards ==
Awards for Elledge's work
Year	Title		Award	Result	Ref.
2007	A History of My Tattoo	Lambda Literary Awards	Gay Poetry	Winner	
2007	A History of My Tattoo	Publishing Triangle	Thom Gunn Award	Finalist	
2014	Henry Darger, Throwaway Boy	Georgia Author of the Year Award	Biography	Winner	
2014	Henry Darger, Throwaway Boy	Lambda Literary Awards	Gay Memoir or Biography	Finalist	
2014	Henry Darger, Throwaway Boy	Publishing Triangle	Randy Shilts Award	Finalist	
2014	Who's Yer Daddy?	Lambda Literary Awards	Anthology	Winner	
2018	The Boys of Fairy Town	Chicago Writers Association	Traditional Nonfiction Book of the Year	Honorable Mention	
2019	The Boys of Fairy Town	Lambda Literary Awards	Nonfiction	Finalist	
2022	An Angel in Sodom	Lambda Literary Awards	Gay Memoir or Biography	Finalist	

== Publications ==
=== As author ===
==== Biography and nonfiction ====
- Elledge, Jim (1979). James Dickey: A Bibliography, 1947-1974. Metuchen: Scarecrow Press. ISBN 978-0-8108-1218-5.
- Elledge, Jim (1985). Weldon Kees: A Critical Introduction. Scarecrow Press. ISBN 978-0-810-81830-9.
- Elledge, Jim (1990). Frank O'Hara: To Be True to a City. University of Michigan Press. ISBN 978-0-472-09408-0.
- Elledge, Jim (2013). Henry Darger, Throwaway Boy: The Tragic Life of an Outsider Artist. New York: Overlook Press. doi:10.2979/Masquerade. ISBN 978-1-590-20855-7.
- Elledge, Jim (2018). The Boys of Fairy Town: Sodomites, Female Impersonators, Third-Sexers, Pansies, Queers, and Sex Morons in Chicago's First Century. Chicago: Chicago Review Press. ISBN 978-1-613-73935-8.
- Elledge, Jim (2022). An Angel in Sodom: Henry Gerber and the Birth of the Gay Rights Movement. Chicago Review Press. ISBN 978-1-641-60605-9.

==== Poetry ====
- Elledge, Jim (1989). Various Envies. Copper Beech Press. ISBN 978-0-914-27851-1.
- Elledge, Jim (1994). Earth As It Is. Ashland Poetry Press. ISBN 978-0-912-59238-1.
- Elledge, Jim (1995). Into the Arms of the Universe. Brickhouse Books. ISBN 978-0-932-61651-7.
- Elledge, Jim (2000). Four Chapters of Coming Forth by Day. Red Barn Press. ISBN 978-0-932-61680-7.
- Elledge, Jim (2006). A History of My Tattoo. Brickhouse Books. ISBN 978-0-932-61680-7.
- Elledge, Jim (2008). The Book of the Heart Taken by Love. Five Fingers Press.
- Elledge, Jim (2012). H. New York: Lethe Press. ISBN 978-1-590-21250-9.
- Elledge, Jim (2015). Tapping My Arm for a Vein. New York: Lethe Press. ISBN 978-1-590-21444-2.
- Elledge, Jim (2017). Bonfire of the Sodomites. Main Street Rag. ISBN 978-1-599-48622-2.
- Elledge, Jim (2019). Nothing Nice. Seven Kitchens Press. ISBN 978-1-949-33344-2.

=== As editor ===
- Elledge, Jim; Swartwout, Susan, eds. (1999). Real Things: An Anthology of Popular Culture in American Poetry. Bloomington: Indiana University Press. ISBN 978-0-253-33434-3.
- Elledge, Jim, ed. (1994). Sweet Nothings: An Anthology of Rock and Roll in American Poetry. Indiana University Press. ISBN 978-0-253-20864-4.
- Elledge, ed. (2002). Gay, Lesbian, Bisexual, and Transgender Myths from the Arapaho to the Zuñi: An Anthology (Jim ed.). Peter Lang. ISBN 978-0-820-45286-9.
- Elledge, Jim, ed. (2004). Masquerade: Queer Poetry in America to the End of World War II. Bloomington: Indiana University Press. ISBN 978-0-253-21634-2.
- Elledge, Jim, ed. (2010). Queers in American Popular Culture. Bloomington: Praeger. ISBN 978-0-313-35457-1.
- Elledge, Jim; Groff, David, eds. (2012). Who's Yer Daddy?: Gay Writers Celebrate Their Mentors And Forerunners. University of Wisconsin Press. ISBN 978-0-299-28940-9.
