= Hugh Ryan =

American historian

- Occupations: Historian; writer
- Writing career
- Subject: LGBTQ history of New York City
- Notable awards: Stonewall Book Award (2023)
- Website: hughryan.org

Hugh Ryan is an American historian and non-fiction writer focusing on the LGBTQ history of New York City. He wrote The Women's House of Detention: A Queer History of a Forgotten Prison and When Brooklyn Was Queer.

== Education ==
Ryan attended Cornell University and received an MFA degree from Bennington College.

== Career ==
When Brooklyn Was Queer (2019) focuses on the LGBTQ history of Brooklyn's waterfront. The book was a 2019 New York Times Editor's Choice and one of Harper's Bazaar's Best LGBTQ books of 2019. It was a finalist for the 2020 Lambda Literary Award for Nonfiction. In 2024, it was announced that Elliot Page would be an executive producer for a virtual reality-based series adapting the book, directed by Yasmin Elayat and written by Agnes Borinsky.

The Women's House of Detention (2022) focuses on the queer women and transmasculine people who were systematically imprisoned in the New York Women's House of Detention. The book won the American Library Association's 2023 Stonewall Book Award for Non-fiction and Publishers Weekly called it "a vital contribution to LGBTQ history." Kirkus Reviews called it a "blistering critique of the country’s ‘criminal legal system’.”

In 2026, he released a memoir in essays entitled My Bad: A Personal History of the Queer Nineties and Beyond.

He teaches nonfiction writing at Bennington College. He is a contributor to the Los Angeles Review of Books.
