= Marcia Bjornerud =

American structural geologist

Marcia Bjornerud (1962) is an American structural geologist and writer. She is the Walter Schober Professor of Environmental Studies and Professor of Geosciences at Lawrence University. She is a contributing writer to Elements, the science and technology blog of The New Yorker.

Her book Timefulness was a finalist for the 2018 Los Angeles Times Book Prize for Science and Technology. She was awarded the John Burroughs Medal for nature writing in 2025, for her book Turning to Stone: Discovering the Subtle Wisdom of Rocks.

Marcia Bjornerud was born in 1962.

== Books ==
- Reading the Rocks: The Autobiography of the Earth (2005)
- Geopedia: A Brief Compendium of Geologic Curiosities (2022)
- Timefulness: How Thinking Like a Geologist Can Help Save the World (2018)
- Turning to Stone: Discovering the Subtle Wisdom of Rocks (2024)
