= Matt Baume =

American YouTuber

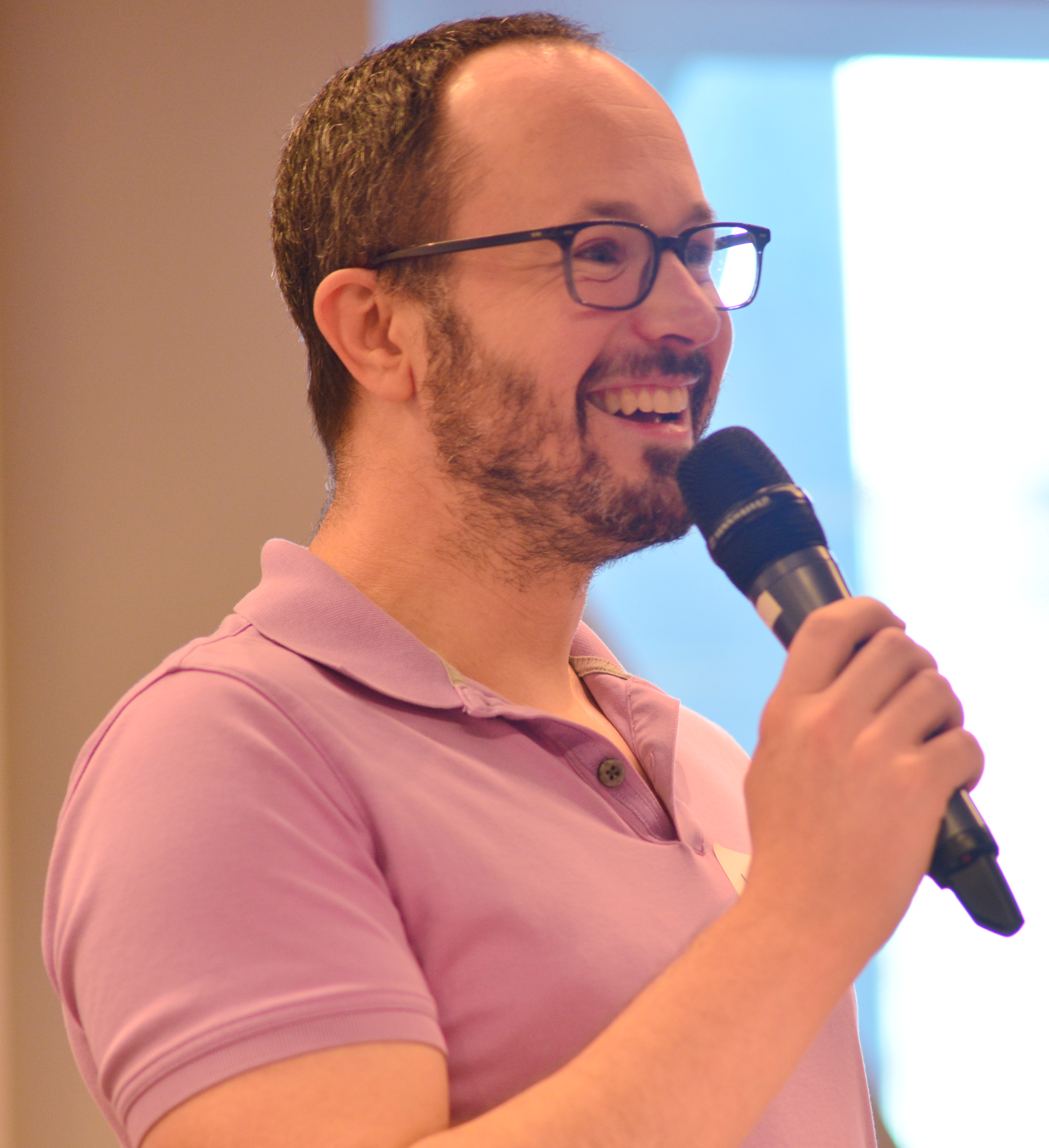
- Baume in 2023 presenting about his book: Hi Honey, I'm Homo!

YouTube information
- Channel: Matt Baume
- Years active: 2015–present
- Subscribers: 379 thousand
- Views: 50 million
- Last updated: August 16, 2026

Matt Baume is an American YouTuber, podcaster, and author who produces documentary-style videos on YouTube regarding media portrayal of LGBTQ people in his series Matt Baume's Culture Cruise.

Baume is the author of Hi Honey, I'm Homo!: Sitcoms, Specials and the Queering of American Culture, which won the 2024 Lambda Literary Award for LGBTQ+ Nonfiction and was one of the Stonewall Book Award Israel Fishman Non-Fiction Award 2024 Honor Books.
