= Sabrina Imbler =

American science writer (born 1994/95)

- Born: June 29, 1994 (age 32); San Francisco Bay Area, California, United States
- Education: Brown University
- Occupations: The New York Times fellow (2021–2022); Defector Media staff writer (since 2022)
- Writing career
- Genre: Science journalism
- Subject: Biology
- Notable work: How Far the Light Reaches (2022)
- Website: simbler.github.io

Sabrina Imbler (born June 29, 1994) is an American science journalist and essayist. They have written a chapbook titled Dyke (geology) (2020) and an essay collection titled How Far the Light Reaches: A Life in Ten Sea Creatures (2022). Their work discusses scientific topics such as marine biology, often combined with LGBTQ themes.

Imbler was born in the San Francisco Bay Area. After graduating from Brown University, they wrote for publications including Scientific American and Atlas Obscura. In 2020, they published Dyke (geology), a work of prose poetry describing geology and queer identity. They held a fellowship at The New York Times from 2021 to 2022, writing some headlines went viral. They joined Defector Media in 2022, covering science. How Far the Light Reaches, published in 2022, contains ten essays interweaving memoir with descriptions of marine animals.

== Early life and education ==
Sabrina Imbler was born in 1994 in the San Francisco Bay Area of California. Their mother immigrated from Taiwan as a child, and their father is White American. Growing up near the Pacific Ocean, Imbler developed an interest in marine life as a child. As a teenager, they protested a pet store for its treatment of fish. Imbler graduated from Brown University in 2016, majoring in creative nonfiction. They came out as queer while in college.

== Career ==
Imbler's first internship was for Scientific American. Their first writing job was as a product reviewer for Wirecutter. While working for Wirecutter, in 2018, they began writing a column for Catapult Magazine titled "My Life in Sea Creatures". Its first installment discussed Graneledone boreopacifica, a species of octopus that watches its eggs for four-and-a-half years, which Imbler related to their relationship with their mother. They were a staff writer for Atlas Obscura until June 2020. Their work was also published in The Atlantic, Audubon, and Sierra.

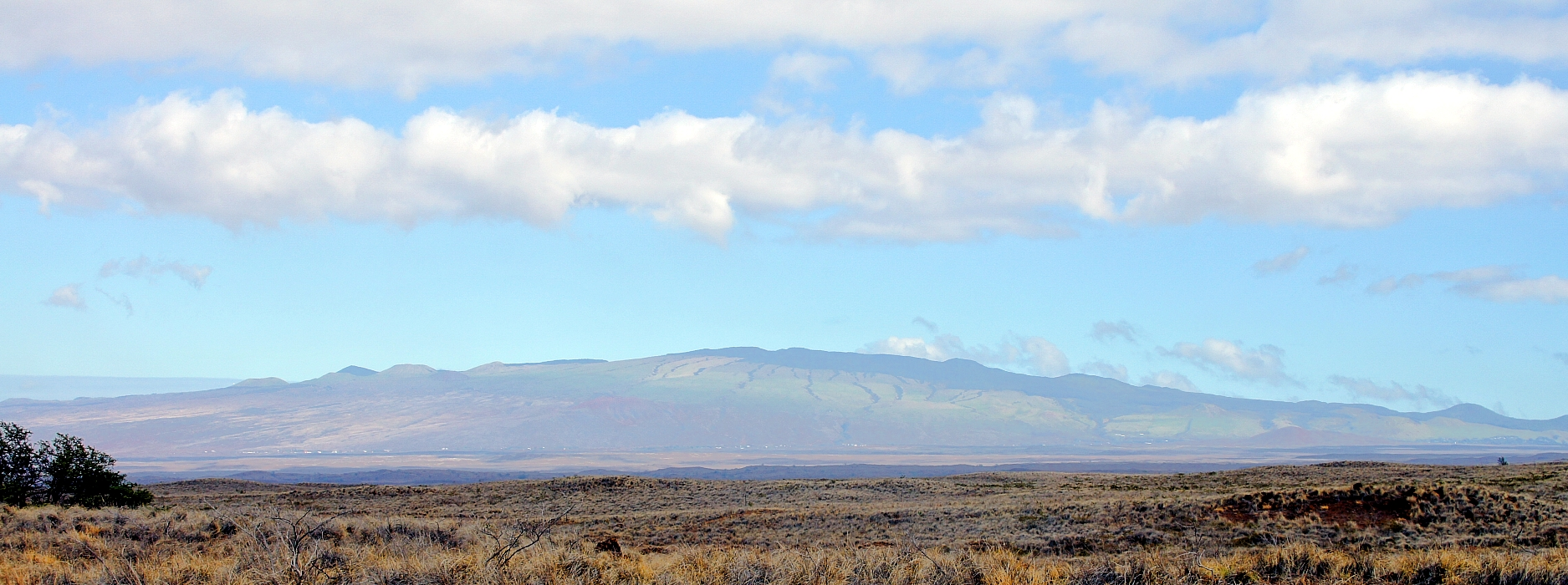
Dyke (geology) is partly about the extinct volcano Kohala.

Imbler's chapbook Dyke (geology), which originated as a college writing assignment, was published in 2020. It is a work of prose poetry, scientific writing, and autobiographical fiction, with themes of identity and sexuality. The book contains 7 chapters and fewer than 25 pages. Its narrative follows the Hawaiian extinct volcano Kohala as well as a breakup. It provides a queer interpretation of geology and uses bodily language to describe landforms.

Imbler joined The New York Times as a science reporting fellow in 2021. Two weeks later, they wrote an article for the publication titled, "When an Eel Climbs a Ramp to Eat Squid from a Clamp, That's a Moray". This headline, inspired by singer Dean Martin, was written by Imbler based on a concept by the Times's science editor, Michael Roston. The headline received praise on Twitter, and The Guardian listed the article among the "weirdest news stories of 2021". It was one of multiple New York Times headlines by Imbler to go viral. Their essay "The Unsung Heroine of Lichenology"—about the scientist Elke Mackenzie—was published in the 2021 volume of The Best American Science and Nature Writing. Their New York Times fellowship ended in 2022.

Imbler was hired by Defector Media in May 2022. They cover animals and other science topics for the publication, despite its primary focus on sports and politics. As Defector was a worker-owned publication, Imbler served on the company's culture committee. According to Nieman Lab's Michael Greshko, this was part of a trend of science writers turning toward writer-focused publications exemplified by Defector.

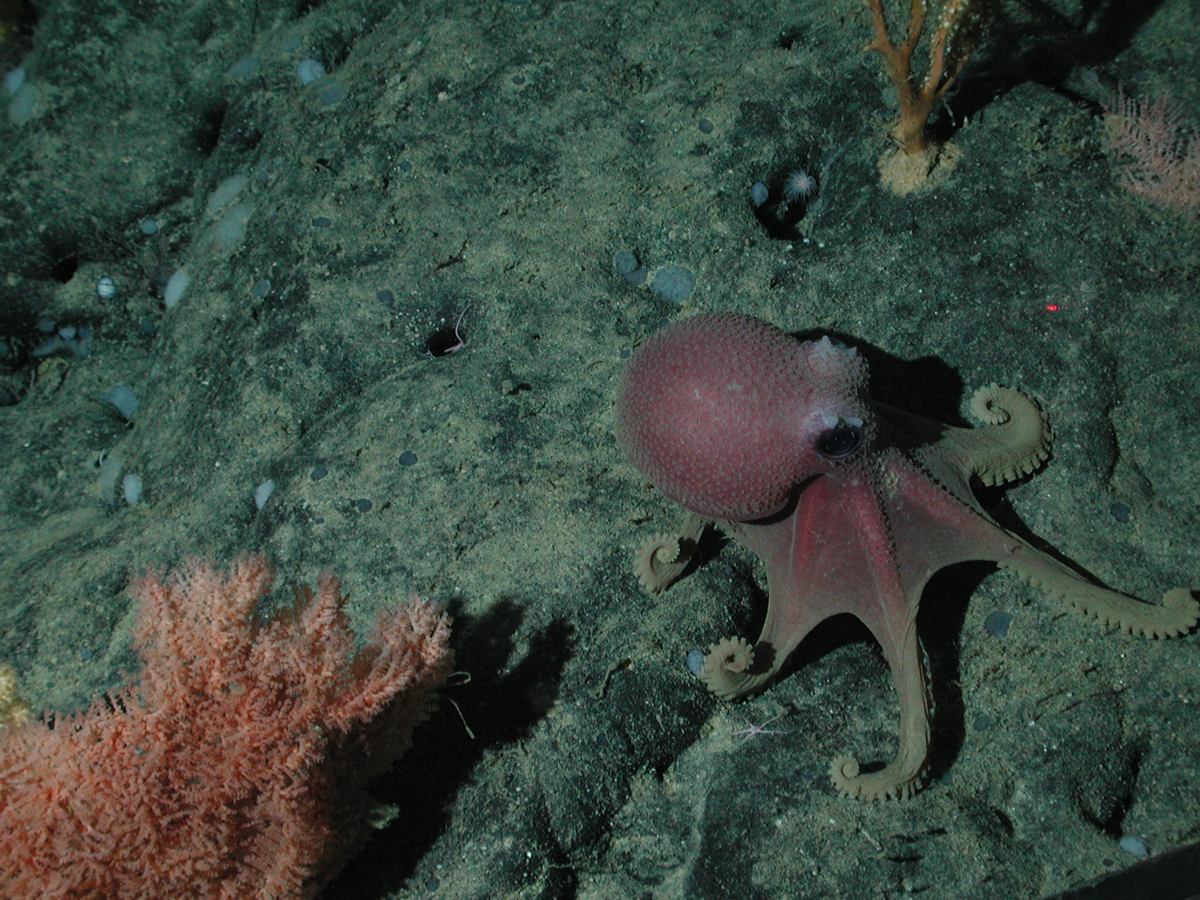
Graneledone boreopacifica, one of the ten animals described in How Far the Light Reaches

Imbler's second book, How Far the Light Reaches: A Life in Ten Sea Creatures, was published in 2022, based on their Catapult column. It is a collection of essays combining memoir with science writing. Each of its ten essays interweaves a description of a marine animal with a story from Imbler's life, drawing comparisons between these animals and Imbler's experiences as a queer, biracial writer. These include a goldfish barely surviving in a fish bowl, compared to Imbler's childhood; a Graneledone boreopacifica starving itself as it protects its eggs, compared to Imbler's relationship with their mother and eating disorder; and a group of yeti crabs thriving in the inhospitable environment of hydrothermal vents, compared to Imbler finding a queer community. The book received positive critical reception.

Imbler held a position as the science journalist in residence at the University of Wisconsin–Madison in 2023. They made a book deal with Random House in 2025 for a book titled Instar, about insect metamorphosis and Imbler's gender transition.

== Style ==
Imbler's journalistic niche, known as the "creatures beat", covers biology, particularly marine biology, using a literary style and references to Internet memes. Imbler's essays, including their work in The New York Times and How Far the Light Reaches, combine science journalism with LGBTQ narratives, either directly or indirectly. Autostraddle's Kayla Kumari Upadhyaya describes their prose as "lyrical, almost poetic".

== Awards ==
Year	Award	Category	Work	Result	Ref.
2023	Science + Literature Selected Titles (National Book Foundation and Alfred P. Sloan Foundation)	—N/a	Dyke (geology)	Won	
2024	Los Angeles Times Book Prize	Science and Technology	How Far the Light Reaches	Won	
2024	Lambda Literary Awards	Nonfiction	How Far the Light Reaches	Nominated	
