= Lambda Literary Award for Nonfiction =

American literary award

- Awarded for: LGBTQ+ Nonfiction Books
- Sponsored by: Lambda Literary Foundation
- Date: Annual
- Website: lambdaliterary.org/awards/

The Lambda Literary Award for Nonfiction is an annual literary award, presented by the Lambda Literary Foundation, that awards LGBT-themed nonfiction books whose intended audience is "general readers, as opposed to those targeted primarily to scholarly audiences." Anthologies and memoirs are not included as they have their own categories (i.e., Anthology, Gay Memoir, Lesbian Memoir, Bisexual Literature, and Transgender Literature).

== Recipients ==
Lambda Literary Award for Nonfiction winners and finalists
| Year | Contributor(s) | Title | Result | Ref. |
|---|---|---|---|---|
| 2006 | Thomas Glave | Words to Our Now | Winner | |
| 2006 | Keith Boykin | Beyond the Down Low | Finalist | |
| 2006 | Dennis Altman | Gore Vidal's America | Finalist | |
| 2006 | Peggy Drexler | Raising Boys without Men | Finalist | |
| 2006 | Tirza True Latimer | Women Together/Women Apart | Finalist | |
| 2007 | Lillian Faderman and Stuart Timmons | GAY L.A. | Winner | |
| 2007 | James T. Sears | Behind the Mask of the Mattachine | Finalist | |
| 2007 | Marcia Gallo | Different Daughters | Finalist | |
| 2007 | Kate Bornstein | Hello, Cruel World | Finalist | |
| 2007 | Brian Whitaker | Unspeakable Love | Finalist | |
| 2008 | Michael S. Sherry | Gay Artists in Modern American Culture | Winner | |
| 2008 | Sharon Marcus | Between Women | Finalist | |
| 2008 | David Valentine | Imagining Transgender | Finalist | |
| 2008 | Michael Rowe | Other Men's Sons | Finalist | |
| 2008 | Toni Mirosevich | Pink Harvest | Finalist | |
| 2009 | Jane Rule | Loving The Difficult | Winner | |
| 2009 | Nancy Polikoff | Beyond (Straight & Gay Marriage) | Finalist | |
| 2009 | William N. Eskridge, Jr. | Dishonorable Passions: Sodomy Laws in America 1861-2003 | Finalist | |
| 2009 | Kai Wright | Drifting Toward Love | Finalist | |
| 2009 | Michelle Cliff | If I Could Write This in Fire | Finalist | |
| 2009 | Nancy Agabian | Me as Her Again | Finalist | |
| 2010 | James Davidson | The Greeks and Greek Love | Winner | |
| 2010 | Rudolph P. Byrd, Johnnetta Betsch Cole, and Beverly Guy-Sheftall (Eds.) | I Am Your Sister: Collected and Unpublished Writings of Audre Lorde | Finalist | |
| 2010 | Drewey Wayne Gunn (Ed.) | The Golden Age of Gay Fiction | Finalist | |
| 2010 | Sarah Schulman | Ties That Bind: Familial Homophobia and Its Consequences | Finalist | |
| 2010 | Nathaniel Frank | Unfriendly Fire: How the Gay Ban Undermines the Military and Weakens America | Finalist | |
| 2011 | Virginie Despentes | King Kong Theory | Winner | |
| 2011 | Noach Dzmura (Ed.) | Balancing on the Mechitza: Transgender in Jewish Community | Finalist | |
| 2011 | Jallen Rix, Ed.D. | Ex-Gay No Way: Survival and Recovery from Sexual Abuse | Finalist | |
| 2011 | Emma Donoghue | Inseparable: Desire Between Women in Literature | Finalist | |
| 2011 | Stuart Biegel | The Right to Be Out: Sexual Orientation and Gender Identity in America's Public Schools | Finalist | |
| 2012 | Michael Bronski | A Queer History of the United States | Winner | |
| 2012 | Scott Pasfield | Gay in America: Portraits by Scott Pasfield | Finalist | |
| 2012 | Jay Michaelson | God vs. Gay?: The Religious Case for Equality | Finalist | |
| 2012 | Wanda M. Corn and Tirza True Latimer | Seeing Gertrude Stein: Five Stories | Finalist | |
| 2012 | Robert Duncan | The H.D. Book | Finalist | |
| 2013 | Dale Carpenter | Flagrant Conduct: The Story of Lawrence v. Texas | Winner | |
| 2013 | Stacy Braukman | Communists and Perverts under the Palms: The Johns Committee in Florida, 1956-1965 | Finalist | |
| 2013 | Christopher Bram | Eminent Outlaws: The Gay Writers Who Changed America | Finalist | |
| 2013 | Andrew Solomon | Far From The Tree: Parents, Children and the Search for Identity | Finalist | |
| 2013 | Michael G. Long (Ed.) | I Must Resist: Bayard Rustin's Life in Letters | Finalist | |
| 2013 | Sarah Schulman | Israel/Palestine and the Queer International | Finalist | |
| 2013 | Jeffrey Schwarz, Mark Thompson, and Bo Young | Out Spoken: A Vito Russo Reader Reel One and Reel Two | Finalist | |
| 2013 | T Cooper | Real Man Stories | Finalist | |
| 2014 | Hilton Als | White Girls | Winner | |
| 2014 | Scott Siraj al-Haqq Kugle | Living Out Islam: Voices of Gay, Lesbian, and Transgender Muslims | Finalist | |
| 2014 | Jamie Woo | Meet Grindr: How One App Changed The Way We Connect | Finalist | |
| 2014 | Phil Tiemeyer | Plane Queer: Labor, Sexuality, and AIDS in the History of Male Flight Attendants | Finalist | |
| 2014 | Daniel Winunwe Rivers | Radical Relations: Lesbian Mothers, Gay Fathers, and Their Children in the United States since World War II | Finalist | |
| 2014 | Matt Richardson | The Queer Limit of Black Memory Black Lesbian Literature and Irresolution | Finalist | |
| 2014 | Ben Smales, Tom Bianchi, and Edmund White | Tom Bianchi: Fire Island Pines. Polaroids 1975-1983 | Finalist | |
| 2014 | Michael Bronski, Ann Pellegrini, and Michael Amico | You Can Tell Just By Looking: And 20 Other Myths about LGBT Life and People | Finalist | |
| 2015 | Lee Lynch | An American Queer: The Amazon Trail | Winner | |
| 2015 | Martin Duberman | Hold Tight Gently: Michael Callen, Essex Hemphill, and the Battlefield of AIDS | Finalist | |
| 2015 | Rebecca J. Anderson | Nevirapine and the Quest to End Pediatric AIDS | Finalist | |
| 2015 | Hilton Als, Ann Temkin, Claudia Carson, Robert Gober, Paulina Pobocha, and Christian Scheidemann | Robert Gober: The Heart Is Not a Metaphor | Finalist | |
| 2015 | Robert Hofler | Sexplosion: From Andy Warhol to A Clockwork Orange, How a Generation of Pop Rebels Broke All the Taboos | Finalist | |
| 2015 | Julie Sondra Decker | The Invisible Orientation: An Introduction to Asexuality | Finalist | |
| 2015 | Aaron H. Devor | The Transgender Archives: Foundations for the Future | Finalist | |
| 2015 | Clayton Delery-Edwards | The Up Stairs Lounge Arson: Thirty-Two Deaths in a New Orleans Gay Bar, June 24, 1973 | Finalist | |
| 2016 | Marcia M. Gallo | No One Helped: Kitty Genovese, New York City, and the Myth of Urban Apathy | Winner | |
| 2016 | Kay Whitlock and Michael Bronski | Considering Hate: Violence, Goodness, and Justice in American Culture and Politics | Finalist | |
| 2016 | Corbett Joan O'Toole | Fading Scars: My Queer Disability History | Finalist | |
| 2016 | Joshua Gamson | Modern Families: Stories of Extraordinary Journeys to Kinship | Finalist | |
| 2016 | Robert Lorway | Namibia's Rainbow Project | Finalist | |
| 2016 | Lillian Faderman | The Gay Revolution: The Story of the Struggle | Finalist | |
| 2016 | Jarrett Neal | What Color Is Your Hoodie? Essays on Black Gay Identity | Finalist | |
| 2017 | David France | How to Survive a Plague: The Inside Story of How Citizens and Science Tamed AIDS | Winner | |
| 2017 | Sarah Schulman | Conflict Is Not Abuse: Overstating Harm, Community Responsibility and the Duty of Repair | Finalist | |
| 2017 | Donald Albrecht with Stephen Vider | Gay Gotham: Art and Underground Culture in New York | Finalist | |
| 2017 | David Greven | Ghost Faces: Hollywood and Post-Millennial Masculinity | Finalist | |
| 2017 | Jurek Wajdowicz | Pride & Joy: Taking the Streets of New York City | Finalist | |
| 2017 | Alexis Pauline Gumbs | Spill: Scenes of Black Feminist Fugitivity | Finalist | |
| 2017 | Ariel Goldberg | The Estrangement Principle | Finalist | |
| 2017 | Kristen Hogan | The Feminist Bookstore Movement: Lesbian Antiracism and Feminist Accountability | Finalist | |
| 2018 | Keeanga-Yamahtta Taylor | How We Get Free: Black Feminism and the Combahee River Collective | Winner | |
| 2018 | Avram Finkelstein | After Silence | Finalist | |
| 2018 | Malik Gaines | Black Performance on the Outskirts of the Left: A History of the Impossible | Finalist | |
| 2018 | Anne Elizabeth Moore | Body Horror: Capitalism, Fear, Misogyny, Jokes | Finalist | |
| 2018 | Hida Viloria | Born Both: An Intersex Life | Finalist | |
| 2018 | Myriam Gurba | Mean | Finalist | |
| 2018 | Clayton Delery | Out for Queer Blood: The Murder of Fernando Rios and the Failure of New Orleans Justice | Finalist | |
| 2018 | John Chaich and Todd Oldham | Queer Threads: Crafting Identity and Community | Finalist | |
| 2019 | Imani Maria Perry | Looking for Lorraine: The Radiant and Radical Life of Lorraine Hansberry | Winner | |
| 2019 | Ria Brodell | Butch Heroes | Finalist | |
| 2019 | Martin Duberman | Has the Gay Movement Failed? | Finalist | |
| 2019 | Piper J. Daniels | Ladies Lazarus | Finalist | |
| 2019 | C.J. Janovy | No Place Like Home: Lessons in Activism from LGBT Kansas | Finalist | |
| 2019 | Avery Cassell | Resistance: The LGBT Fight Against Fascism in WWII | Finalist | |
| 2019 | Jim Elledge | The Boys of Fairy Town: Sodomites, Female Impersonators, Third-Sexers, Pansies, Queers, and Sex Morons in Chicago's First Century | Finalist | |
| 2019 | Charlene A. Carruthers | Unapologetic: A Black, Queer, and Feminist Mandate for Radical Movements | Finalist | |
| 2020 | Carmen Maria Machado | In the Dream House | Winner | |
| 2020 | Cyrus Grace Dunham | A Year Without a Name | Finalist | |
| 2020 | W. Ian Bourland | Bloodflowers: Rotimi Fani-Kayode, Photography, and the 1980s | Finalist | |
| 2020 | Brett Krutzsch | Dying to Be Normal: Gay Martyrs and the Transformation of American Sexual Politics | Finalist | |
| 2020 | E. Patrick Johnson | Honeypot: Black Southern Women Who Love Women | Finalist | |
| 2020 | Selby Wynn Schwartz | The Bodies of Others: Drag Dances and Their Afterlives | Finalist | |
| 2020 | Hugh Ryan | When Brooklyn Was Queer: A History | Finalist | |
| 2020 | Karen Tongson | Why Karen Carpenter Matters | Finalist | |
| 2021 | Ashon Crawley | The Lonely Letters | Winner | |
| 2021 | Ruth Coker Burks | All the Young Men | Finalist | |
| 2021 | Gabriel Ojeda-Sagué and Erich Kessel, Jr. | An Excess of Quiet: Selected Sketches by Gustavo Ojeda, 1979–1989 | Finalist | |
| 2021 | Marty Fink | Forget Burial: HIV Kinship, Disability, and Queer/Trans Narratives of Care | Finalist | |
| 2021 | Josephine Donovan | The Lexington Six: Lesbian and Gay Resistance in 1970s America | Finalist | |
| 2022 | Sarah Schulman | Let the Record Show | Winner | |
| 2022 | Melissa Febos | Girlhood | Finalist | |
| 2022 | Akwaeke Emezi | Dear Senthuran | Finalist | |
| 2022 | Adam Zmith | Deep Sniff: A History of Poppers and Queer Futures | Finalist | |
| 2022 | Kazim Ali | Northern Light: Power, Land, and the Memory of Water | Finalist | |
| 2023 | Hafizah Augustus Geter | The Black Period: On Personhood, Race, and Origin | Winner | |
| 2023 | Sabrina Imbler | How Far the Light Reaches: A Life in Ten Sea Creatures | Finalist | |
| 2023 | Joseph Osmundson | Virology: Essays for the Living, the Dead, and the Small Things in Between | Finalist | |
| 2023 | Ricky Tucker | And the Category Is...: Inside New York's Vogue, House, and Ballroom Community | Finalist | |
| 2023 | Hugh Ryan | The Women's House of Detention: A Queer History of a Forgotten Prison | Finalist | |
| 2024 | Matt Baume | Hi Honey, I'm Homo | Winner | |
| 2024 | Daniel Black | Black on Black: On Our Resilience and Brilliance in America | Finalist | |
| 2024 | Elyssa Maxx Goodman | Glitter and Concrete: A Cultural History of Drag in New York City | Finalist | |
| 2024 | Julie Marie Wade | Otherwise | Finalist | |
| 2024 | John Sovec, LMFT | Out: A Parent's Guide to Supporting your LGBTQIA+ Kid Through Coming Out and Beyond | Finalist | |
| 2025 | Michael Waters | The Other Olympians | Winner | |
| 2025 | Rebecca L. Davis | Fierce Desires | Finalist | |
| 2025 | Diane Ehrensaft and Michelle Jurkiewicz | Gender Explained: A New Understanding of Identity in a Gender Creative World | Finalist | |
| 2025 | Amin Ghaziani | Long Live Queer Nightlife: How the Closing of Gay Bars Sparked a Revolution | Finalist | |
| 2025 | Gemma Rolls-Bentley | Queer Art: From Canvas to Club, and the Spaces Between | Finalist | |
| 2026 | Gaar Adams | Guest Privileges: Queer Lives and Finding Home in the Middle East | Winner | |
| 2026 | Sarah Aziza | The Hollow Half: A Memoir of Bodies and Borders | Finalist | |
| 2026 | Nicholas Boggs | Baldwin: A Love Story | Finalist | |
| 2026 | Anthony Delaney | Queer Enlightenments: A Hidden History of Lovers, Lawbreakers, and Homemakers | Finalist | |
| 2026 | Elizabeth Lovatt | Thank You for Calling the Lesbian Line | Finalist | |
