= Jaquira Díaz =

Puerto Rican writer

Jaquira Diaz
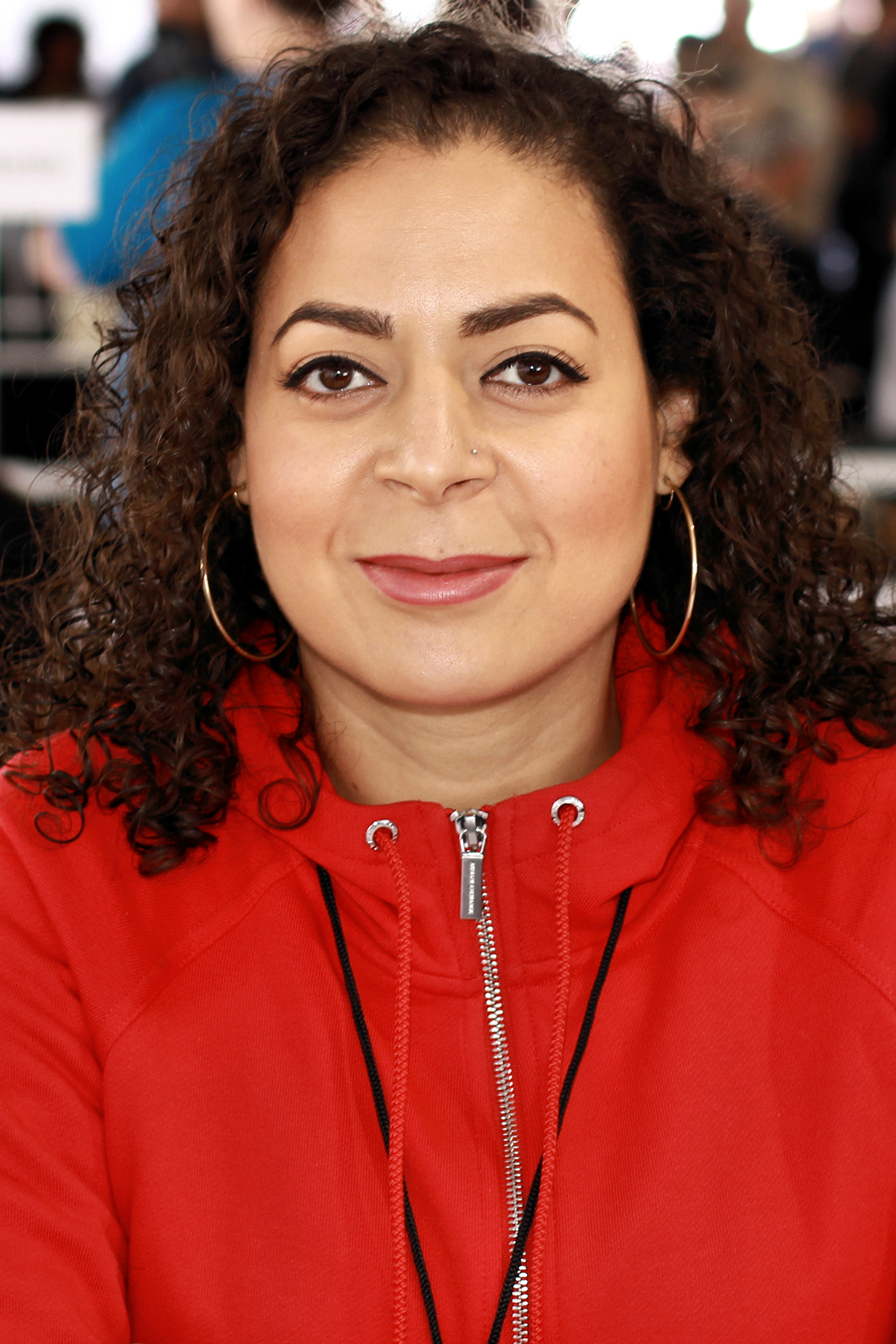
- Díaz at the 2019 Texas Book Festival
- Born: Humacao, Puerto Rico
- Education: University of Central Florida (BA); University of South Florida (MFA)
- Occupation: Writer
- Spouse: Lars Horn (m. 2020)
- Writing career
- Genres: Memoir, Essay, Fiction, Journalism
- Notable awards: Whiting Award, Florida Book Award, Pushcart Prize, Jeanne Córdova Prize

Jaquira Díaz is a Puerto Rican fiction writer, essayist, journalist, cultural critic, and professor. She is the author of Ordinary Girls, which received a Whiting Award in Nonfiction, a Florida Book Awards Gold Medal, was a Lambda Literary Award Finalist, and a Barnes & Noble Discover Prize Finalist. She has written for The Atlantic, Time (magazine), The Best American Essays, Tin House, The Sun, The Fader, Rolling Stone, The Guardian, Longreads,. She was an editor at the Kenyon Review and a visiting professor at the University of Wisconsin–Madison. In 2022, she held the Mina Hohenberg Darden Chair in Creative Writing at Old Dominion University's MFA program and a Pabst Endowed Chair for Master Writers at the Atlantic Center for the Arts. She has taught creative writing at Colorado State University's MFA program, Randolph College's low-residency MFA program, the University of Wisconsin-Madison, and Kenyon College. Díaz lives in New York and is an assistant professor of writing at Columbia University.

== Early life ==
Jaquira Díaz was born in Puerto Rico. Her family lived in the Puerto Rican housing projects, colloquially referred to as el caserío. The neighborhood was made up of government housing, and had something of a dangerous reputation. Díaz, in an interview she gave to Origins, tells stories of being menaced by a machete-armed man, and of raids by the local police force, referred to as los camarones. When she was older, her family moved to Miami after rotating between Humacao and Fajardo. Growing up in Miami Beach during what she describes as the city's "urban blight," she had a difficult life, marked by drug use, attempts at suicide, and encounters with the law. Díaz contributes some of her identity issues to being what she describes as "a closeted queer girl" in a neighborhood where gay people were harassed and attacked. Another issue was the family's financial situation. Her father, who had studied at the University of Puerto Rico and whom she describes as a lover of poetry and literature, became a drug dealer in order to support the family. As she grew older, writing continued to be an important outlet for her, and her writing developed a semi-autobiographical character, often dealing with suicide, drug use, and identity. As a teenager, Díaz won a local essay contest for a piece about Hurricane Andrew, which was subsequently published in the Miami Herald. Her high school teacher, Douglas Williamson, played a pivotal role in encouraging her to pursue writing seriously. Her memoir Ordinary Girls highlights her experience as a Queer Afro-Latina woman growing up in a turbulent and homophobic community.

== Career ==
Díaz's fiction and essays, which are predominantly set in Puerto Rico and Miami, have been described as "lyrical" and "urgent" and are often focused on the intensely personal tragedies and triumphs of young women maturing in a dangerous world. In addition to her literary writing, Díaz writes about crime, politics, sexuality, race, music, and culture, and has been described as an elegant prose stylist. In 2017, Los Angeles Times critic Walton Muyumba listed Díaz as "part of a necessary cipher of extremely gifted freestylers" that includes writers Ta-Nehisi Coates, Isabel Wilkerson, Carol Anderson, Claudia Rankine, Terrance Hayes, Kiese Laymon, Rachel Kaadzi Ghansah, Junot Díaz, and Jelani Cobb, and she was listed among Remezcla's "15 Latinx Music Journalists You Should be Reading" and was included in NPR's Alt.Latino's Favorites: The Songs of 2017, as one of "the cream of the crop of Latinx music writers." In 2018, Electric Literature's Ivelisse Rodriguez named her among the writers who "are changing the topography of Puerto Rican literature," describing Díaz's essays as being "about the awakening of sexual desire and the sexual threat all women experience."

Díaz holds a B.A. from the University of Central Florida and an M.F.A. from the University of South Florida, and has been the recipient of fellowships from The Kenyon Review, the Wisconsin Institute for Creative Writing at the University of Wisconsin–Madison, the Ragdale Foundation, the Virginia Center for the Creative Arts, The MacDowell Colony, the Tin House Summer Writers' Workshop, the Bread Loaf Writers' Conference, the Sewanee Writers' Conference, and an NEA Distinguished Fellowship from the Hambidge Center for the Creative Arts and Sciences. In 2022, she was awarded a Shearing Fellowship from the Berverly Rogers, Carol C. Harter Black Mountain Institute (BMI).

In May 2018, Díaz announced that she had signed a two-book deal with Algonquin Books; the first book, Ordinary Girls, a memoir was published by Algonquin on October 29, 2019, exploring themes of girlhood in a dangerous world, and coming of age in the projects of Puerto Rico and the streets of Miami. Though Ordinary Girls is considered a memoir, Jaquira Díaz refers to it is an "anti-memoir," since her book is not as chronological as traditional memoirs. Her second book, This Is the Only Kingdom, will be a novel.

Díaz teaches in the writing program at Columbia University School of the Arts.

== Personal life ==
Jaquira Díaz is a queer Afro-Latina who grew up in the public housing projects of Puerto Rico and later moved to Miami. She spent much of her adolescence on the streets, as a teenage runaway and a "juvenile delinquent."

== Selected works ==
=== Memoirs ===
- Ordinary Girls: A Memoir. New York: Algonquin Books. June 16, 2020. ISBN 978-1-643750-82-8.

=== Novels ===
- This Is the Only Kingdom: A Novel. New York: Algonquin Books. October 21, 2025. ISBN 978-1-643757-33-9.

=== Essays ===
- "Ordinary Girls" in The Kenyon Review and The Best American Essays 2016
- "Girl Hood: On (Not) Finding Yourself in Books" in Her Kind, reprinted in Waveform: Twenty-first Century Essays by Women (Notable Essay in The Best American Essays 2014)
- "My Mother and Mercy" in The Sun (Notable Essay in The Best American Essays 2015)
- "Beach City" in Brevity and in Pushcart Prize XLII: Best of the Small Presses
- "Baby Lollipops" in The Sun (Notable Essay in The Best American Essays 2012)
- "Monster Story" in Ninth Letter (Notable Essay in The Best American Essays 2017)
- "How Memory is Written and Rewritten: On Adriana Paramo's My Mother's Funeral" in the Los Angeles Review of Books
- "Girls, Monsters" in Tin House (Reprinted in Best American Experimental Writing 2020).
- "You Do Not Belong Here" in the Kenyon Review Online (Notable Essay in The Best American Essays 2018).
- "La Otra" in Longreads (Notable Essay in The Best American Essays 2019).

=== Short stories ===
- "A Fairy Tale Set in Florida, in 10 Parts" in T: The New York Times Style Magazine, in collaboration with Laura van den Berg, Lindsay Hunter, Karen Russell, Alissa Nutting, Andrew Holleran, Lauren Groff, Diana Abu-Jaber, Sarah Gerard, and Jeff VanderMeer.
- "Section 8" in The Southern Review and Pushcart Prize XXXVII: Best of the Small Presses
- "Ghosts" in The Kenyon Review (received Special Mention in Pushcart Prize XL: Best of the Small Presses, and Notable Story in The Best American Nonrequired Reading 2014)
- "December" in Salon, as part of the Two-sentence Holiday Fiction feature

=== Other work ===
- "Who Is the Real Kali Uchis?" in The Fader
- "Inside the Brutal Baby Lollipops Murder Case that Shook South Florida" in Rolling Stone
- "Puerto Rico's Last Political Prisoner" in The Guardian
- "Rescue From Dead Dog Beach" in The Guardian 26 October 2015

== Awards and honors ==
- 2023 Jeanne Córdova Prize for Lesbian/Queer Nonfiction
- 2023 Shearing Fellowship
- 2022 Alonzo Davis Fellowship
- 2020 Whiting Award in Nonfiction for Ordinary Girls
- 2020 Florida Book Awards Gold Medal for Ordinary Girls
- 2020 Lambda Literary Award Finalist in Lesbian Memoir for Ordinary Girls
- 2019 Discover Prize Finalist, Ordinary Girls
- 2019 Barnes & Noble Discover Great New Writers Selection, Ordinary Girls
- 2019 Indie Next Pick, Ordinary Girls
- 2019 Indies Introduce Selection, Ordinary Girls
- 2017 Pushcart Prize for "Beach City"
- 2017 Reynolds Price Short Fiction Award for "Carraízo
- 2016 The Krause Essay Prize Finalist for "Ordinary Girls"
- 2014 Summer Literary Seminars Award in Nonfiction for "Ordinary Girls"
- 2012 Pushcart Prize for "Section 8"
