= Stephen L. Buchmann =

American Entomologist and academic

Stephen Lee Buchmann
- Born: United States, 1952

Academic background
- Education: B.A., Biological Sciences; M.A., Biological Sciences; Ph.D., Entomology
- Alma mater: California State University, Fullerton; University of California, Davis

Academic work
- Institutions: University of Arizona, Tucson

Stephen Lee Buchmann is an American pollination ecologist, melittologist, and evolutionary biologist. He is an adjunct professor of Ecology and Evolutionary Biology, and Entomology at the University of Arizona.

Buchmann’s research interests include native bee intrafloral behavior, especially buzz pollination (including biophysics of poricidal Solanum anthers) and oil-collecting bees (e.g., Centris). He has also studied bee nesting and mating biology and has authored or co-authored more than 230 journal articles and 10 nonfiction trade books. He also holds filmography experience, working as a scientific consultant with many natural history film producers, including National Geographic and the BBC’s Natural History Unit. Additionally, he is a fellow of the Linnean Society of London.

== Education ==
Buchmann received a Bachelor of Arts from California State University in 1974, studying biological science broadly, with a botany minor under C. E. Jones Jr. For his Master of Arts degree, also at CSUF, he studied buzz pollination (floral sonication) in two species of deadly nightshades. His doctoral research, a global study of buzz pollination, culminated in a Ph.D. in Entomology from the University of California, Davis. Moreover, he has also been a Research Associate with the Arizona-Sonora Desert Museum (where he teaches Art Institute classes) and the American Museum of Natural History in New York City.

== Career ==
Since 1979 Stephen Buchmann has been associated with several University of Arizona academic departments, notably the departments of Entomology and the Department of Ecology and Evolutionary Biology. He works as an adjunct professor and affiliate scientist at UA. From 1979 to 2000, he was a Research Entomologist with the USDA-ARS Carl Hayden Bee Research Center in Tucson, AZ. He also co-founded Morpho, Inc., a binational software pattern recognition company. Moreover, between 2000 and 2008, he was founder and president of The Bee Works, an environmental consulting firm.

Buchmann served as a Counselor for the Xerces Society and was formerly Scientist-at-Large, and international coordinator, for the Pollinator Partnership, a nonprofit pollinator conservation organization based in San Francisco. Additionally, he was also the president and board member for the nonprofit Sonoran Arthropod Studies Institute. He has also served as an outsider reviewer for many US federal granting agencies (NSF, NIH), NGO’s (e.g. National Geographic, Earthwatch Institute), and volunteered on the editorial board for several journals, e.g. Journal of Pollination Ecology (JPE).

== Awards and honors ==
- 1980 – Fellow, Linnean Society of London
- 1997 – Benjamin Franklin Award for The Forgotten Pollinators
- 2010 – Outstanding Science Trade Book Award for Young Adults for Letters from the Hive, National Science Teachers Association
- 2023 – Patronym: Anthophora (Anthophoroides) buchmanni Engel

== Books ==
- Buchmann, Stephen L.; Nabhan, Gary Paul (1997). The Forgotten Pollinators. Island Press. ISBN 9781559633536.
- Shepherd, Matthew; Buchmann, Stephen L.; Vaughan, Mace; Black, Scott Hoffman (2003). Pollinator Conservation Handbook: A Guide to Understanding, Protecting, and Providing Habitat for Native Pollinator Insects. The Xerces Society. ISBN 9780974447506.
- Chambers, Nina; Gray, Yajaira; Buchmann, Stephen L. (2004). Pollinators of the Sonoran Desert: A Field Guide (1st ed.). Arizona-Sonora Desert Museum. ISBN 9781886679337.
- Buchmann, Stephen L.; Repplier, Banning (2006). Letters from the Hive: An Intimate History of Bees, Honey, and Humankind. Bantam Books. ISBN 9780553803754.
- National Research Council (U.S.). Committee on the Status of Pollinators in North America (2007). Status of Pollinators in North America. National Academies Press. ISBN 9780309102896.
- Buchmann, Stephen L.; Cohn, Diana (2012). The Bee Tree. Cinco Puntos Press. ISBN 9781935955146.
- Buchmann, Stephen L. (2015). The Reason for Flowers: Their History, Culture, Biology, and How They Change Our Lives. Scribner. ISBN 9781476755533.
- Buchmann, Stephen L. (2023). What a Bee Knows: Exploring the Thoughts, Memories, and Personalities of Bees. Island Press. ISBN 9781642831245.

== Filmography ==
- The Sonoran Desert: A Violent Eden (1997) – Part of “The Desert Speaks” series, produced by KUAT Television.
- Pollinators in Peril (2000) – Turner Original Productions, Hosted and narrated by Peter Fonda, produced by Rhett Turner, Red Sky Productions. Directed by Ann Prum, Coneflower Studio.
- Living with Bugs: Close Encounters (2003) – BBC, produced by Oxford Scientific Films.
- Life in the Undergrowth (2005) – BBC Natural History Unit series, narrated by Sir David Attenborough.
- Honey for the Maya (2011) – YouTube film, produced and directed by Buchmann.
- Wings of Life (2013) – Disneynature feature film, narrated by Meryl Streep, produced and directed by Louie Schwartzberg.
- The Mating Game (2021) – BBC Natural History Unit production, narrated by Sir David Attenborough.
- Planet Insect (2024) – Three-episode series streaming on Curiosity Channel, produced by Steve Nicholls, Hooded Crow Pictures, Ltd.
