= Lars Horn =

- Education: MA, University of Edinburgh MA, École normale supérieure MA, Concordia University
- Occupation: Lecturer at Columbia University Writer Translator
- Spouse: Jaquira Díaz (m. 2020)
- Writing career
- Subjects: Experimental nonfiction, literary nonfiction, translation
- Notable work: Voice of the Fish
- Website: larshorn.com

Lars Horn is a British writer and translator. Their first book, Voice of the Fish, won the 2020 Graywolf Nonfiction Prize and the 2023 Great Lakes Colleges Association New Writers Award. Horn's writing has been published in The Kenyon Review, Virginia Quarterly Review, Poets & Writers, The Rumpus, Literary Hub, and elsewhere.

They live in New York City with their wife, Jaquira Diaz, and teach at Columbia University.
