= Putsata Reang =

Cambodian-American journalist and author

Putsata Reang (born c. 1974) is a Cambodian-American journalist and author.

== Early life ==
Reang was born in Cambodia and raised in Corvallis, Oregon. In 1975, when she was a baby, her family left war-torn Cambodia and escaped to a naval base in the Philippines.

== Career ==
Reang's writing has appeared in appeared in the New York Times, Politico, the Guardian, and elsewhere.

Reang has won fellowships from the Alicia Patterson Foundation and Jack Straw Cultural Center.

Reang's memoir Ma and Me, about her family's escape to the United States and her difficult relationship with her mother, came out in 2022. It won the 2023 Pacific Northwest Book Award, and was also a finalist for the 2023 Lesbian Memoir/Biography Lambda Literary Award, the Dayton Literary Peace Prize, and the Washington State Book Award.

Reang teaches memoir writing at the University of Washington School of Professional & Continuing Education.

== Personal life ==
Reang is married to a woman. As she wrote in a 2016 "Modern Love" column for the New York Times, "I’m gay, or a version of it. I came out to my mother in my 20s as gay because there is no word in our Khmer language for bisexual."
