= Francisco González Crussí =

Mexican physician and writer

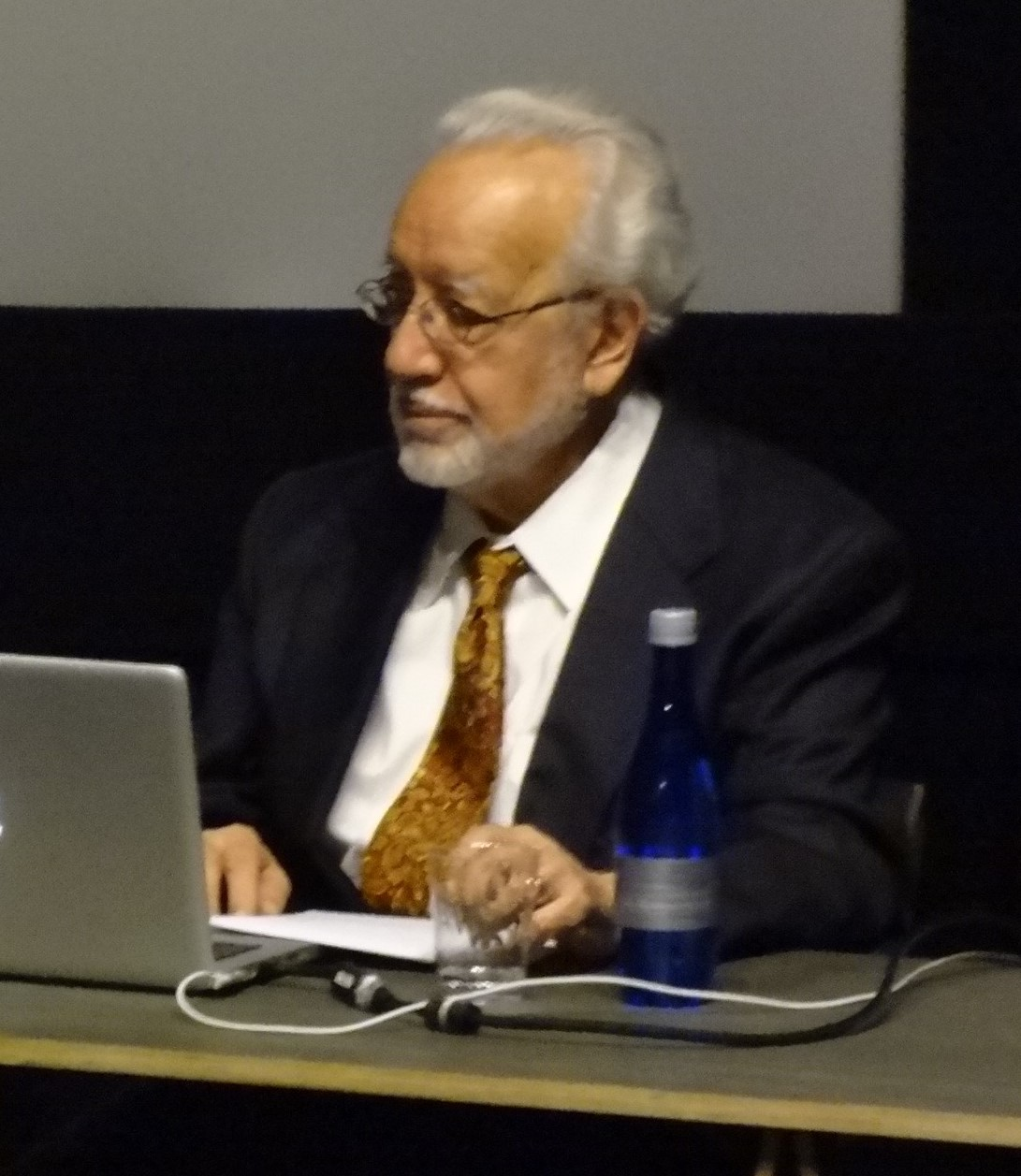
- Francisco Gonzalez-Crussi, 2013
- Born: 1936 (age 89–90); Mexico City
- Citizenship: American (from 1987)
- Education: National Autonomous University of Mexico (1961)
- Occupations: Pathologist, author
- Years active: 1961–present

Francisco Gonzalez-Crussi is a Mexican physician and writer whose career extended along the two disciplines of medicine and literature. (Né Francisco, his Anglicized name, Frank, has been used in his English-language productions).

== Biography ==
Born in a modest neighborhood of Mexico City in 1936, F. Gonzalez-Crussi was raised by his widowed mother, who owned a small drugstore. He studied medicine in the National Autonomous University of Mexico, and graduated in 1961. He migrated to the United States, where he obtained post-graduate training in the specialty of pathology, later sub-specializing in pediatric pathology. He began his career in 1967 in academic medicine in Canada, at Queen's University (Kingston, Ontario), and moved back to the United States in 1973, where he was a Professor of Pathology at Indiana University until 1978, when he relocated to Chicago, there to become Professor of Pathology at Northwestern University School of Medicine and Head of Laboratories of Children's Memorial Hospital until his retirement in 2001. His literary work first became known in 1985, with the appearance of his book Notes of an Anatomist, to considerable critical acclaim. He became a naturalized American citizen in 1987. He married Wei Hsueh, a biomedical researcher, in 1978.

Among the awards he has won is a Fellowship of the Simon Guggenheim Memorial Foundation (September 2000 to February 2001), a Certificate of Achievement by the Office of the Secretary of State of Illinois (2009), a career achievement prize by the ABC Hospital of Mexico City (2009) and a Medal of Merit from the University of Veracruz, Mexico. Between 2005 and 2007 he was appointed as consultant in the discipline of literary essay, in the Mexican government's office in charge of promoting culture and the arts, F.O.N.C.A. (Fondo Nacional para la Cultura y las Artes). In 2014 he was awarded the Merck Literary Prize in Rome, for his book Carrying the Heart (translated as Organi Vitali, Adelphi, Milan, 2014). On November 19, 2019 he was awarded the "Pedro Henriquez Ureña International Prize for the Essay" given by the Mexican Academy of Language (Academia Mexicana de la Lengua)

== Awards and recognition ==
- Fellowship of the Simon Guggenheim Memorial Foundation (September 2000 to February 2001)
- Certificate of Achievement by the Office of the Secretary of State of Illinois (2009)
- Career achievement prize by the ABC Hospital of Mexico City (2009)
- Medal of Merit from the University of Veracruz, Mexico
- Consultant in the discipline of literary essay to the Mexican Government's Office of Culture and Arts - F.O.N.C.A. (Fondo Nacional para la Cultura y las Artes) 2005 to 2007
- Merck Prize, Science & Literature, Rome, Italy, June 10, 2014;
- Pedro Henriquez Ureña International Prize for the Essay, awarded by the Mexican Academy of Language, November 2019.

== Works ==
In the medical field, in addition to about 200 articles in peer-reviewed journals of his medical speciality, he wrote two books:

- Extragonadal Teratomas, a text-atlas published under the auspices of the Armed Forces Institute of Pathology, Washington, D. C., 1982.
- Nephroblastoma (Wilms' tumor) and Related Renal Tumors of Childhood, CRC Press, Boca Raton, Florida, 1984.

In the literary field, his work has been chiefly in the essay genre, in both English and Spanish.

Books written in English:

- Notes of an Anatomist (Harcourt Brace, 1985) First prize for non-fiction of the Society of Midland Authors (1985). Reviewed in the New York Times, 1985.
- Three Forms of Sudden Death (Harper & Row, 1986).
- On the Nature of Things Erotic (Harcourt Brace, 1988). An excerpt was published as first serial in The New York Times Book Review.
- The Five Senses (Harcourt Brace, 1989). Nominee for the Los Angeles Times Book Prize for the publishing year August 1, 1988 to July 31, 1989.
- The Day of the Dead and Other Mortal Reflections (Harcourt Brace, 1993). Reviewed in The New York Times, and the Chicago Reader, 1994.
- Suspended Animation (Harcourt Brace, 1995). Nominee in the 1966 PEN/Spielfogel-Diamonstein Award for the Art of the Essay. Reviewed by The New York Times, 1995.
- There is a World Elsewhere (Riverhead Books, 1998). Reviewed in Chicago Tribune 1998.
- On Being Born and Other Difficulties (Overlook Press, 2004). Reviewed in The Washington Post in 2004.
- On Seeing. Things Seen, Unseen and Obscene. (Overlook Press, New York, 2006). Reviewed in Nature, 2006.
- A Short History of Medicine (Random House, Modern Library Chronicles, 2007).
- Carrying the Heart (Kaplan Publishing, 2009). Reviewed in The New York Review of Books in 2009.
- The Body Fantastic (Massachusetts Institute of Technology, 2021). Foreword by John Banville. Reviewed in The Boston Globe.
- The Language of the Face. Stories of Its Uniquely Expressive Features(Massachusetts Institute of Technology, 2023). Listed in Google Books.

Books written and published in Spanish:

- Notas de un anatomista (Fondo de Cultura Económica, Mexico, 1990).
- Partir es Morir un Poco (U.N.A.M., 1996).
- Los cinco sentidos (trans. Verónica Murguía; Conaculta/INBA/Verdehalago, 2002).
- Venir al Mundo (Verdehalago, 2006).
- La Fábrica del Cuerpo (Turner, Ortega & Ortiz, 2006).
- Horas Chinas (Siglo XXI, Mexico).
- Remedios de Antaño (Fondo de Cultura Económica, Mexico, 2012).
- El Rostro y El Alma. Siete Ensayos Fisiognomicos (Penguin-Random House, Mexico, 2014)
- La Enfermedad del Amor (Penguin -Random House, Mexico, 2016).
- Del Cuerpo Imponderable (Academia Mexicana de la Lengua, Mexico, 2020)
- Las Folías del Sexo (Penguin-Random House / Debate, Mexico, 2020).
- Más Allá del Cuerpo (Grano de Sal, Mexico, 2021).

Foreign translations of Gonzalez-Crussi's books include: Dutch, French, Spanish, Italian, German, Portuguese, Slovak, Czech, Polish, Chinese and Japanese.

In the English language, Gonzalez-Crussi has contributed book reviews to The New York Times, The Washington Post, Nature and Commonweal. Excerpts of his work have appeared in The New Yorker, Harper's Magazine and The Sciences. In the Spanish language, his work has appeared in various periodical publications of Mexico (Letras Libres, Cambio, Tierra Adentro, Luvina) and Peru (Etiqueta Negra)

Theater play: The work of Gonzalez Crussi was adapted for the stage in 1995 by a theatrical company of Chicago (Live Bait Company, director Sharon Evans), under the name "Memento Mori". Reviewed in Chicago Tribune, and Chicago Sun-Times in 1995.

This play was also presented in Seattle (November-December 1996) by the Aha! Theater Company. Reviewed in The Seattle Times in 1996.

Television Documentary: The literary work of Gonzalez Crussi was featured by the British Broadcasting Corporation. The BBC production (director Kevin Hull) was entitled "Day of the Dead", which was filed in the British Film Institute archive. It was part of the TV series Bookmark, and was first aired in the UK on April 27, 1992 on BBC2. The film was reviewed in The Daily Telegraph; in The Times; and the BMJ in 1992.
