= Thomas Swiss =

American poet and writer

- Education: University of Illinois Urbana-Champaign; Iowa Writers' Workshop (MFA)
- Occupations: Poet; writer

Thomas Swiss is an American poet and writer. He taught at Drake University and the University of Iowa before teaching at the American University of Paris and the University of Minnesota.

== Life ==
Swiss grew up in the suburbs of Chicago, mostly in Aurora, Illinois, where his father had an optometric practice. He graduated from the University of Illinois-Urbana, moved to Nottingham, England and returned to Illinois to work for the National Council of Teachers of English. In 1976, Swiss went to the Writers' Workshop at the University of Iowa and earned an M.F.A. in creative writing. He was awarded a National Endowment for the Arts Fellowship and published his first book of poems, Measure, with the University of Alabama Press. Swiss' next book, Rough Cut, was published by the University of Illinois Press.

Swiss' poems have appeared in many periodicals, including The American Scholar, Boston Review, AGNI, and the Iowa Review. His collaborative new media poems and literary projects have been exhibited in museums and art shows, including shows at the School of Visual Arts, New York; and South By Southwest, Austin TX.

Swiss' critical articles have been published inPopular Music, Postmodern Culture, Current Musicology, and other journals. His book reviews have been published in The New York Times Book Review and other magazines.

Swiss has authored critical articles and book chapters, and edited or co-edited nine books including New Media Poetics: Contexts, Technotexts, and Theories;Highway 61 Revisited: Bob Dylan's Road from Minnesota to the World; The World Wide Web and Contemporary Cultural Theory : Magic, Metaphor, Power; and a collection of essays on the topic of the imaginaries and materialities of the mobile Internet (Routledge).

== Selected publications ==
- Swiss, T. (Ed.). (2001). Unspun: Key concepts for understanding the World Wide Web. New York: New York University Press.
- Swiss, T., & Herman, A. (Eds.). (2000). The World Wide Web and contemporary cultural theory: Magic, metaphor, power. Oxford: Routledge.
- Swiss, T. (1997). Rough Cut: Poems. Urbana, Illinois: University of Illinois Press.
- Swiss, T. New media collaborative poems, Revised November 2009
- Swiss, T., and Horner, B. (Eds.), (2000). Key Terms in Popular Music and Culture, Boston, Massachusetts: Blackwell. ISBN 978-0-631-21264-5
- Morris, A., & Swiss, T. (Eds.). (2009). New Media Poetics, Cambridge: The MIT Press. June 2006, ISBN 978-0-262-13463-7
- Sheehy, C., & Swiss, T. (2009). Highway 61 Revisited: Bob Dylan’s Road from Minnesota to the World, Minneapolis: University of Minnesota Press. ISBN 978-0-8166-6100-8

== External references ==
- T h o m a s + S w i s s
- Thomas Swiss page, University of Minnesota
- Books by Thomas Swiss
