= Nishant Batsha =

Indian-American writer

- Education: Columbia University, University of Oxford
- Occupation: Novelist
- Children: 2
- Writing career
- Language: English
- Genres: history, fiction
- Notable work: Mother Ocean Father Nation
- Website: nishantbatsha.com

Nishant Batsha is an Indian-American writer of fiction and history, best known for his Lambda Literary Award-nominated novel Mother Ocean Father Nation.

== Early life and education ==
Batsha is a child of Indian immigrants from Bihar.

He attended Columbia University as an undergraduate and studied history and South Asian Studies. He has a master's degree from Oxford University in Global and Imperial history. There, he discovered his interest in writing after he submitted an essay to The Awl when he was in his early twenties. Batsha originally set out to complete at PhD in History, which he returned to Columbia for. He studied Indian indentured servitude in Fiji and Trinidad for his PhD program and says he'd have never written the novels he did without that experience.

== Personal life ==
He has worked at Words Without Borders in the past.

Batsha lives in Buffalo, NY, with his wife and two children.

== Selected works ==
Mother Ocean Father Nation is set on a South Pacific Island nation in 1985 that is experiencing a military coup. LitHub named it one of the best covers of June 2022. It was nominated for a Lambda Literary Award in Bisexual Fiction.
