= Meryl Wilsner =

American novelist (born 1990)

- Born: 1990 (age 35–36); Michigan, USA
- Education: Lewis & Clark College in Portland, Oregon
- Occupation: Novelist
- Writing career
- Period: 2020–present
- Genre: LGBTQ romance
- Website: www.merylwilsner.com

Meryl Wilsner (born 1990) is a non-binary queer romance novelist. They are best known for their novels featuring lesbian protagonists, such as Cleat Cute and Something to Talk About.

== Life and education ==
=== Early life ===
Meryl Wilsner was born in Michigan, in 1990 and pursued a college education outside of their home state, attending Lewis & Clark College in Portland, Oregon, where they studied political science.

=== Personal life ===
Wilsner lives in Grand Rapids, Michigan with their wife.

== Writing career ==
Wilsner began writing at a young age and honed their craft in fan fiction environments. Their first book was published during the pandemic limiting opportunities for marketing the book.

In 2024 it was announced that Cleat Cute would be adapted by Sue Bird, former professional basketball player, and Megan Rapinoe, former professional soccer player, through their production company A Touch More in collaboration with Future Shack Entertainment with.

=== Novels ===
- Something to Talk About, Berkley Books, 2020
- Mistakes Were Made, Griffin, 2022
- Cleat Cute, Griffin, 2023
- My Best Friend's Honeymoon, Griffin, 2025

== Awards and recognition ==
- 2020 - New York Public Library Best Books for Adults 2020 – Something to Talk About
