= Marcial Gala =

Cuban writer, poet and architect

- Born: 1963 (age 61–62)
- Occupation: Novelist, short story writer, poet
- Language: Spanish
- Period: 1990s—now
- Notable works: Llámenme Cassandra, La Catedral de Los Negros

Marcial Gala (born 1963) is a Cuban writer, poet, and architect, who has received numerous prizes for his literary works.

== Biography ==
Marcial Gala was born in Havana, Cuba in 1963. He first trained in behavioral psychiatry (ergoterapia psiquiatra) at Politécnico de la Salud de Santiago de Cuba in 1983, and received additional training as an architect in Universidad Central de las Villas, Santa Clara in 1992.

He has received the Premio Alejo Carpentier for his novel La Catedral de los negros. His books have been translated into numerous languages, including English, German, Polish, Italian and Portuguese.

He currently resides in Buenos Aires, Argentina.

== Awards ==
- Premio Alejo Carpentier for La Catedral de los negros, in 2012.
- Premio Anual de la Crítica for La Catedral de los negros, in 2012.
- The English translation of his novel Llánmenme Cassandra by Anna Kushner was nominated for the 35th Lambda Literary Awards in the category "Gay Fiction," in 2023.

== Bibliography ==
=== Novels ===
- Marcial Gala (2019). Rocanrol. Buenos Aires: Corregidor.
- Marcial Gala (2019). Llámenme Cassandra. Buenos Aires: Alfaguara.
  - Call me Cassandra. New York: Farrar, Straus, Giroux. Translated by Anna Kushner.
- Marcial Gala (2013). Monasterio. Buenos Aires: Atmósfera Literaria.
- Marcial Gala (2012). La catedral de los negros. Buenos Aires: Corregidor.
  - Black Cathedral. London: Picador Paper. Translated by Anna Kushner.
- Marcial Gala (2004). Sentada en su verde limón. Havana: Editorial Letras Cubanas.

=== Short Fiction ===
- Marcial Gala (2010). Es muy temprano. Havana: Editorial Letras Cubanas.
- Marcial Gala (2002). El hechizado. Cuba: Ediciones Mecenas.
- Marcial Gala (1997). Dios y los locos. Cuba: Ediciones Mecenas.
- Marcial Gala (1996). El juego que no cesa. Habana: Editorial Letras Cubana.

=== Poetry ===
- Marcial Gala (2010). Moneda de a centavo. Cuba: Ediciones Mecenas.
