= Jonathan Waldman =

American journalist

- Education: Dartmouth College, Boston University
- Occupations: Journalist; writer
- Writing career
- Genre: non-fiction

Jonathan Waldman is an American journalist, and non-fiction writer.

== Life ==
He grew up in Washington, D.C., and graduated from Dartmouth College, and Boston University. He was Scripps Fellow in environmental journalism at the University of Colorado, and his 2015 book Rust: The Longest War was a finalist for the Los Angeles Times Book Prize, and won the 2016 Colorado Book Award in the "general non-fiction" category.

== Works ==
- Jonathan Waldman (10 March 2015). Rust: The Longest War. Simon and Schuster. ISBN 9781451691597.
- Jonathan Waldman (26 January 2021). SAM: One Robot, a Dozen Engineers, and the Race to Revolutionize the Way We Build. Simon and Schuster. ISBN 9781501140600.
