= Susan McClelland =

Canadian author and journalist

- Born: November 8, 1967 (age 58); Canada
- Occupations: Author, Filmmaker, Entrepreneur
- Website: https://www.susanelizamcclelland.com/

Susan McClelland is a Canadian investigative journalist and author known for her collaboration on memoirs detailing experiences of war, human rights abuses, and systemic injustice.

== Early life and education ==
McClelland earned an undergraduate degree in arts and science from McMaster University, graduating in 1990. She holds a master's degree in communications from the University of Miami.

== Career ==
McClelland began her career in Miami, interning at the New York Times bureau and the Miami Herald. She then moved to Maclean's, Canada's weekly newsmagazine. As a freelance magazine journalist she has contributed to publications such as The Globe and Mail, Maclean’s, Chatelaine, Canadian Living, The Walrus, The Guardian, and The Sunday Times Magazine.

Many of McClelland's books are co-written with individuals who experienced war or systemic injustice firsthand. She collaborated with Mariatu Kamara, a young survivor of the Sierra Leone civil war, to write The Bite of the Mango (2008), recounting Kamara’s ordeal and recovery. It details her journey from having her hands amputated by rebels at age 12 to becoming a UNICEF Special Representative.

In 2014, she collaborated with Lucia Jang to write Stars Between the Sun and Moon: One Woman’s Life in North Korea and Escape to Freedom. It is a memoir of Jang's harrowing life under the Kim regime, including famine, imprisonment, and eventual escape to freedom.

She co-authored Every Falling Star: The True Story of How I Survived and Escaped North Korea with Sungju Lee in 2016. It describes his life as a street child after his family’s desperate attempt to flee the country failed.

She co-authored Boy from Buchenwald: The True Story of a Holocaust Survivor with Robbie Waisman (Romek Wajsman) in 2021. The story of Waisman’s survival as one of the “Buchenwald Boys” liberated from the Nazi concentration camp in 1945, and his journey of healing after the Holocaust. That year, she co-wrote My Daughter Rehtaeh Parsons with Glen Canning. It is Canning's account of his teenage daughter Rehtaeh Parsons’ experience as a victim of sexual assault and cyberbullying in Nova Scotia, Canada, and the societal failures that led to her death. The book serves as both memoir and call to action against rape culture.

In February 2025, McClelland and Charlotte Lindsay Marron were announced as winners of the Propelle Content Accelerator program for their documentary series project How to Kill Someone in the 21st Century. This recognition came with a development deal to advance the eight-part investigative series examining cyber-enabled crimes.
