= Prathna Lor =

Canadian writer

- Education: PhD in English
- Alma mater: University of Toronto
- Occupation: novelist
- Writing career
- Language: English
- Genres: fiction, poetry
- Subject: grief
- Notable work: Emanations

Prathna Lor is an autistic Canadian poet, essayist, educator, and editor best known for their Lambda Literary Award-nominated poetry collection Emanations.

== Early life ==
Lor completed a PhD in the department of English at the University of Toronto.

They are based in Tiohtià:ke/Montreal.

== Selected works ==
Lor's second poetry chapbook, 7, 2, was published in 2019 by Knife Fork Book.

They say their debut poetry collection Emanations is predominantly about grief and how it connects fragmentation, commodification, and identity. It was nominated for a Lambda Literary Award in Transgender fiction.
