= Jeremiah Moss =

American poet (born 1971)

Griffin Hansbury
- Born: 1971 (age 54–55)
- Education: New York University
- Writing career
- Pen name: Jeremiah Moss

Jeremiah Moss, pseudonym of Griffin Hansbury (born 1971), is an American poet, writer, psychoanalyst, social worker, and social critic. He was the author of the blog Jeremiah's Vanishing New York, which ran from 2007 until 2022.

Hansbury revealed his identity as Moss in 2017.

== Early life and education ==
Moss grew up in Massachusetts. He moved to New York City's East Village when he was 22, inspired by New York writers like Frank O'Hara and J.D. Salinger.

Hansbury earned a Master's degree from the Creative Writing Program of New York University.

== Jeremiah's Vanishing New York ==
Moss created Jeremiah's Vanishing New York in July 2007. The first post mourned the loss of the iconic speakeasy Chumley's in Greenwich Village. The blog chronicles the rapidly changing New York City streetscape through posts about closed and potentially closing old time businesses. The blog had 2,700 posts as of April 2015.

The name Jeremiah Moss comes from the name of the main character of a never published novel Hansbury wrote about a dyspeptic East Village resident. He chose Jeremiah as a nod to the prophet Jeremiah, who he said “was the prophet of doom who nobody listened to until it was too late.” He decided to not use his real name because he thought it would disrupt his day job.

In 2014, he began a movement to save the Café Edison, a long-running restaurant on West 47th Street popular with people who worked on Broadway. He promoted the hashtag #SaveCafeEdison and organized "lunch mobs" (flash mobs which would order food from the restaurant in order to support it financially). The effort did not succeed, but it led Moss to begin to actively campaign against the forces that were driving the changes he despised, instead of simply writing about them.

Moss advocates for the Small Business Jobs Survival Act, a New York City Council bill first introduced in 1986 that would mandate arbitration in the renewal of some commercial leases. He believes the bill would prevent the loss of many small businesses.

== Publications ==
As Hansbury, he published Day for Night, a collection of poems in 2000, and The Nostalgist in 2013, a fictional look at post 9/11 life in the city. In 2017, Moss published the book Vanishing New York: How a Great City Lost Its Soul. The book details Moss' view that contemporary New York is being destroyed by what he calls “hyper-gentrification”.

In October 2022, Moss published a book about life in New York City during the COVID-19 pandemic titled Feral City. The book criticizes the gentrification of New York.

== Awards and honors ==
As Hansbury, Moss has been awarded fellowships from the New York Foundation for the Arts in 1999 and 2005.

== Personal life ==
Hansbury is a transgender man, transitioning in 1995. Moss has lived in a rent-controlled East Village apartment since the late 1990s.

== Books ==
- Vanishing New York: How a Great City Lost Its Soul (Dey Street Books, 2017)
- Feral City (WW Norton, 2022)
- Some Strange Music Draws Me In
