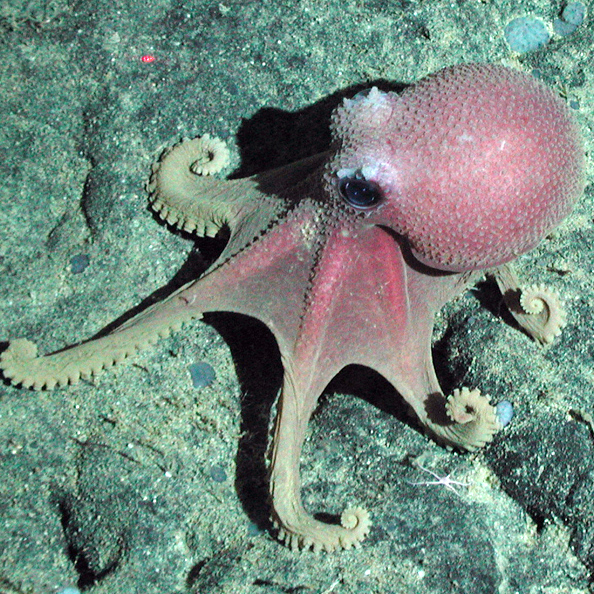
- G. boreopacifica on the Davidson Seamount at 1,973 m (6,473 ft) m depth
- G. boreopacifica at a depth of 2,405 m (7,890 ft)

Conservation status
- Least Concern (IUCN 3.1)

Scientific classification
- Kingdom: Animalia
- Phylum: Mollusca
- Class: Cephalopoda
- Order: Octopoda
- Family: Megaleledonidae
- Genus: Graneledone
- Species: G. boreopacifica

Binomial name
- Graneledone boreopacifica Nesis, 1982

Synonyms
- Graneledone pacifica Voss & Pearcy, 1990

= Graneledone boreopacifica =

Species of mollusc

Graneledone boreopacifica is an octopus in the family Megaleledonidae. It can be found in both the Pacific and the Atlantic Oceans.

== Description ==
The holotype of this species measures 9 centimetres (3.5 in) in mantle length.

A female Graneledone boreopacifica was observed in the Monterey Canyon by the Monterey Bay Aquarium Research Institute, brooding her eggs for a record 53 months, making this the longest egg-brooding period known in the animal kingdom. There is no evidence that females ever feed again after laying their eggs. This timespan also makes it the longest-living octopus; most octopuses only live for 1 or 2 years, which this octopus beats with its brooding period alone. Female Graneledone boreopacifica tend to brood their eggs between the depths of 1,200 and 2,000 metres (3,900 and 6,600 ft); the eggs were never unattended.

Examination of the gut of this octopus revealed significant amounts of crushed gastropod shells (Provanna variabilis and Lepetodrilus fucensis). The mandible muscles exhibit remarkable strength to crush the shells before digestion.

== Distribution and habitat ==
Graneledone boreopacifica is found in benthic zones in temperate climates.

== Taxonomy ==
The type specimen was collected in the Pacific Ocean (50°N, 151°E) and is deposited at the Zoological Institute in Saint Petersburg, Russia.
