= Lambda Literary Award for LGBTQ+ Studies =

Annual literary award

- Awarded for: Literary award
- Sponsored by: Lambda Literary Foundation
- Date: Annual
- Website: lambdaliterary.org/awards

The Lambda Literary Award for LGBTQ+ Studies is an annual literary award, presented by the Lambda Literary Foundation, presented to scholarly work that address "issues relating to sexual orientation and gender identity, and oriented toward academia, libraries, cultural professionals, and the more academic reader." Most works are published by university presses.

== Recipients ==
Lambda Literary Award for LGBTQ+ Studies Recipients
Year	Author	Title	Result	Ref.
2002	Joyce Murdoch and Deb Price	Courting Justice: Gay Men and Lesbians v. the Supreme Court	Winner	
2002	Gay Wachman	Lesbian Empire: Radical Crosswriting in the Twenties	Finalist	
2002	Suzanna Danuta Walters	All the Rage: The Story of Gay Visibility in America	Finalist	
2002	William J. Mann	Behind the Screen: How Gays and Lesbians Shaped Hollywood, 1910-1969	Finalist	
2002	Ricardo J. Brown and William Reichard (editors)	The Evening Crowd at Kirmser's	Finalist	
2003	Neil Miller	Sex-Crime Panic	Winner	
2003	Craig Rimmerman	From Identity to Politics	Finalist	
2003	Colm Tóibín	Love in a Dark Time	Finalist	
2003	Ruth Vanita (editor)	Queering India	Finalist	
2003	David Nimmons	Soul Beneath the Skin	Finalist	
2004	Devon W. Carbado and Donald Weise (editors)	Time on Two Crosses	Winner	
2004	Wayne Besen	Anything But Straight	Finalist	
2004	Michael Mancilla and Lisa Troshinsky	Love in the Time of HIV	Finalist	
2004	James McCourt	Queer Street	Finalist	
2004	Mack Friedman	Strapped for Cash	Finalist	
2005	Elisabeth Kirtsoglou	For the Love of Women: Gender, Identity and Same-Sex Relations in a Greek Provincial Town	Winner	
2005	Andrea Barnet	All-Night Party	Finalist	
2005	Will Fellows	A Passion to Preserve	Finalist	
2005	Abigail Garner	Families Like Mine	Finalist	
2005	Evan Wolfson	Why Marriage Matters	Finalist	
2006	Susan Ackerman	When Heroes Love: The Ambiguity of Eros in the Stories of Gilgamesh and David	Winner	
2006	Jennifer Kelly	Zest for Life: Lesbians' Experience of Menopause	Finalist	
2006	Dwight A. McBride	Why I Hate Abercrombie and Fitch	Finalist	
2006	Esther D. Rothblum and Penny Sablove (editors)	Lesbian Communities Festivals, Rvs And the Internet	Finalist	
2006	Ruth Vanita	Love's Rite: Same-Sex Marriage in India and the West	Finalist	
2007	Horace Griffin	Their Own Receive Them Not	Winner	
2007	Robert McRuer	Crip Theory	Finalist	
2007	Kathryn Stockton	Beautiful Bottom, Beautiful Shame	Finalist	
2007	Carellin Brooks	Every Inch A Man: Phallic Possession, etc.	Finalist	
2007	David Eisenbach	Gay Power: An American Revolution	Finalist	
2008	Sharon Marcus	Between Women	Winner	
2008	Bertram Cohler	Writing Desire	Finalist	
2008	Pagan Kennedy	The First Man-Made Man	Finalist	
2008	Mark Padilla	Caribbean Pleasure Industry	Finalist	
2008	Robert Reid-Pharr	Once You Go Black: Choice, Desire, & the Black American Intellectual	Finalist	
2009	Regina Kunzel	Criminal Intimacy: Prison and the Uneven History of Modern American Sexuality	Winner	
2009	Michelle Ann Abate	Tomboys: A Literary & Cultural History	Finalist	
2009	Amin Ghaziani	The Dividends of Dissent: How Conflict and Culture Work in Lesbian and Gay Marches on Washington	Finalist	
2009	Kevin P. Murphy	Political Manhood: Red Bloods, Mollycoddles, & the Politics of Progressive Reform	Finalist	
2009	Linda Williams	Screening Sex	Finalist	
2010	Margot Canaday	The Straight State: Sexuality and Citizenship in Twentieth Century America	Winner	
2010	Armando Maggi	The Resurrection of the Body: Pier Paolo Pasolini from Saint Paul to Sade	Finalist	
2010	Julie Abraham	Metropolitan Lovers: The Homosexuality of Cities	Finalist	
2010	Deborah B. Gould	Moving Politics: Emotion and ACT UP's Fight Against AIDS	Finalist	
2010	Kathryn Bond Stockton	The Queer Child, or Growing Sideways in the Twentieth Century	Finalist	
2011	Scott Herring	Another Country: Queer Anti-Urbanism	Winner	
2011	Gayle Salamon	Assuming a Body: Transgender and Rhetorics of Materiality	Winner	
2011	Fran Martin	Backward Glances: Contemporary Chinese Cultures and the Female Homoerotic Imaginary	Finalist	
2011	Deborah Cohler	Citizen Invert Queer: Lesbianism and War in Early Twentieth-Century Britain	Finalist	
2011	Rafael de la Dehesa	Queering the Public Sphere in Mexico and Brazil: Sexual Rights Movements in Emerging Democracies	Finalist	
2012	Lisa L. Moore	Sister Arts: The Erotics of Lesbian Landscapes	Winner	
2012	Eric A. Stanley and Nat Smith (editors)	Captive Genders: Trans Embodiment and the Prison Industrial Complex	Finalist	
2012	Chandan Reddy	Freedom with Violence: Race, Sexuality, and the US State	Finalist	
2012	Margot Weiss	Techniques of Pleasure: BDSM and the Circuits of Sexuality	Finalist	
2012	Jafari S. Allen	¡Venceremos?: The Erotics of Black Self-making in Cuba	Finalist	
2013	Ramón H. Rivera-Servera	Performing Queer Latinidad: Dance, Sexuality, Politics	Winner	
2013	Louis-Georges Tin	The Invention of Heterosexual Culture	Finalist	
2013	Ernesto Javier Martínez	On Making Sense: Queer Race Narratives of Intelligibility	Finalist	
2013	Ashley Currier	Out of Africa: LGBT Organizing in Namibia and South Africa	Finalist	
2013	Bernadette C. Barton	Pray the Gay Away The Extraordinary Lives of Bible Belt Gays	Finalist	
2013	Brenna M. Munro	South Africa and the Dream of Love to Come: Queer Sexuality and the Struggle for Freedom	Finalist	
2013	Sara Warner	Acts of Gaiety: LGBT Performance and the Politics of Pleasure	Finalist	
2013	Ann Cvetkovich	Depression: A Public Feeling	Finalist	
2013	Tracy Baim	Gay Press, Gay Power: The Growth of LGBT Community Newspapers in America	Finalist	
2013	David M. Halperin	How To Be Gay	Finalist	
2014	Christina B. Hanhardt	Safe Space: Gay Neighborhood History and the Politics of Violence	Winner	
2014	Marlon M. Bailey	Butch Queens Up in Pumps Gender, Performance, and Ballroom Culture in Detroit	Finalist	
2014	Victoria Hesford	Feeling Women's Liberation	Finalist	
2014	Colin R. Johnson	Just Queer Folks: Gender and Sexuality in Rural America	Finalist	
2014	Lisa Henderson	Love and Money: Queers, Class, and Cultural Production	Finalist	
2014	Susana Pena	Oye Loca: From the Mariel Boatlift to Gay Cuban Miami	Finalist	
2014	Afsaneh Najmabadi	Professing Selves: Transsexuality and Same-Sex Desire in Contemporary Iran	Finalist	
2014	Lucetta Yip Lo Kam	Shanghai Lalas	Finalist	
2014	Peter M. Coviello	Tomorrow's Parties: Sex and the Untimely	Finalist	
2014	Isaac West	Transforming Citizenships: Transgender Articulations of the Law	Finalist	
2015	Vincent Woodard, Justin A. Joyce and Dwight McBride (editors)	Delectable Negro: Human Consumption and Homoeroticism within US Slave Culture	Winner	
2015	Noelle M. Stout	After Love: Queer Intimacy and Erotic Economies in Post-Soviet Cuba	Finalist	
2015	Rachel Hope Cleves	Charity & Sylvia: A Same-Sex Marriage in Early America	Finalist	
2015	Marcia Ochoa	Queen for a Day: Transformistas, Beauty Queens, and the Performance of Femininity in Venezuela	Finalist	
2015	Lisa Tatonetti	The Queerness of Native American Literature	Finalist	
2015	Juana María Rodríguez	Sexual Futures, Queer Gestures, and Other Latina Longings	Finalist	
2015	Susan S. Lanser	The Sexuality of History: Modernity and the Sapphic	Finalist	
2015	Bobby Benedicto	Under Bright Lights: Gay Manila and the Global Scene	Finalist	
2016	Hiram Pérez	A Taste for Brown Bodies: Gay Modernity and Cosmopolitan Desire	Winner	
2016	Clare Sears	Arresting Dress: Cross-Dressing, Law, and Fascination in Nineteenth-Century San Francisco	Finalist	
2016	L.H. Stallings	Funk the Erotic: Transaesthetics and Black Sexual Cultures	Finalist	
2016	Aaron Goodfellow	Gay Fathers, Their Children, and the Making of Kinship	Finalist	
2016	Madhavi Menon	Indifference to Difference: On Queer Universalism	Finalist	
2016	Jane Ward	Not Gay: Sex between Straight White Men	Finalist	
2016	Petrus Liu	Queer Marxism in Two Chinas	Finalist	
2016	Valerie Traub	Thinking Sex with the Early Moderns	Finalist	
2017	Jennifer Tyburczy	Sex Museums: The Politics and Performance of Display	Winner	
2017	Qwo-Li Driskill	Asegi Stories: Cherokee Queer and Two Spirit Memory	Finalist	
2017	Gregory Woods	Homintern	Finalist	
2017	Andrew Jolivette	Indian Blood: HIV and Colonial Trauma in San Francisco's Two-Spirit Community	Finalist	
2017	Jonathan Goldberg	Melodrama: An Aesthetics of Impossibility	Finalist	
2017	Kevin Mumford	Not Straight, Not White: Black Gay Men From The March on Washington to the AIDS Crisis	Finalist	
2017	Omar G. Encarnación	Out in the Periphery: Latin America's Gay Rights Revolution	Finalist	
2017	Timothy Stewart-Winter	Queer Clout: Chicago and the Rise of Gay Politics	Finalist	
2018	Trevor Hoppe	Punishing Disease: HIV and the Criminalization of Sickness	Winner	
2018	Alfredo Mirandé	Behind the Mask	Finalist	
2018	Mari Ruti	The Ethics of Opting Out	Finalist	
2018	Emily Hobson	Lavender and Red	Finalist	
2018	Jaclyn Pryor	Time Slips	Finalist	
2018	Ashley T. Shelden	Unmaking Love	Finalist	
2018	David M. Halperin and Trevor Hoppe	The War on Sex	Finalist	
2018	Julio Capó	Welcome to Fairyland	Finalist	
2019	William T. Hoston	Toxic Silence: Race, Black Gender Identity, and Addressing the Violence Against Black Transgender Women in Houston	Winner	
2019	E. Patrick Johnson	Black. Queer. Southern. Women.: An Oral History	Finalist	
2019	Lyndon K. Gill	Erotic Islands: Art and Activism in the Queer Caribbean	Finalist	
2019	Myrl Beam	Gay, Inc.: The Nonprofitization of Queer Politics	Finalist	
2019	Keridwen N. Luis	Herlands: Exploring the Women's Land Movement in the United States	Finalist	
2019	Andrew Billings and Leigh Moscowitz	Media and the Coming Out of Gay Male Athletes in American Team Sports	Finalist	
2019	T. Jackie Cuevas	Post-Borderlandia: Chicana Literature and Gender Variant Critique	Finalist	
2019	Anne Balay	Semi Queer: Inside the World of Gay, Trans, and Black Truck Drivers	Finalist	
2020	Emily L. Thuma	All Our Trials: Prisons, Policing, and the Feminist Fight to End Violence	Winner	
2020	Robb Hernández	Archiving an Epidemic: Art, AIDS, and the Queer Chicanx Avant-Garde	Finalist	
2020	Elizabeth Freeman	Beside You in Time: Sense Methods and Queer Sociabilities in the American Nineteenth Century	Finalist	
2020	Kara Keeling	Queer Times, Black Futures	Finalist	
2020	Roberto Strongman	Queering Black Atlantic Religions: Transcorporeality in Candomblé, Santería and Vodou	Finalist	
2020	Dana Seitler	Reading Sideways: The Queer Politics of Art in Modern American Fiction	Finalist	
2020	R.L. Cagle	Scorpio Rising: A Queer Film Classic	Finalist	
2020	Jian Neo Chen	Trans Exploits: Trans of Color Cultures and Technologies in Movement	Finalist	
2021	Zakiyyah Iman Jackson	Becoming Human: Matter and Meaning in an Antiblack World	Winner	
2021	Cait McKinney	Information Activism: A Queer History of Lesbian Media Technologies	Finalist	
2021	José Esteban Muñoz	The Sense of Brown	Finalist	
2021	Janet Jakobsen	The Sex Obsession: Perversity and Possibility in American Politics	Finalist	
2021	Jane Ward	The Tragedy of Heterosexuality	Finalist	
2022	Anna Lvovsky	Vice Patrol: Cops, Courts, and the Struggle over Urban Gay Life before Stonewall	Winner	
2022	Gila Ashtor	Homo Psyche: On Queer Theory and Erotophobia	Finalist	
2022	C. Winter Han	Racial Erotics: Gay Men of Color, Sexual Racism, and the Politics of Desire	Finalist	
2022	Leah DeVun	The Shape of Sex	Finalist	
2022	Howard Chiang	Transtopia in the Sinophone Pacific	Finalist	
2023	Darieck Scott	Keeping It Unreal: Black Queer Fantasy and Superhero Comics	Winner	
2023	Mairead Sullivan	Lesbian Death: Desire and Danger between Feminist and Queer	Finalist	
2023	Marlon B. Ross	Sissy Insurgencies: A Racial Anatomy of Unfit Manliness	Finalist	
2023	Vivian L. Huang	Surface Relations: Queer Forms of Asian American Inscrutability	Finalist	
2023	Jafari S. Allen	There's a Disco Ball Between Us: A Theory of Black Gay Life	Finalist	
2024	Erin L. Durban	The Sexual Politics of Empire: Postcolonial Homophobia in Haiti	Winner	
2024	Jennifer Dominique Jones	Ambivalent Af inities: A Political History of Blackness and Homosexuality after World War II	Finalist	
2024	Christoph Hanssmann	Care without Pathology: How Trans- Health Activists Are Changing Medicine	Finalist	
2024	Margot Canaday	Queer Career: Sexuality and Work in Modern America	Finalist	
2024	Travis S. K. Kong	Sexuality and the Rise of China: The Post-1990s Gay Generation in Hong Kong, Taiwan, and Mainland China	Finalist	
2025	Susan Stryker, edited by McKenzie Wark	When Monsters Speak: A Susan Stryker Reader	Winner	
2025	Matt Fournier	Dysphoric Modernism: Using Gender in French Literature	Finalist	
2025	Clare Croft	Jill Johnston in Motion: Dance, Writing, and Lesbian Life	Finalist	
2025	Mary Zaborskis	Queer Childhoods: Institutional Futures of Indigeneity, Race, and Disability	Finalist	
2025	Matthew H. Sommer	The Fox Spirit, the Stone Maiden, and Other Transgender Histories from Late Imperial China	Finalist	
2026	Sarah Ensor	Queer Lasting: Ecologies of Care for a Dying World	Winner	
2026	Eithne Luibhéid	Abolitionist Intimacies: Queer and Trans Migrants against the Deportation State	Finalist	
2026	Iain Morland	Intersex: A Manifesto Against Medicalization	Finalist	
2026	Kareem Khubchandani, with LaWhore Vagistan	Lessons in Drag: A Queer Manual for Academics, Artists, and Aunties	Finalist	
2026	Joseph J. Fischel	Sodomy's Solicitations: A Right to Queerness	Finalist	

== See also ==
- List of LGBTQ literary awards
