= 17th Lambda Literary Awards =

2005 literary awards ceremony

The 17th Lambda Literary Awards were held in 2005 to honour works of LGBT literature published in 2004.

== Special awards ==
Category	Winner
Independent Press Award	Suspect Thoughts Press, Bella Books

== Nominees and winners ==
Category	Winner	Nominated
Anthologies/Fiction	Edmund White and Donald Weise, eds., Fresh Men: New Voices in Gay Fiction	Angela Brown, Best Lesbian Love Stories 2004; Peter Burton, Serendipity: The Gay Times Book of New Stories; Clint Catalyst and Michelle Tea, Pills, Thrills, Chills, and Heartache: Adventures in the First Person; Lori L. Lake, The Milk of Human Kindness: Lesbian Authors Write About Mothers & Daughters
Anthologies/Non-Fiction	Greg Wharton and Ian Philips, eds., I Do/I Don't: Queers on Marriage	Mary Burger, Robert Glück, Camille Roy and Gail Scott, Biting the Error: Writers Explore Narrative; Angela Brown, Mentsh: On Being Jewish and Queer; Mattilda Bernstein Sycamore, That’s Revolting!: Queer Strategies for Resisting Assimilation; Raphael Kadushin, Wonderlands
Autobiography/Memoir	Alison Smith, Name All the Animals	Jack Nichols, The Tomcat Chronicles; Ron Nyswaner, Blue Days, Black Nights; Mary Oliver, Long Life; Michelle Tea, Rent Girl
Biography	Alexis De Veaux, Warrior Poet: A Biography of Audre Lorde	Douglas Crase, Both: A Portrait in Two Parts; John F. Galliher, Wayne H. Brekhus and David P. Keys, Laud Humphreys: Prophet of Homosexuality and Sociology; Deborah Jowitt, Jerome Robbins; Evelyn C. White, Alice Walker: A Life
Children's/Young Adult	Alex Sánchez, So Hard to Say	Julie Anne Peters, Luna; Sharon Dennis Wyeth, Orphea Proud; Judy MacLean, Rosemary and Juliet; David Levithan, The Realm of Possibility
Drama	Doug Wright, I Am My Own Wife	Donald Reuter, Fabulous!; David Gere, How to Make Dances in an Epidemic; Sharon Bridgeforth, love conjure/blues; Claude J. Summers, The Queer Encyclopedia of Music, Dance and Musical Theater
Erotica	Richard Labonté, Best Gay Erotica 2005	Karin Kallmaker, All the Wrong Places; Tristan Taormino, Best Lesbian Erotica 2005; Karin Kallmaker, Therese Syzmanski, Julia Watts and Barbara Johnson, Once Upon a Dyke; Rachel Kramer Bussel and Stacy M. Bias, Up All Night: Adventures in Lesbian Sex
Gay Debut Fiction	Blair Mastbaum, Clay's Way	Damian McNicholl, A Son Called Gabriel; Aaron Krach, Half-Life; Marc Acito, How I Paid for College: A Novel of Sex, Theft, Friendship, and Musical Theater; Brian Leung, World Famous Love Acts
Gay Fiction	Colm Tóibín, The Master	Ted Wojtasik, Collage; Han Ong, The Disinherited; Derek McCormack, The Haunted Hillbilly; Alan Hollinghurst, The Line of Beauty
Gay Mystery	Anthony Bidulka, Flight of Aquavit	Greg Herren, Jackson Square Jazz; John Morgan Wilson, Moth and Flame; Gary Zebrun, Someone You Know; Dorien Grey, The Role Players
Gay Poetry	Luis Cernuda, Written in Water	D. A. Powell, Cocktails; Marvin K. White, nothin’ ugly fly; Carl Phillips, The Rest of Love; Mark Wunderlich, Voluntary Servitude
Humor	David Sedaris, Dress Your Family in Corduroy and Denim	Cheryl Peck, Fat Girls and Lawn Chairs; Greg Fox, Kyle's Bed & Breakfast; Augusten Burroughs, Magical Thinking; Michael Alvear and Vicky A. Shecter, Alexander the Fabulous
Lesbian Debut Fiction	Judith Frank, Crybaby Butch	Mary Vermillion, Death by Discount; Kristie Helms, Dish It Up, Baby!; Laurinda D. Brown, Fire & Brimstone; Bridget Bufford, Minus One: A Twelve-Step Journey
Lesbian Fiction	Stacey D'Erasmo, A Seahorse Year	Valerie Miner, Abundant Light; Emma Donoghue, Life Mask; Maggie Dubris, Skels; Susan Stinson, Venus of Chalk
Lesbian Mystery	Katherine V. Forrest, Hancock Park	Ellen Hart, An Intimate Ghost; Jennifer Jordan, Commitment to Die; Mary Vermillion, Death by Discount; Claire McNab, The Wombat Strategy
Lesbian Poetry	Beverly Burch, Sweet to Burn	Amy King, Antidotes for an Alibi; Carol Guess, Femme’s Dictionary; Adrienne Rich, The School Among the Ruins; Mary Oliver, Why I Wake Early
LGBT Studies	Elisabeth Kirtsoglou, For the Love of Women: Gender, Identity and Same-Sex Relations in a Greek Provincial Town	Andrea Barnet, All-Night Party; Will Fellows, A Passion to Preserve; Abigail Garner, Families Like Mine; Evan Wolfson, Why Marriage Matters
Photography/Visual Arts	Evan Bachner and Harry Abrams, At Ease: Navy Men of World War II	Thomas Waugh, Lust Unearthed; Jenni Olson, The Queer Movie Poster Book; Michelle Tea and Laurenn McCubbin, Rent Girl; Claude J. Summers, The Queer Encyclopedia of the Visual Arts
Romance	Steve Kluger, Almost Like Being in Love	Karin Kallmaker, All the Wrong Places; Chris Kenry, Confessions of a Casanova; Gerri Hill, Gulf Breeze; Marianne Martin, Under the Witness Tree
Religion/Spirituality	Will Roscoe, Jesus and the Shamanic Tradition of Same-Sex Love	Randy Conner and David Hatfield Sparks, Queering Creole Spiritual Traditions; Marvin M. Ellison, Same-Sex Marriage: A Christian Ethical Analysis; Donald L. Boisvert, Sanctity and Male Desire; Steven Greenberg, Wrestling with God & Men
Science fiction, fantasy or horror	Jim Grimsley, The Ordinary	Michael Jensen, Firelands; Greg Herren, Shadows of the Night: Queer Tales of the Uncanny and Unusual; Jean Stewart, The Wizard of Isis; Nicola Griffith, With Her Body
Transgender	Mariette Pathy Allen, The Gender Frontier	Jamison Green, Becoming a Visible Man; Morty Diamond, From the Inside Out: Radical Gender Transformation, FTM and Beyond; Julie Anne Peters, Luna; Helen Boyd, My Husband Betty: Love, Sex and Life with a Crossdresser
