= 27th Lambda Literary Awards =

2015 literary awards ceremony

The 27th Lambda Literary Awards were held on June 1, 2015, to honour works of LGBT literature published in 2014. The list of nominees was released on March 4.

The ceremony was held at Cooper Union.

== Special awards ==
Category	Winner
Pioneer Award	Rita Mae Brown
Betty Berzon Emerging Writer Award	Anne Balay, Daisy Hernández
Trustee Award	John Waters

== Nominees and winners ==
Category	Winner	Nominated
Bisexual Fiction	Ana Castillo, Give It to Me	Sheela Lambert, Best Bi Short Stories: Bisexual Fiction; Ron Suresha, Extraordinary Adventures of Mullah Nasruddin; Susie Hara, Finder of Lost Objects; Vivek Shraya, She of the Mountains
Bisexual Non-Fiction	Charles M. Blow, Fire Shut Up in My Bones	Alan Cumming, Not My Father’s Son; Robyn Ochs and H. Sharif Williams, Recognize: The Voices of Bisexual Men
Gay Erotica	Tiffany Reisz, The King	Jerry Wheeler, Bears of Winter; Hushicho, Incubus Tales; Raven Kaldera, Leather Spirit Stallion; William Holden, The Thief Taker
Gay Fiction	Tom Spanbauer, I Loved You More	Judith Frank, All I Love and Know; Christos Tsiolkas, Barracuda; Tatamkhulu Afrika, Bitter Eden; Michael Nava, The City of Palaces; Michael Carroll, Little Reef and Other Stories; Keith Banner, Next to Nothing; John R. Gordon, Souljah
Gay Memoir/Biography	Richard Blanco, The Prince of Los Cocuyos; John Lahr, Tennessee Williams: Mad Pilgrimage of the Flesh	Sean Strub, Body Counts: A Memoir of Politics, Sex, AIDS, and Survival; Brent Phillips, Charles Walters: The Director Who Made Hollywood Dance; Rob Smith, Closets, Combat and Coming Out: Coming of Age as a Gay Man in the “Don’t Ask, Don’t Tell” Army; Edmund White, Inside a Pearl: My Years in Paris; Alain Mabanckou, Letter to Jimmy; Philip Gefter, Wagstaff: Before and After Mapplethorpe
Gay Mystery	Katie Gilmartin, Blackmail, My Love	Marshall Thornton, Boystown 6: From the Ashes; David Swatling, Calvin’s Head; David Lennon, DeadFall; Josh Lanyon, Fair Game; Jameson Currier, A Gathering Storm; Janice Law, Moon Over Tangier; Rafe Haze, The Next
Gay Poetry	Danez Smith, [insert] boy	David J. Daniels, Clean; Timothy Liu, Don’t Go Back to Sleep; C. A. Conrad, ECODEVIANCE: (Soma)tics for the Future Wilderness; Jericho Brown, The New Testament; Saeed Jones, Prelude to Bruise; Michael Broder, This Life Now; Hieu Minh Nguyen, This Way to the Sugar
Gay Romance	Jeff Mann, Salvation: A Novel of the Civil War	Lloyd A. Meeker, The Companion; Barry Lowe, Everything’s Coming Up Roses: Four Tales of M/M Romance; Timothy Lambert and R. D. Cochrane, Foolish Hearts: New Gay Fiction; Georgina Li, Like They Always Been Free; Jim Provenzano, Message of Love; David Reddish, The Passion of Sergius & Bacchus; L. C. Chase, Pulling Leather
Lesbian Erotica	Diana Cage, Lesbian Sex Bible	Andi Marquette and R. G. Emanuelle, All You Can Eat. A Buffet of Lesbian Erotica and Romance; Cheyenne Blue, Forbidden Fruit: stories of unwise lesbian desire
Lesbian Fiction	Alexis De Veaux, Yabo	Ann-Marie MacDonald, Adult Onset; Qiu Miaojin, Last Words of Montmartre; Francine Prose, Lovers at the Chameleon Club, Paris 1932; M. B. Caschetta, Miracle Girls; Shelly Oria, New York 1, Tel Aviv 0; Brandy T. Wilson, The Palace Blues; Sarah Waters, The Paying Guests
Lesbian Memoir/Biography	Alethia Jones, Virginia Eubanks and Barbara Smith, Ain’t Gonna Let Nobody Turn Me Around: Forty Years of Movement Building	Lynette Loeppky, Cease – a memoir of love, loss and desire; Kelly Cogswell, Eating Fire: My Life as a Lesbian Avenger; Ariel Gore, The End of Eve; Terry Mutchler, Under This Beautiful Dome: A Senator, A Journalist, and the Politics of Gay Love in America
Lesbian Mystery	Ellen Hart, The Old Deep and Dark	Anne Laughlin, The Acquittal; Charles Atkins, Done to Death; Valerie Bronwen, Slash and Burn; Stevie Mikayne, UnCatholic Conduct
Lesbian Poetry	Valerie Wetlaufer, Mysterious Acts by My People	Lenelle Moïse, Haiti Glass; Rachel Zolf, Janey’s Arcadia; Meg Day, Last Psalm at Sea Level; Ellen Bass, Like a Beggar; Sina Queyras, MxT; Megan Volpert, Only Ride; Susanna Mishler, Termination Dust
Lesbian Romance	Robbi McCoy, The Farmer’s Daughter	Kate McLachlan, Christmas Crush; Lisa Girolami, The Heat of Angels; Kris Bryant, Jolt; Andrea Bramhall, Nightingale; Jesse J. Thoma, Seneca Falls; Marianne K. Martin, Tangled Roots; Clare Ashton, That Certain Something
LGBT Anthology	Leila J. Rupp and Susan K. Freeman, Understanding and Teaching US Lesbian, Gay, Bisexual, and Transgender History	Charles Stephens and Steven G. Fullwood, Black Gay Genius: Answering Joseph Beam’s Call; Bruce Gillespie, A Family by Any Other Name: Exploring Queer Relationships; Mark McNease and Stephen Dolainski, Outer Voices Inner Lives; Douglas Ray, The Queer South: LGBTQ Writers on the American South
LGBT Children's/Young Adult	Tim Federle, Five, Six, Seven, Nate!	Susan Kuklin, Beyond Magenta: Transgender Teens Speak Out; Bridget Birdsall, Double Exposure; Karelia Stetz-Waters, Forgive Me If I’ve Told You This Before; Robin Talley, Lies We Tell Ourselves; Jay Jordan Hawke, Pukawiss the Outcast; Suki Fleet, This is Not a Love Story; Raziel Reid, When Everything Feels Like the Movies
LGBT Debut Fiction	Abdi Nazemian, The Walk-In Closet	Vinton Rafe McCabe, Death in Venice, California; Megan Milks, Kill Marguerite and Other Stories; Elizabeth Earley, A Map of Everything; Bob Sennett, The Music Teacher; Dia Felix, Nochita; Dan Lopez, Part the Hawser, Limn the Sea; Alden Jones, Unaccompanied Minors
LGBT Drama	Robert O'Hara, Bootycandy	Adelina Anthony, The Beast of Times; Daniel Pearle, A Kid Like Jake; Samuel D. Hunter, The Whale; Steve Yockey, Wolves
LGBT Graphic Novel	Joyce Brabner and Mark Zingarelli, Second Avenue Caper	Elisha Lim, 100 Crushes; Kathleen Jacques, Band Vs. Band Comix Volume 1; A. K. Summers, Pregnant Butch: Nine Long Months Spent in Drag; Nick Sumida, Snackies
LGBT Non-Fiction	Martin Duberman, Hold Tight Gently: Michael Callen, Essex Hemphill, and the Battlefield of AIDS	Lee Lynch, An American Queer: The Amazon Trail; Julie Sondra Decker, The Invisible Orientation: An Introduction to Asexuality; Rebecca J. Anderson, Nevirapine and the Quest to End Pediatric AIDS; Hilton Als, Ann Temkin, Claudia Carson, Robert Gober, Paulina Pobocha and Christian Scheidemann, Robert Gober: The Heart Is Not a Metaphor; Robert Hofler, Sexplosion: From Andy Warhol to A Clockwork Orange, How a Generation of Pop Rebels Broke All the Taboos; Aaron Devor, The Transgender Archives: Foundations for the Future; Clayton Delery-Edwards, The Up Stairs Lounge Arson: Thirty-Two Deaths in a New Orleans Gay Bar, June 24, 1973
LGBT Science Fiction/Fantasy/Horror	Chaz Brenchley, Bitter Waters	Daryl Gregory, Afterparty; Lee Thomas, Butcher’s Road; A. M. Dellamonica, Child of a Hidden Sea; Max Gladstone, Full Fathom Five; Lea Daley, FutureDyke; Craig Laurance Gidney, Skin Deep Magic
LGBT Studies	Vincent Woodard, Justin A. Joyce and Dwight McBride, The Delectable Negro: Human Consumption and Homoeroticism within US Slave Culture	Noelle M. Stout, After Love: Queer Intimacy and Erotic Economies in Post-Soviet Cuba; Rachel Hope Cleves, Charity & Sylvia: A Same-Sex Marriage in Early America; Marcia Ochoa, Queen for a Day: Transformistas, Beauty Queens, and the Performance of Femininity in Venezuela; Lisa Tatonetti, The Queerness of Native American Literature; Juana Maria Rodriguez, Sexual Futures, Queer Gestures, and Other Latina Longings; Susan S. Lanser, The Sexuality of History: Modernity and the Sapphic; Bobby Benedicto, Under Bright Lights: Gay Manila and the Global Scene
Transgender Fiction	Casey Plett, A Safe Girl to Love	La JohnJoseph, Everything Must Go; Kim Fu, For Today I Am a Boy; Shani Mootoo, Moving Forward Sideways Like a Crab; Alex Myers, Revolutionary
Transgender Non-Fiction	Thomas Page McBee, Man Alive: A True Story of Violence, Forgiveness and Becoming a Man	Janet Mock, Redefining Realness: My Path to Womanhood, Identity, Love and So Much More; Laura Erickson-Schroth, Trans Bodies, Trans Selves: A Resource for the Transgender Community
