= Jodi Dean =

American political theorist (born 1962)

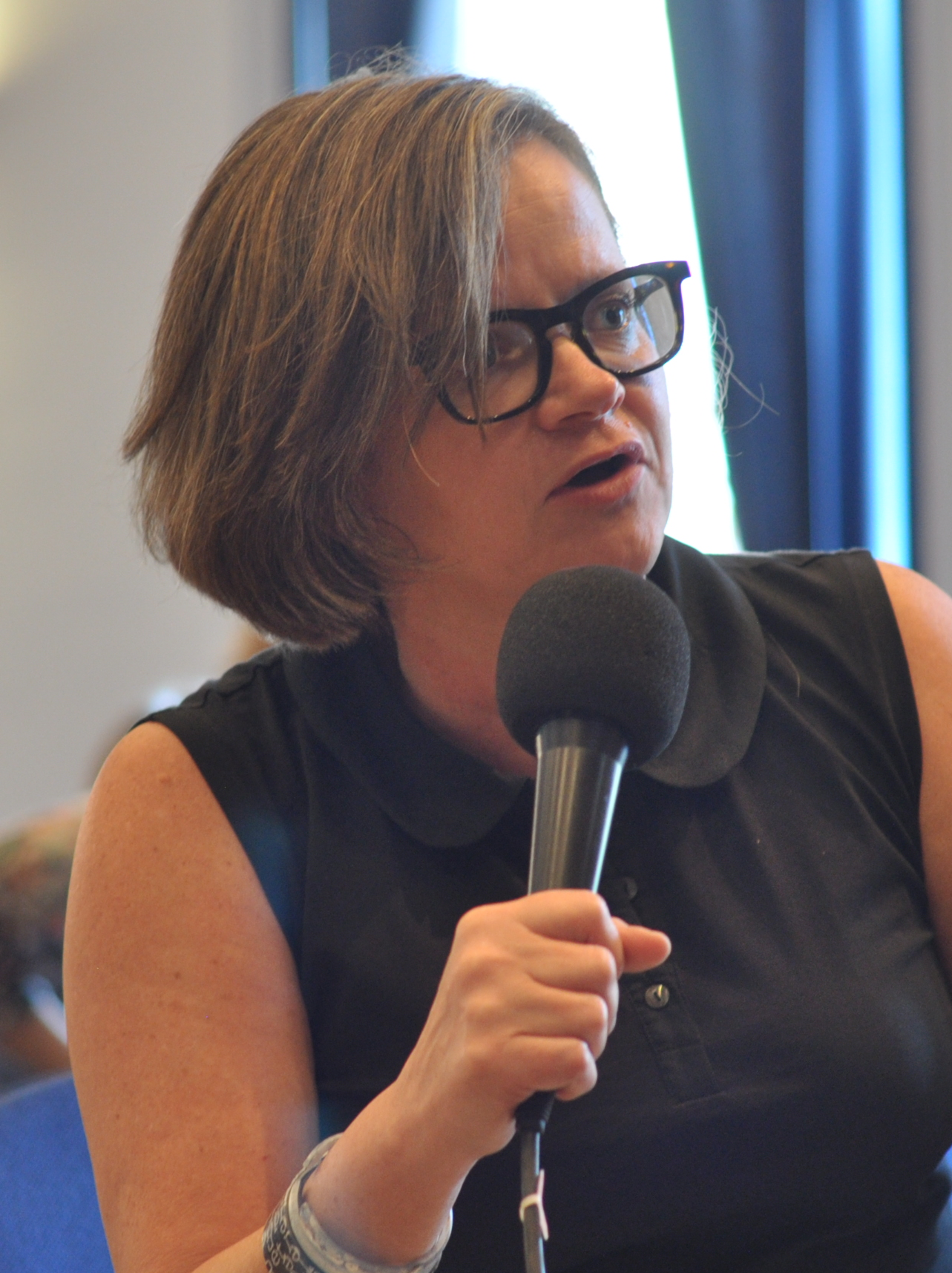
- Dean in 2017
- Born: 1962 (age 63–64)

Education
- Education: Princeton University (BA); Columbia University (MA, MPhil, PhD)

Philosophical work
- School: Marxism, psychoanalysis, postmodernism
- Institutions: Hobart and William Smith Colleges

Jodi Dean (born 1962) is an American political theorist and professor in the political science department at Hobart and William Smith Colleges in New York state. She held the Donald R. Harter '39 Professorship of the Humanities and Social Sciences from 2013 to 2018. Dean has also held the position of Erasmus Professor of the Humanities in the Faculty of Philosophy at Erasmus University Rotterdam. She is the author and editor of thirteen books, including Comrade: An Essay on Political Belonging (Verso 2019).

== Career ==
Dean received a B.A. from Princeton University in 1984. She received a M.A. and a PhD from Columbia University.

In 1993, Dean joined the faculty of Hobart and William Smith Colleges. From 2013 to 2018, she held the Donald R. Harter ’39 Professorship of the Humanities and Social Sciences. Dean has taught courses on feminist theory, political theory, critical studies, and communism. Dean is also the Erasmus Professor in Philosophy at Erasmus University Rotterdam.

Dean was formerly a co-editor of the journal Theory and Event. Dean has additionally held fellowships at Birkbeck (University of London), Cardiff University, Cornell University, McGill University, and the Institute for Human Sciences.

On April 13, 2024, Hobart and William Smith Colleges president Mark Gearan issued a statement announcing that Dean had been "relieved of classroom duties" following an essay she wrote for Verso Books, in which "she spoke about feeling exhilarated and energized by the paragliders on October 7" and called the attacks "acts of bravery and defiance". In a posting to the social media website X, Dean confirmed she had been relieved of teaching responsibilities. The suspension was lifted in July 2024.

Dean is a member of the American Political Science Association, the Association for the Study of Law, Culture, and the Humanities, and the Law and Society Association. She is on the council of Progressive International.

== Work ==
Emphasizing the use of Leninism, psychoanalysis, and certain postmodernist theories, Dean has made contributions to political theory, media studies and third-wave feminism, most notably with her theory of communicative capitalism—the online merging of democracy and capitalism into a single neoliberal formation that subverts the democratic impulses of the masses by valuing emotional expression over logical discourse.

== The Communist Horizon ==
In the first few chapters of her 2012 book The Communist Horizon, Dean surveys the contemporary political landscape, noting the persistence of anti-communist rhetoric more than twenty-five years after the fall of the Berlin Wall. She says that capitalists, conservatives, liberals, and social democrats all agree that 20th-century communist regimes were unqualified failures, thereby limiting the scope of discussion around political alternatives to liberal democracy and free markets, a fusion of which constitutes Dean's conception of neoliberalism. She asserts that when people think of capitalism they do not consider what she believes are its worst results (unemployment, economic inequality, hyperinflation, climate change, robber barons, the Great Depression, and the Great Recession) because the history of capitalism is viewed as dynamic and nuanced. By contrast, Dean writes that the history of communism is not considered dynamic or nuanced. Instead, there is a fixed historical narrative of communism that emphasizes authoritarianism, the gulag, starvation, and violence.

First, Dean holds that communism is widely viewed as interchangeable with the Soviet Union, an association that fails to acknowledge the diversity of communist experiments in Eastern Europe, Asia, Africa, or Latin America are often given little attention. Second, Dean asserts that the seventy-year history of the Soviet Union is condensed to the twenty-six years of Joseph Stalin's rule. Third, Dean critiques the reduction of communism to Stalinist violence and repression, highlighting the modernization and industrialization of the Soviet economy, the successes of the Soviet space program, and improving overall standards of living in the formerly agrarian economy. Fourth, Dean holds that public discourse on the collapse of the Soviet Union in 1991 oversimplify communism as a failed authoritarian project, reinforcing Cold War binaries and stifling discussions of communism as a viable alternative to capitalism. Lastly, Dean contends that the association of communism with Stalinism and authoritarianism is used to dismiss the possibility of communism working in practice by implying that any challenge to the political status quo will inevitably result in purges and violence.

== Bibliography ==
=== Books ===
- Solidarity of Strangers: Feminism after Identity Politics (University of California Press 1996)
- Feminism and the New Democracy: Resisting the Political (editor, Sage 1997)
- Aliens in America: Conspiracy Cultures from Outerspace to Cyberspace (Cornell University Press 1998)
- Political Theory and Cultural Studies (editor, Cornell University Press 2000)
- Publicity's Secret: How Technoculture Capitalizes on Democracy (Cornell University Press 2002)
- Empire's New Clothes: Reading Hardt and Negri (co-editor with Paul A. Passavant, Routledge 2004)
- Žižek's Politics (Routledge 2006)
- Reformatting Politics: Information Technology and Global Civil Society (co-editor with Geert Lovink and Jon Anderson, Routledge 2006)
- Democracy and Other Neoliberal Fantasies (Duke University Press 2009)
- Blog Theory (Cambridge: Polity Press, 2010) ISBN 9780745649702
- The Communist Horizon (London & New York: Verso Books, 2012) ISBN 9781786635525
- Crowds and Party (London & New York: Verso Books, 2016) ISBN 9781781687062
- Comrade – An Essay on Political Belonging (London & New York: Verso Books, 2019) ISBN 9781788735018
- Organize, Fight, Win: Black Communist Women’s Political Writing, edited by Jodi Dean and Charisse Burden-Stelly (London & New York: Verso Books, 2022) ISBN 9781839764974
- Capital's Grave: Neofeudalism and the New Class Struggle (London & New York: Verso Books, 2025) ISBN 9781804295199

=== Lectures ===
- Jodi Dean (June 29, 2013). "The Limits of the Web in an Age of Communicative Capitalism". Public lecture in Dublin in June 2013.
- Jodi Dean (July 2, 2013). "Complexity as Capture: Neoliberalism and Communicative Capitalism". Public lecture at the University of York in July 2013.
- Jodi Dean (January 17, 2015). "Communicative capitalism and the challenge for the left". Rosa-Luxemburg-Stiftung. January 2015.
- Jodi Dean (June 10, 2015). "Jodi Dean – The Communist Horizon". Public lecture in Belgrade at the Institute for Philosophy and Social Theory and the Institut Français de Serbie in cooperation with the Center for Ethics, Law and Applied Philosophy (CELAP), Center for Advanced Studies in Southeastern Europe (CAS – SEE) and the Faculty of Media and Communications in Belgrade (FMK).
- Jodi Dean (February 23, 2019) "Communism or Feudalism?" Sonic Acts Festival, De Brakke Grond, Amsterdam, the Netherlands
- Jodi Dean, (April 9, 2020) "The New Intellectuals: Comrade." The People's Forum of NYC

=== Articles ===
- Jodi Dean (February 13, 2019). The Actuality of Revolution. The Hampton Institute.
- Jodi Dean, "Same As It Ever Was?" in New Left Review Sidecar (May 6, 2022)
- Jodi Dean "Politics is Missing." Boston Review, September 19, 2023
