= Belton High School =

Belton High School may refer to:

- Belton High School (Missouri), located in Belton, Missouri
- Belton High School (Texas), located in Belton, Texas
- Belton-Honea Path High School, located in Honea Path, South Carolina
