= Sex and Harm in the Age of Consent =

Book 2016

- Cover of the 2016 Univ Of Minnesota Press edition
- Author: Joseph J. Fischel
- Language: English
- Publisher: University of Minnesota Press
- Publication date: 2016
- Dewey Decimal: 345.730253
- LC Class: KF9325 .F57

Sex and Harm in the Age of Consent is a 2016 sociology book by Joseph J. Fischel.
