= Joseph Fischel =

Scholar in women, gender, and sexuality studies

Academic background
- Education: Wesleyan University (BA, 2004); University of Chicago (MA, 2007; PhD, 2011); Yale University (ML, 2021)

Academic work
- Discipline: Women, Gender, and Sexuality Studies
- Institutions: Yale University

Joseph J. Fischel is an academic in the field of Women, Gender, and Sexuality Studies whose research explores social and sexual justice. He is the author of Sex and Harm in the Age of Consent (2016), Screw Consent (2019), and Sodomy's Solicitations (2025). He is also the co-editor of Enticements (2024). As of 2026, Fischel is a professor at Yale University.

== Education ==
Fischel earned a Bachelor of Arts in government from Wesleyan University in 2004, after which he attended the University of Chicago, earning a Master of Arts in political science in 2007, following by a Doctor of Philosophy in political science in 2011. In 2021, Fischel earned a Master of Studies in Law from Yale University.

Fischel's doctoral dissertation was adapted and published as Sex and Harm in the Age of Consent. The dissertation earned the Association for the Study of Law, Culture and the Humanities's Julian Mezey Best Dissertation Award.

== Research ==
Fischel's research in women, gender, and sexuality studies explores social and sexual justice. He is the author of three books and co-editor of one.

Fischel's first book, Sex and Harm in the Age of Consent, was published by the University of Minnesota Press in 2016. In the book, Fischel examines the concept of sexual consent, arguing that through representations in United States law and media, consent is "a moralized fiction". Drawing from various theoretical backgrounds, Fischel argues that law should shift its "focus on innocence and capacity to vulnerability and dependence, and from consent to sexual autonomy". Political Theory's Jennifer C. Nash found the book "deeply compelling", whereas Carole Pateman, writing for The Journal of Politics, stated that the book does not provide "not easy reading, with dense prose, unusual locutions (e.g., anxiogenic), and very detailed discussions". Sex and Harm in the Age of Consent won the American Political Science Association's 2017 Foundations in Political Theory First Book Award.

Screw Consent: A Better Politics of Sexual Justice, published by the University of California Press in 2019, expands on Fischel's arguments regarding consent, focusing on "how a sexual politics focused on consent can often obscure, rather than clarify, what is wrong about wrongful sex". As Laurie Schaffner explains, the book "does not argue to "screw" [consent] (in the sense of throw out the idea of consent) but to "screw" it in tighter—add to it other measures of sexual autonomy, access, and dignity in the configuration of a politics of sexual justice".

In 2024, New York University Press published Enticements: Queer Legal Studies, which Fischel co-edited with Canadian jurist and scholar Brenda Cossman. The collection, which focuses on "the regulation of sex, gender, sexuality, reproduction, and family", is separated into four parts: "Queer Fictions or, Rewriting Gay Rights", "Queer Figures", "Policed Men", and "Queer Feels".

Fischel's most recent book, Sodomy's Solicitations: A Right to Queerness, was published by Temple University Press in 2025. The book examines anti-sodomy laws and argues how such laws impact societal harm beyond homophobia and transphobia. Sodomy's Solicitations is a finalist for the 2026 Lambda Literary Award for LGBTQ+ Studies.

== Books ==
- Fischel, Joseph (2016). Sex and Harm in the Age of Consent. University of Minnesota Press. ISBN 978-1-452-95159-1.
- Fischel, Joseph (2019). Screw Consent: A Better Politics of Sexual Justice. University of California Press. ISBN 978-0-520-29540-7.
- Fischel, Joseph J.; Cossman, Brenda, eds. (2024). Enticements: Queer Legal Studies. NYU Press. ISBN 978-1-479-80759-8.
- Fischel, Joseph (2025). Sodomy's Solicitations: A Right to Queerness. Temple University Press. ISBN 978-1-439-91584-4.
