= Jafari S. Allen =

Scholar of African American and African Diaspora studies

Academic background
- Education: Morehouse College (1990); New York University (1998); Columbia University (PhD, 2003)

Academic work
- Discipline: African American and African Diaspora studies
- Institutions: Columbia University

Jafari Sinclaire Allen is a scholar in the field of African American and African Diaspora studies, with research interests in gender and sexuality, social movements, social networks, and social stratification. As of 2026, he is a professor at Columbia University, as well as the director of the Institute for Research in African American Studies and editor-in-chief of Souls: A Critical Journal of Black Politics, Society, and Culture.

== Education ==
Allen attended New York City Public Schools, graduating from Springfield Gardens High School in 1986. He then received degrees from Morehouse College (1990) and New York University (1998) before earning a Doctor of Philosophy in socio-cultural anthropology from Columbia University (2003).

== Research ==
Allen's research interests include gender and sexuality, social movements, social networks, and social stratification. Among other works, Allen has published two books: ¡Venceremos?: The Erotics of Black Self-making in Cuba (2011) and There's a Disco Ball Between Us: A Theory of Black Gay Life (2022).

Allen's debut book, ¡Venceremos?, was published by Duke University Press in 2011. The title references the slogan ¡Venceremos! (We shall overcome!) that arose during the Cuban Revolution. Despite calls for equality, many groups were still discriminated against. ¡Venceremos? provides an "ethnography on race, desire, and belonging among blacks in early-twenty-first-century Cuba", with Allen focusing on the late 1990s to the early 2000s. According to Noelle M. Stout, writing for New West Indian Guide, "One of the most significant contributions of ¡Venceremos? is its application of intersectionality [...] to lived experience", which "shapes each chapter, as multiple themes and historical eras crisscross throughout". ¡Venceremos? was a finalist for the 2012 Lambda Literary Award for LGBTQ+ Studies.

Allen's second book, There's a Disco Ball Between Us, was published by Duke University Press in 2022. Across three sections that use a mix of historiography, (auto)ethnography, and media analysis, the book explores what Allen refers to as "Black gay habits of mind", while highlighting "the specificity of Black sexualities as well as their similarities across diaspora". According to Baird Campbell, the book "is a sometimes disorienting journey across time-space, bringing together the experiences and histories of Black gay men across North and South America, the Caribbean, East Africa, and Europe". Despite this disorientation, Campbell concluded that "Allen has skillfully woven together the experiences of an 'anthologized generation' without falling into the trap of eliding them". There's a Disco Ball Between Us was a finalist for the 2023 Lambda Literary Award for LGBTQ+ Studies.

== Publications ==
- ¡Venceremos?: The Erotics of Black Self-making in Cuba. Duke University Press. 2011. doi:10.1215/9780822393801. ISBN 978-0-8223-9380-1.
- There's a Disco Ball Between Us: A Theory of Black Gay Life. Duke University Press. 2022. doi:10.2307/j.ctv23985hj. ISBN 978-1-4780-2189-6.
