= Kyle's Bed & Breakfast =

American comic strip by Greg Fox

- Author: Greg Fox
- Website: kylesbnb.blogspot.com
- Current status/schedule: Current bimonthly strip
- Launch date: November 1998; 28 years ago
- Publisher: Genre magazine
- Genre(s): Soap Opera, Gay life

Kyle's Bed & Breakfast is a syndicated comic strip by Greg Fox. The setting is a gay bed & breakfast in the town of Northport, New York, on Long Island. It features a diverse cast of regularly appearing characters, and guests who contribute to the humor and drama. It premiered in November 1998, and is ongoing as of October 2023. It has addressed a range of serious topics, including gays in professional sports, gay parenting, racism, gay marriage, gays in the priesthood, AIDS, "body fascism", 9/11, people with disabilities, "straight-acting", conversion therapy, family rejection, and the struggles of married, closeted gay men.

== History ==
Originally running in Genre magazine, the strip expanded to run in many gay and lesbian publications across North America, including the Washington Blade, Philadelphia Gay News, the Dallas Voice, Out New Jersey and many others.

The strip has been collected into several paperback editions. The first, published in September 2004, contains the first five years of the comic strip in one volume, as well as never-before published strips. The strip was a finalist for the Lambda Literary Award for Best Humor Book at the 2005 Lambda Literary Awards. Three more collections have since been published.

== Publications ==
- Fox, Greg (2004), Kyle's Bed & Breakfast, Kensington Publishing Corporation, ISBN 0-7582-0693-3
- Fox, Greg (2012), Kyle's Bed & Breakfast: A Second Bowl of Serial, Sugar Maple Press, ISBN 978-0-615-62705-2
- Fox, Greg (2013), Kyle's Bed & Breakfast: Hot Off the Griddle, Sugar Maple Press, ISBN 978-0-615-86396-2
- Fox, Greg (2015), Kyle's Bed & Breakfast: Without Reservations, Sugar Maple Press, ISBN 978-0-692-55136-3
- Fox, Greg (2018), Kyle's Bed & Breakfast: Inn Mates, Sugar Maple Press, ISBN 978-0-999-59841-2
