= Law, Culture and the Humanities =

- Discipline: Humanities
- Language: English
- Edited by: Austin Sarat

Publication details
- History: 2005-present
- Publisher: SAGE Publications on behalf of the Association for the Study of Law, Culture and the Humanities
- Frequency: Triannually

Standard abbreviations
- ISO 4: Law Cult. Humanit.

Indexing
- ISSN: 1743-8721 (print); 1743-9752 (web)
- LCCN: 2005256014
- OCLC no.: 648971733

Links
- Journal homepage; Online access; Online archive

Law, Culture and the Humanities is a peer-reviewed academic journal that publishes papers three times a year in the field of humanities. The journal's editor-in-chief is Austin Sarat (Amherst College). It was established in 2005 and is currently published by SAGE Publications on behalf of the Association for the Study of Law, Culture and the Humanities. The journal covers legal history, legal theory and jurisprudence, law and cultural studies, law and literature, and legal hermeneutics.

== Abstracting and indexing ==
Law, Culture and the Humanities is abstracted and indexed in International Bibliography of the Social Sciences and Scopus.
