= Betty Berzon =

American author and psychotherapist (1928–2006)

- Born: January 18, 1928; St. Louis, Missouri
- Died: January 24, 2006 (aged 78); Studio City, California
- Occupations: Psychotherapist, activist, writer

Betty Berzon (January 18, 1928 – January 24, 2006) was an American author and psychotherapist known for her work with the gay and lesbian communities.

== Biography ==
Berzon was born in St. Louis, Missouri, to a Jewish family. She was among the first psychotherapists to assist gay clients. After coming out as gay in 1968, she began providing therapy to gays and lesbians. In 1971, during a UCLA conference called "The Homosexual in America," Berzon became the first psychotherapist in the country to come out as gay to the public. Also in 1971, she organized the Los Angeles Gay and Lesbian Community Services Center as well as an organization of gays and lesbians within the American Psychiatric Association (the Gay Psychological Association, now known as the Society for the Psychological Study of Lesbian, Gay, Bisexual and Transgender Issues); the APA declassified homosexuality as a mental illness two years later. She was an architect and founder of Southern California Women for Understanding and a co-founder for the California Gay Academic Union.

Berzon temporarily attended Stanford University before enrolling in UCLA in 1952 and graduating in 1957. She then obtained her master's degree from San Diego State University in 1962.

In 1976, Berzon and her partner Teresa DeCrescenzo were among the eight founding members of the Western Gay Academic Union. Berzon later became president of the national Gay Academic Union.

Berzon also served on the boards of many gay organizations, including the LA Gay and Lesbian Center (1972–1975), the Whtman-Radclyffe Foundation (1976–1977), the Gay Academic Union (1977–1979), the National Gay Rights Advocates (1979–1984), and the Gay and Lesbian Adolescent Social Services (1984–1994).

== Death and legacy ==
Berzon was diagnosed with breast cancer in 1986. She was treated by mastectomy and her cancer remained in remission for many years. The cancer returned in 2001, and Berzon died peacefully in her sleep on January 24, 2006. She is survived by Teresa DeCrescenzo, the president of Gay and Lesbian Adolescent Social Services, whom Berzon met in 1973 and married during a mass wedding ceremony at the 1993 March on Washington.

In 2007, Ventura Place in Studio City was renamed Dr. Betty Berzon Place in her honor, making it the first street ever officially dedicated to a known lesbian in California.

Also in 2007, the LGBT magazine The Advocate named Berzon one of 40 "heroes."

In 2013, the Lambda Literary Foundation launched the Betty Berzon Emerging Writer Award, an award for LGBTQ writers of exceptional talent and promise who have published at least one book in any genre of literature, which was presented as part of the Lambda Literary Awards program until 2016. In 2016, the award was taken over by Publishing Triangle, which now presents it as part of the Triangle Awards.

The Betty Berzon Papers (1928–2006) are Coll2011.004 at the ONE National Gay and Lesbian Archives.

The Betty Berzon Papers (1972–1979) are Collection Number 7312 at the Division of Rare and Manuscript Collections at the Cornell University Library.

== Publications ==
Berzon's books included Positively Gay (1979), Permanent Partners (1988), and The Intimacy Dance (1996). Berzon also wrote a personal memoir, Surviving Madness, a Therapist's Own Story (2002) in which she discussed her previous suicide attempt and institutionalization. The book received the Lambda Literary Award for best lesbian memoir in 2003. For many years, she wrote an advice column on gay relationships for PlanetOut.com.
