= Anne Balay =

American labor historian

Anne Balay is an American labor historian. A former professor at Indiana University Northwest, she is best known for her oral history collections of LGBT workers: Steel Closets (2014) and Semi Queer (2018).

== Biography ==
After graduating from Wilbur Cross High School, she obtained her A.B. (1986), A.M. (1988), and PhD (1994) from the University of Chicago. After getting her degrees, she worked as a car mechanic from 1996 to 2001. She was a lecturer at the University of Illinois Chicago from 2001 to 2007 and an assistant professor at Indiana University Northwest from 2007 to 2014. In 2013, she was denied tenure at IU Northwest, and she later filed an Office for Civil Rights complaint that this action was on the basis that she was a lesbian.

In 2014, she published Steel Closets: Voices of Gay, Lesbian, and Transgender Steelworkers, a collection of oral histories from LGBT steelworkers; the oral histories had been obtained over a course of five years. The book was one of two winners of the National Women's Studies Association's 2014 Sara A. Whaley Prize. In 2015, she was one of the two winners of the Betty Berzon Emerging Writer Award at the 27th Lambda Literary Awards. The same year, Balay became a visiting assistant professor at Haverford College, working there until 2019.

In 2018, she published another book, Semi Queer: Inside the World of Gay, Trans, and Black Truck Drivers, a collection of oral histories of LGBT and Black truck drivers; Balay had spent some time working as a truck driver after failing to obtain tenure at IU Northwest. In 2019, the book was a non-winning finalist for the Lambda Literary Award for LGBT Studies at the 31st Lambda Literary Awards.

In August 2022, the Federal Motor Carrier Safety Administration announced that Balay was one of the first sixteen people appointed to its Women of Trucking Advisory Board. Balay was the only higher education organizer for Service Employees International Union Local 1 until she was laid off on January 31, 2023.

Balay has two children.

== Publications ==
- Steel Closets (2014)
- Semi Queer (2018)

== Awards ==
Year	Title	Award	Result	Ref.
2014	Steel Closets	Sara A. Whaley Prize	Won	
2015	N/A	Betty Berzon Emerging Writer Award	Won	
2019	Semi Queer	Lambda Literary Award for LGBT Studies	Nominated	
