= John Paul Brammer =

American writer

- Education: University of Oklahoma
- Occupation: Writer
- Notable work: ¡Hola Papi! How to Come Out in a Walmart Parking Lot and Other Life Lessons

John Paul Brammer is an American writer and artist. He writes the queer advice column ¡Hola Papi!, originally published in Grindr's magazine Into and subsequently via a newsletter, and is the author of the memoir: ¡Hola Papi! How to Come Out in a Walmart Parking Lot and Other Life Lessons. In 2021, he became an opinion columnist at The Washington Post.

== Early life ==
Brammer is Mexican-American and grew up in Cache, Oklahoma. He attended Lawton High School, where his mother was a teacher, then University of Oklahoma.

== Career ==
Early in his career, Brammer wrote for the Huffington Post and in 2014 he joined MSNBC. In November 2021, he joined The Washington Post as an opinion columnist, to write as well as illustrate. Brammer is also an artist, often drawing inspiration from his Mexican-American background.

In 2022, he won the Betty Berzon Emerging Writer Award.

=== Advice column ===
Brammer first pitched his advice column "¡Hola Papi!" as "queer Latino 'Dear Abby' huffing poppers". He pictured a "spoof" on the genre. Writing in Vice, Maggie Lange said, "Instead, and almost instantly after he started writing it in 2017, '¡Hola Papi!' became too meaningful, kind-hearted, and warm to read as parody." First published by Into, a magazine from the gay dating app Grindr, ¡Hola Papi! later moved to Condé Nast's LGBT magazine Them. The advice column is now published as a newsletter and is syndicated on The Cut.

=== Memoir ===
Brammer's memoir ¡Hola Papi! How to Come Out in a Walmart Parking Lot and Other Life Lessons was published by Simon & Schuster on June 1, 2021. It is a series of fourteen essays, framed as advice columns on topics like dealing with childhood trauma or life in the closet and drawing on his early life as a young gay person in a rural place. In The New York Times, Matt Wille called the book "a master class of tone and tenderness, as Brammer balances self-compassion with humor." In The Boston Globe, Gina Tomaine described the book as "a warm and funny read, and an ode to storytelling — to the possibilities it holds for both forgiving and reinventing yourself." In Axios, Marina E. Franco says Brammer also "lovingly and humorously" probes the "question of what makes us Latino 'enough'."

The memoir was optioned by Funny or Die for adaptation as a scripted series.

== Personal life ==
Brammer lives in Brooklyn, New York.
