= Alex Myers =

American writer and activist (born c.1979)

- Born: c.1979 Paris, Maine, U.S.
- Education: Harvard University Brown University (MA) Vermont College of Fine Arts
- Website: alexmyerswriting.com

Alex Myers (born c.1979) is an American author, educator and transgender rights activist.

== Early life and education ==
Myers was born in Paris, Maine. As a teenager, he attended Phillips Exeter Academy in New Hampshire. He obtained a bachelor's degree from Harvard University, where he studied near Eastern languages and civilizations. While at Harvard he worked to have gender identity added to the school's nondiscrimination clause. Myers obtained an MA in religion from Brown University. He later studied fine arts at the Vermont College of Fine Arts.

== Career ==
Myers taught English at Phillips Exeter Academy, and currently serves as the director of the Mountain School of Milton Academy.

His first book Revolutionary was released in 2014. Based on the life of Deborah Sampson, the focus of the novel is a woman who disguises herself as a man in order to fight in the American Revolutionary War. The book was a finalist for the 2015 Lambda Literary Award for Transgender Fiction.

Released in 2019, his novel Continental Divide follows Ron Bancroft who grows up as a tomboy, comes out as a teenager and travels west to find himself. In an interview with New Hampshire Public Radio Myers discussed how his own experience with transitioning was reflected in the main character Ron in his novel Continental Divide explaining: "The parallels in my own life would be a rural childhood, a feeling of always being a boy despite society telling me that I was a girl, and then going off to a more urban college experience with a bit more exposure to a range of differences."

Myers' third book The Story of Silence (2020) is a retelling of Le Roman de Silence.

== Personal life ==
Myers is a transgender man. He began transitioning in 1995 during his senior year at Phillips Exeter Academy. Having studied the first three years as a woman, he returned to campus senior year with his hair cut and requested that he be called Alex. The transition made him the first openly transgender student in the school's history.

== Publications ==
=== Novels ===
- Revolutionary (2014)
- Continental Divide (2019)
- The Story of Silence (2020)
- The Symmetry of Stars (2021)
- While We Were Silent (2026)

=== Non-fiction ===
- Supporting Transgender Students: Understanding Gender Identity and Reshaping School Culture (2021)

=== Articles ===
- Myers, Alex (May 14, 2018). "Trans Terminology Seems Like It's Changing All the Time. And That's a Good Thing". Slate Magazine.
