= Margot Canaday =

Historian

- Born: Cedar Rapids, Iowa, US
- Awards: Ellis W. Hawley Prize (2010); Lambda Literary Award for LGBTQ+ Studies (2010)

Academic background
- Education: University of Iowa (BA, 1994); University of Minnesota (MA, 1997; PhD, 2004)
- Thesis: The Straight State: Sexuality and American Citizenship, 1900-1969
- Doctoral advisor: Sara M. Evans and Barbara Young Welke

Academic work
- Discipline: History
- Sub-discipline: Modern American history; Gender and sexuality
- Institutions: Princeton University

Margot Canaday is an American historian who work focuses on gender and sexuality in the modern United States. She is the author of The Straight State (2009) and Queer Career (2023), as well as the co-editor of Intimate States (2021). As of 2026, she is Associate Chair and Dodge Professor of History at Princeton University.

== Early life and education ==
Canaday was born and raised in Cedar Rapids, Iowa. She earned a Bachelor of Arts in American studies from the University of Iowa in 1992, after which she attended the University of Minnesota, earning a Master of Arts in history in 1997 and a Doctor of Philosophy in history in 2004. Her doctoral work was completed under the supervision of Sara M. Evans and Barbara Young Welke.

Canaday's doctoral dissertation, The Straight State: Sexuality and American Citizenship, 1900-1969, was eventually published as her first book, The Straight State, in 2009. Her dissertation received the University of Minnesota Best Dissertation in the Arts and Humanities Prize, the Organization of American Historians's Lerner-Scott Prize, and the Law and Society Association's Best Dissertation Prize.

== Career ==
As of 2026, Canaday is an Associate Chair and Dodge Professor of History at Princeton University. Her research focuses on gender and sexuality in the modern United States. Among other publications, she is the author of The Straight State: Sexuality and Citizenship in Twentieth-Century America (2009) and Queer Career: Sexuality and Work in Modern America (2023), as well as the co-editor of Intimate States: Gender, Sexuality, and Governance in Modern U.S. History (2021). She is also co-editor of the Politics and Culture in Modern America series published with the University of Pennsylvania Press.

=== The Straight State (2009) ===
Canaday's first book, The Straight State: Sexuality and Citizenship in Twentieth-Century America, was published with Princeton University Press in 2009. Through social, political, and legal history, the book explores the federal regulation of homosexuality in the United States, primarily within the realms of immigration, military, and welfare. Julie Novkov, writing for Perspectives on Politics, lays out two of the book's key agendas: first, "to complicate and refine a standard account of the genesis of the American state's hostility to homosexuality in Cold War cultural anxieties" and second, "to show that the political and legal histories of the American state are inextricably infused with the politics and history of sexuality". According to Novkov, Canaday "succeeds masterfully in both agendas, contributing brilliantly both to understandings of the relationship between state practices and the construction of identity and to the story of the rise of the modern bureaucratic state as a sexual state". Kevin White, writing for the Journal of Social History, argued that "no comparable study" existed in studying the bureaucratization of and state power related to homosexuality in the United States.

The Straight State was well received by critics and won multiple awards. In 2010, it won the American Society for Legal History's Cromwell Book Prize, the American Studies Association's Lora Romero First Book Publication Prize, the American Political Science Association's Gladys M. Kammerer Award, the Organization of American Historians's Ellis W. Hawley Prize, and the Lambda Literary Award for LGBTQ+ Studies. It also received the 2011 John Boswell Prize and the Order of the Coif's 2012 Biennial Book Award.

=== Intimate States (2021) ===
Intimate States: Gender, Sexuality, and Governance in Modern U.S. History, co-edited with Nancy F. Cott and Robert Self, was published with the University of Chicago Press in 2021. Over 14 essays, the book explores the connections between American government and intimate life, ranging from the American Civil War to the modern day. The book argues to main points: first, "that the state [...] has profoundly structured those realms of desire, sexual practice, and domestic life sometimes imagined to stand outside state power; and second, that the work of American governance cannot be understood without accounting for the regulation of gender and sexuality, not as a corollary to but as a key engine of state-building since the Civil War". According to Anna Lvovsky, writing for the Journal of the History of Sexuality, "Intimate States is an essential and illuminating lens on the many insights to be gleaned from the history of intimate regulation".

=== Queer Career (2023) ===
Queer Career: Sexuality and Work in Modern America was published with Princeton University Press in 2023. Building from Canaday's earlier work, the book uses oral history and archival methodologies to explore how workplace discrimination and legislation have shaped queer life in the United States from post-World War II to the 1990s. The book is separated into three parts: "Gay Labor", "Law and Liberation", and "Civil Rights in a Neoliberal Age", with each section exploring how queer workers have been more easily exploited as they could easily be fired, and they were often underpaid because they supposedly didn't have dependents to support. In the "Gay Labor" section, Canaday discusses identity politics and "how the queerness of workers oriented their careers", while the "Law and Liberation" section "details the unsuccessful campaign to end discrimination in public-sector employment in the 1970s". Lastly, the "Civil Rights in a Neoliberal Age" section "examines the AIDS epidemic and the rights granted for queers in the corporate sector".

Queer Career won the Labor and Working-Class History Association's Philip Taft Prize in Labor History and was a finalist for the Association of American Publishers's PROSE Award in North American and US History, as well as the Lambda Literary Award for LGBTQ+ Studies. The Chronicle of Higher Education also named it one of the best scholarly books of 2023.

== Books ==
- Canaday, Margot (2009). The Straight State: Sexuality and Citizenship in Twentieth-Century America. Politics and Society in Modern America. Princeton University Press. ISBN 978-0-691-14993-6.
- Canaday, Margot; Cott, Nancy F.; Self, Robert O., eds. (2021). Intimate States: Gender, Sexuality, and Governance in Modern US History. University of Chicago Press. ISBN 978-0-226-79475-4.
- Canaday, Margot (2023). Queer Career: Sexuality and Work in Modern America. Princeton University Press. ISBN 978-0-691-21530-3.
