= Marlon B. Ross =

American academic

Academic background
- Education: Southwestern University (BA, 1978); University of Chicago (MA, 1979; PhD, 1983)

Academic work
- Discipline: English; American Studies
- Sub-discipline: African-American literature; Gender and sexuality studies; Romanticism
- Institutions: University of Virginia

Marlon B. Ross is an academic in the fields of English literature and American studies. He specializes in African-American literature, Romanticism and gender and sexuality studies. He is the author of The Contours of Masculine Desire (1989), Manning the Race (2004) and Sissy Insurgencies (2022). As of 2026, Ross is a professor of English and American Studies at the University of Virginia.

== Education ==
Ross earned a Bachelor of Arts from Southwestern University in 1978, after which he attended the University of Chicago, earning a Master of Arts in 1979 and a Doctor of Philosophy in 1983.

== Writing ==
Ross's first book, The Contours of Masculine Desire: Romanticism and the Rise of Women's Poetry, was published by Oxford University Press in 1989. The book explores the role of gender in poetry in Britain from 1730 to 1830, focusing on romanticism and the rise of women's poetry. Poets discussed in the book include William Wordsworth, Samuel Taylor Coleridge, John Keats, Percy Bysshe Shelley, Lady Mary Wortley Montagu, Anna Laetitia Barbauld, Hannah More, Felicia Hemans, and Letitia Elizabeth Landon.

Ross's second book, Manning the Race: Reforming Black Men in the Jim Crow Era, was published by New York Press in 2004. The book explores narratives that shaped African American masculinity during the Jim Crow era. Jacqueline M. Moore, writing for The American Historical Review, found that the ideas shared within the book "are thought provoking", specifically praising how Ross "creates fresh ways of incorporating ideas of masculinity into discussion of race reform," as well as" his concept of racial trespassing and the cowboy image". However, Moore found that "the heavy jargon of his prose" made understanding the ideas more difficult.

Ross's most recent book, Sissy Insurgencies: A Racial Anatomy of Unfit Manliness, was published by Duke University Press in 2022. Across six chapters, the book "examines the figure of the sissy in order to reevaluate how Americans have articulated and negotiated boyhood and manhood from the 1880s to the present". Notable figures discussed in the book include Booker T. Washington, George Washington Carver, James Baldwin, and Truman Capote. Sissy Insurgencies was a finalist for the 2023 Lambda Literary Award for LGBTQ+ Studies.

== Publications ==
- The Contours of Masculine Desire: Romanticism and the Rise of Women's Poetry. Oxford University Press. 1989. ISBN 978-0-195-05791-1.
- Manning the Race: Reforming Black Men in the Jim Crow Era. New York Press. 2004. ISBN 978-0-814-77563-9.
- Sissy Insurgencies: A Racial Anatomy of Unfit Manliness. Duke University Press. 2022. ISBN 978-1-478-02245-9.
