= Name All the Animals =

2004 memoir by Alison Smith

- Author: Alison Smith
- Language: English
- Genre: Memoir
- Publisher: Scribner
- Pages: 319
- ISBN: 0-7432-5523-2
- OCLC: 1010742533

Name All the Animals is a 2004 memoir by Alison Smith, detailing the aftermath of the death of her eighteen-year-old brother. While attending Our Lady of Mercy High School, a Catholic high school, Smith developed an eating disorder, lost her faith in God and realized that she was a lesbian, all after her brother's death.

The book has received significant acclaim. It was named one of People Magazine’s ten best books of 2004 and won the Barnes & Noble Discover Award for Non-Fiction, the 2005 Lambda Literary Award for Autobiography/Memoir and the 2005 Judy Grahn Award.

== Editions ==
- Hardcover: ISBN 0-7432-5522-4
- Paperback: ISBN 0-7432-5523-2
