= Oliver Baez Bendorf =

American poet and writer (born 1987)

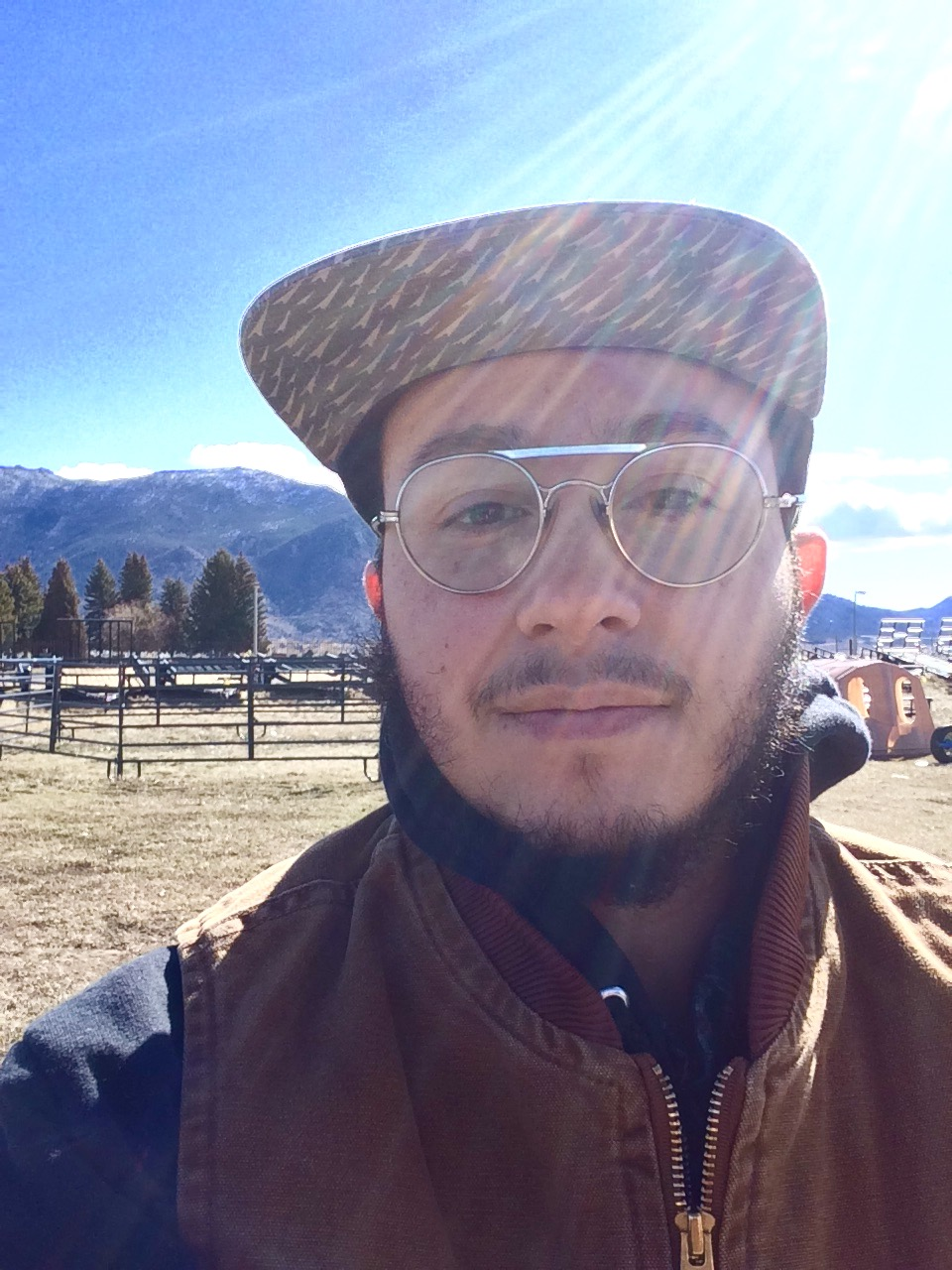
- Born: June 21, 1987 (age 39); Iowa City, Iowa, US
- Education: University of Iowa (BA), University of Wisconsin-Madison (MFA) (MLIS)
- Writing career
- Genre: Poetry
- Notable works: The Spectral Wilderness (2015), Advantages of Being Evergreen (2019)
- Website: www.oliverbaezbendorf.com

Oliver Baez Bendorf (born 1987) is an American poet.

== Early life and education ==
Oliver Baez Bendorf was born on June 21, 1987, in Iowa City, Iowa. His poems sometimes feature the landscape of his childhood, and his writing about returning to Iowa for a visit while transitioning genders was published in Buzzfeed.

He graduated with a BA from the University of Iowa in 2009. In 2013, he earned an MFA in poetry from the University of Wisconsin-Madison, where he met his teachers Lynda Barry, Quan Barry, Amaud Jamaul Johnson, Jesse Lee Kercheval, and Ronald Wallace. In 2015, he received an MA in Library and Information Studies, also from the University of Wisconsin-Madison, where he worked with the Little Magazine Collection, one of the most extensive of its kind in the United States. Bendorf is a fellow of the CantoMundo Poetry Workshop.

== Career ==
Bendorf's poetry publications include the book The Spectral Wilderness, selected by Mark Doty for the 2013 Stan & Tom Wick Poetry Prize, and released by Kent State University Press in 2015, and Advantages of Being Evergreen, which was selected for the 2018 Open Book Poetry Competition of the Cleveland State University Poetry Center, and was published in September 2019. Poet Gabrielle Calvocoressi called Advantages of Being Evergreen "an essential book for our time and for all time", and wrote that "Baez Bendorf is making a future grammar for the moment all of our vessels are free and held. I am living for the world these poems anticipate… This is a book of the earth’s abiding wonder. And the body’s unbreakable ability to bloom."

His third book of poems, Consider the Rooster, published by Nightboat Books in 2024, was a finalist for the 2024 National Book Critics Circle Award in Poetry and was named one of the best poetry collections of 2024 by Lit Hub and Electric Literature.

His work has appeared in publications including Academy of American Poets' Poem-a-Day, American Poetry Review, BOMB, Black Warrior Review, jubilat, Poetry Magazine, and Troubling the Line: Trans and Genderqueer Poetry and Poetics. His poetry has been translated into Russian by Dmitry Kuzmin. Bendorf has also published essays and comics poetry, in addition to poetry.

He has taught poetry and creative writing at University of Wisconsin-Madison, 826DC, Madison Public Library, District of Columbia Public Schools, Mount Holyoke College, Wick Poetry Center, Kalamazoo College, Bread Loaf Environmental Writers' Conference, and elsewhere.

Bendorf is a transgender man, and has used his work to discuss gender identity and transition, sometimes in humorous ways. He is of German, Southern Italian, and Puerto Rican (Afro-Taíno and Spanish) ancestry.

In 2020, Bendorf was awarded the Betty Berzon Emerging Writer Award from Publishing Triangle, presented to an LGBTQ writer who has shown exceptional talent and promise. He was a 2021 National Endowment for the Arts Fellow. In 2021, he joined the poetry faculty of the low-residency MFA Program for Writers at Warren Wilson College.

== Awards and honors ==
- 2021 National Endowment for the Arts Fellowship for Poetry
- 2020 Betty Berzon Emerging Writer Award, Publishing Triangle
- 2019 Rane Arroyo Chapbook Series Prize, Seven Kitchens Press
- 2018 Open Book Poetry Competition, Cleveland State University Poetry Center
- 2017-2018 Halls Emerging Artist Fellowship at the Wisconsin Institute for Creative Writing
- 2015 New American Poets, Poetry Society of America, selected by Natalie Diaz
- 2013-14 Doug Fir Fiction Award, The Bear Deluxe, selected by Lidia Yuknavitch
- 2013 Stan & Tom Wick Poetry Prize, The Spectral Wilderness, Kent State University Press, 2015, selected by Mark Doty
- 2011-13 Martha Meier Renk Distinguished Graduate Fellowship in Poetry at University of Wisconsin-Madison

== Works ==
- Book: Consider the Rooster. Nightboat Books. 2024. ISBN 978-1-64362-238-5
- Poem: "I Just Chose My Place and Let the Circle Form Around Me". The Nation. 2021.
- Poem: “Impervious”. The Cincinnati Review. 2020.
- Poem: “River I Dream About”. American Poetry Review. 2020.
- Poem: "Settler/Unsettled". BOMB Magazine. 2019.
- Book: Advantages of Being Evergreen. Cleveland State University Poetry Center. 2019. ISBN 9781880834008.
- Chapbook: The Gospel According to X. Seven Kitchens Press. 2019. ISBN 978-1-949333-57-2
- Book: The Spectral Wilderness: Poems. Kent State University Press. 2015. ISBN 9781606352113.
- Zine: Top Surgery. Self-published. 2016.
