= Queer Lasting =

2025 book by Sarah Ensor

- Author: Sarah Ensor
- Publisher: New York University Press
- Publication date: February 4, 2025
- Pages: 280
- Awards: Lambda Literary Award for LGBTQ+ Studies (2026)
- ISBN: 978-1-479-82947-7

Queer Lasting: Ecologies of Care for a Dying World is a 2025 non-fiction book by American scholar Sarah Ensor. In the book, Ensor explores the current context of environmental detriment, noting that many efforts focus on improving the future. With this in mind, Ensor draws from environmentalism, queer theory, and literary studies to question what could be learned from queer communities about living in the midst of crisis. In response, Ensor looks to the 1890s and the 1980s during the AIDS epidemic.

Queer Lasting won the 2026 Lambda Literary Award for LGBTQ+ Studies.

== Contents ==
Queer Lasting consists of the following chapters:

- "Introduction: Queer Lasting", which provides foundational information about the book's theoretical underpinnings in environmentalism and queer theory.
- "Terminal Regions: Queer Ecocriticism at Life's Ends", which discussing terminal regions, death doulas, and the terminal present while drawing on work from American feminist scholar Eve Kosofsky Sedgwick (1950–2009) and American novelist Sarah Orne Jewett (1849–1909), specifically Sedgwick's discussions of "terminal regions" and Jewett's 1896 short story sequence The Country of the Pointed Firs.
- "Grammars of the Unrealized: Lost Causes and Subjunctive Possibilities in Willa Cather", which looks to the work of American writer Willa Cather (1873–1947), including her 1925 novel, The Professor's House. Ensor connects Cather's work to the work of American academics Jack Halberstam (born 1961) and Heather K. Love.
- "Queer Unliving: Species of Extinction in the Literature of HIV/AIDS", which looks at literature during the 1980s HIV/AIDS epidemic, including the poetry of American writer and academic Melvin Dixon (1950–1992) and Allen Barnett's (1955–1991) short story "Philostorgy, Now Obscure". Through this chapter, Ensor explores the idea of living within an extinction.
- "Cruising the Planet: The Sexual Ecology of Samuel Delany", which looks at cruising culture and the work of American author, critic, and academic Samuel R. Delany (born 1942), specifically Times Square Red, Times Square Blue (1999), as well as the work of American literary theorist Leo Bersani (1931–2022).
- "Persistent Decay: Queer Half-Lives and the Poetics of Fallout", which brings together ideas from the previous chapters.
- "Epilogue: The Gays and the Grays"

Throughout Queer Lasting, Ensor argues

that the environmentalist obsession with saving, preserving, safeguarding, healing the planet for future generations–that is, the future-oriented outlook propelling environmental activism and ecocriticism alike–should be complemented by another way of engaging with environmental collapse, one that does not focus on the future but rather lingers in the end and makes it last–and count.

== Reception ==
Kirkus Reviews described the book as "a provocative and insightful look to the past for solutions to enhance and survive the future", while Katie Hogan, writing for ISLE: Interdisciplinary Studies in Literature and Environment, called it an "intricate, creative study of a vast world that exists behind the idea of futurity". Valentina Romanzi, writing for Iperstoria, praised Ensor, writing that Queer Lasting "is impressive in its ability to weave together different fields of thinking, to introduce counterintuitive questions as apparently little more than curious thought experiments that turn into new epistemological paradigms by the end of her volume."

Queer Lasting won the 2026 Lambda Literary Award for LGBTQ+ Studies.

== Author ==
Sarah Ensor is an academic in the field of English literature. Her research focuses on nineteenth- and twentieth-century American literature using environmental humanities and queer theory. She earned a Bachelor of Arts from the University of Michigan in 2003, after which she attended Cornell University, earning a Master of Arts in 2009 and a Doctor of Philosophy in 2012. As of 2026, Ensor is an associate professor in the English department at the University of Wisconsin–Madison.
