= Heather K. Love =

Scholar of English literature

Academic background
- Education: Harvard University (BA, 1991); University of Virginia (MA, PhD, 2001)

Academic work
- Discipline: English literature
- Sub-discipline: 20th-century literature; Literary theory; Gender and sexuality studies
- Institutions: University of Pennsylvania (2003-2026)

Heather K. Love is an academic in English literature with a focus on twentieth-century literature, literary theory, and gender and sexuality studies. She is the author of Feeling Backward (2007) and Underdogs (2021); she is also the co-editor of Literary Studies & Human Flourishing (2023), with James F. English. As of Fall 2026, Love is Distinguished Professor of English at Rutgers University.

== Early life and education ==
Love grew up in Louisville, Kentucky. She earned a Bachelor of Arts in literature from Harvard University in 1991, after which she attended the University of Virginia, earning a Master of Arts and Doctor of Philosophy in literature in 2001.

== Career ==
Before attending graduate school, Love had many jobs, including "working on a farm, as a construction worker, driving a truck, and [working] in a furniture store". She began her career in academia as an assistant professor in the English department at the University of Pennsylvania in 2003. She has remained at the university since then, earning the rank of associate professor in 2009 and full professor in 2019. As a researcher, her "interests include gender and sexuality studies, twentieth-century literature and culture, affect studies, sociology and literature, disability studies, film and visual culture, and critical theory".

Love's first book, Feeling Backward: Loss and the Politics of Queer History, was published by Harvard University Press in 2007. The book explores what is lost about queer culture as queerness assimilates into mainstream culture. Throughout the book, Love engages with the work of English writers Walter Pater (1839–1894), Radclyffe Hall (1880–1943), and Sylvia Townsend Warner (1893–1978), as well as American writers Willa Cather (1873–1947) and Sarah Orne Jewett (1849–1909). Feeling Backward was a finalist for the 2008 Lambda Literary Award for Arts & Culture, and is heavily referenced in Sarah Ensor's 2025 book, Queer Lasting.

Underdogs: Social Deviance and Queer Theory, Love's second book, was published by the University of Chicago Press in 2021. The book provides a genealogy of queer theory, highlighting how the field developed from activists and theorists of marginalized communities, despite the latter's early contributions often being overlooked, according to Love. Underdogs specifically turns to the earlier works of Erving Goffman (1922–1982), Laud Humphreys (1930–1988), John Kitsuse (1923–2003), and Samuel R. Delany (born 1942), while connecting this work to more recent scholarship from Eve Kosofsky Sedgwick (1950–2009), Joan Scott, Judith Butler (born 1956), Gayle Rubin (born 1949), and Sara Ahmed (born 1969).

In 2023, Oxford University Press published Literary Studies & Human Flourishing, which Love co-edited with James F. English. The book consists of fives parts: "Happy Reading: Literature Without the Academy", "Flourishing Beyond Reason: Literature's Augmented Realities", "Flourishing in Crisis: The Poetics of Disaster", "Non-Normative Flourishing: Disability and Aging", and "Positive Affect: Redescription Repair".

Love received a Guggenheim Fellowship in 2023.

== Personal life ==
Love is gay.

== Publications ==
- Love, Heather K. (2007). Feeling Backward: Loss and the Politics of Queer History. Harvard University Press.
- Love, Heather K. (2021). Underdogs: Social Deviance and Queer Theory. University of Chicago Press.
- English, James; Love, Heather K., eds. (2023). Literary Studies & Human Flourishing. Oxford University Press.
