= Regina Kunzel =

American historian and author

- Education: Yale University; Stanford University
- Occupations: Academic; writer; Historian
- Writing career
- Subjects: Gender studies Queer studies
- Notable works: Criminal Intimacy: Prison and the Uneven History of Modern American Sexuality (2008); In the Shadow of Diagnosis: Psychiatric Power and Queer Life
- Notable awards: Lambda Literary Award for LGBT Studies

Regina Kunzel (born 1959) is an American author, historian, and academic. She is the Larned Professor of History at Yale. Prior to joining the Yale faculty, she held the Doris Stevens Chair at Princeton University, the Paul R. Frenzel Chair at the University of Minnesota, and the Fairleigh Dickinson Chair at Williams College. Her book Criminal Intimacy: Prison and the Uneven History of Modern American Sexuality (University of Chicago Press, 2008) received the American Historical Association’s John Boswell Prize, the Modern Language Association’s Alan Bray Memorial Book Award and the Lambda Literary Award for LGBT Studies.

== Early life and education ==
Regina Kunzel earned her Ph.D. in history from Yale University and her Bachelor of Arts degree from Stanford University.

== Career ==
Regina Kunzel began her career in the Department of History at Williams College. Her work explores histories of gender and sexuality, queer history, the history of psychiatry, and the history of incarceration. She was a co-editor for the journal Gender & History. With Janice Irvine, she co-edits a book series on sexuality studies for Temple University Press.

== Publications ==
=== Books ===
- Kunzel, Regina (1993). Fallen women, Problem Girls: Unmarried Mothers and the Professionalization of Social Work, 1890 - 1945. New Haven: Yale University Press. ISBN 9780300065091.
- Kunzel, Regina (2008). Criminal Intimacy: Prison and the Uneven History of Modern American Sexuality. Chicago: University of Chicago Press. ISBN 9780226462264.
- Kunzel, Regina, In the Shadow of Diagnosis: Psychiatric Power and Queer Life (University of Chicago Press, 2024)

=== Journals ===
- Kunzel, Regina G. (1988). "The Professionalization of Benevolence: Evangelicals and Social Workers in the Florence Crittenton Homes, 1915 to 1945". Journal of Social History. 22 (1): 21–43. doi:10.1353/jsh/22.1.21. ISSN 0022-4529. JSTOR 3787950.
- Kunzel, Regina (December 1995). "Pulp Fictions and Problem Girls: Reading and Rewriting Single Pregnancy in the Postwar United States". The American Historical Review. 100 (5): 1465–1487. doi:10.2307/2169866. JSTOR 2169866.
- Kunzel, Regina (1 January 2011). "Queer Studies in Queer Times". GLQ: A Journal of Lesbian and Gay Studies. 17 (1): 155–165. doi:10.1215/10642684-2010-026.
- Kunzel, Regina (1 May 2014). "The Flourishing of Transgender Studies". TSQ: Transgender Studies Quarterly. 1 (1–2): 285–297. doi:10.1215/23289252-2399461.
- Kunzel, Regina (2017). "Queer History, Mad History, and the Politics of Health". American Quarterly. 69 (2): 315–319. doi:10.1353/aq.2017.0026.
- Kunzel, Regina (1 December 2018). "The Power of Queer History". The American Historical Review. 123 (5): 1560–1582. doi:10.1093/ahr/rhy202.
