= Kathryn Bond Stockton =

American academic

Kathryn Bond Stockton is an American writer and academic. She works at the University of Utah, where she is a professor of English and served as the inaugural dean of the School for Cultural and Social Transformation. She teaches queer theory, race and gender, and twentieth-century film and literature.

Her books have twice been finalists for the Lambda Literary Award for LGBTQ+ Studies.

== Education ==
In 1979, Stockton received a Bachelor of Arts from the University of Connecticut, where she majored in psychology and minored in philosophy. There, she joined Phi Beta Kappa.

She then received a Master of Divinity from Yale Divinity School in 1982, a Master of Arts from Brown University in 1984, and a Doctor of Philosophy from Brown University in 1989.

== Career ==
Stockton joined the faculty at the University of Utah in 1987 and became a Distinguished Professor in 2012, at which time she had been the program director for gender studies for ten years. In 2013, she was awarded the Rosenblatt Prize for Excellence, the University of Utah's highest award, presented to "a faculty member who displays excellence in teaching, research and administrative efforts." She then served as the inaugural dean of the School for Cultural and Social Transformation and as the Associate Vice President for Equity and Diversity.

Stockton served as a core faculty member at Cornell University’s School of Criticism and Theory in 2011. She has also been a reviewer for the Danish Research Council, American Council of Learned Societies, and The Year’s Work in Critical and Cultural Theory; an editorial board member for American Literature and Genders; and an advisory board member for Critical Childhood & Youth Studies, Queer Studies in Media and Popular Culture, and West Virginia University Press.

== Personal life ==
Stockton has stated that, though she was assigned female at birth, she often does not consider herself a woman, and if she were born in a different era, she may identify as transgender. In 2015, she had been in a "not lesbian" relationship with her girlfriend, who was also assigned female at birth, for 25 years. In this relationship, Stockton has referred to herself as "a gayish queer" and to her girlfriend as a "straightish queer."

== Awards and honors ==
Stockton has received fellowships from Wesleyan University, Brown University, and the University of Utah.

For her teaching and scholarship, she has received the University of Utah's Rosenblatt Prize for Excellence and Ramona W. Cannon Award for Teaching Excellence in the Humanities, the National Organization for Women's Lifetime Achievement Award, and the Modern Language Association's Crompton-Noll Prize.

Her books Beautiful Bottom, Beautiful Shame and The Queer Child, or Growing Sideways in the Twentieth Century were both finalists for the Lambda Literary Award for LGBTQ+ Studies.

In 2015, she was honored with Equality Utah’s Allies Award.

In 2020, her book Making Out was a finalist for the Next Generation Indie Book Award in the Memoirs (Other) category.

== Publications ==
=== Books ===
==== As author ====
- God Between Their Lips: Desire Between Women in Irigaray, Brontë, and Eliot (1994)
- Beautiful Bottom, Beautiful Shame: Where "Black" Meets "Queer" (2006)
- Queer Temporalities (2007)
- The Queer Child, or Growing Sideways in the Twentieth Century (2009)
- Making Out (2019)
- Gender (2021)

==== As editor ====
- The Child Now (2016)

=== Articles and book chapters ===
- "Being and Becoming Animal and Modern: Review of Atavistic Tendencies by Dana Seitler" in Criticism (2009)
- “LOST, or ‘Exit, Pursued by a Bear’: Causing Queer Children on Shakespeare's TV” in Shakesqueer, edited by Madhavi Menon (2010)
- “Jouissance, the Gash of Bliss” in Clinical Encounters: Psychoanalytic Practice and Queer Theory, edited by Noreen Giffney and Eve Watson (2010)
- “The Queerness of Race and Same-Sex Desire” in Cambridge Companion to Gay and Lesbian Writing, edited by Hugh Stevens (2011)
- “Rhythm: Secular Feelings, Religious Feelings” in Queer Times, Queer Becomings, edited by E. L. McCallum and Mikko Tuhkanen (2011)
- "Toeholds and Sticking Points: Review of Stephanie Harzewski, Chick Lit and Postfeminism" in NOVEL (2012)
- "Review of Robin Bernstein, Racial Innocence: Performing American Childhood from Slavery to Civil Rights" in Modern Drama (2012)
- "Tone on the Range: What to Make of Cruel Optimism?" in Social Text (2013)
- “We’ll Be Happy, When? Affects, Orgasms, Singles, and Objects in Queer Theory” in The Year’s Work in Critical and Cultural Theory (2014)
- "Reading as Kissing, Sex with Ideas: 'Lesbian' Barebacking?" in Los Angeles Review of Books Quarterly Journal (2015)
- “Monstrously Yours? Afterword” in Monstrous Children and Childish Monsters: Essays on Cinema's Holy Terrors, edited by Markus McFarland, P.J. Bohlmann, and Sean Moreland (2015)
- “Is It in Your Body?” in Princeton Pocket Instructor on Literature, edited by William Gleason and Diana Fuss (2015)
- "If Queer Children Were a Video Game" in Queer Game Studies, edited by Ben Aslinger, Bonnie Ruberg, and Adrienne Shaw (2015)
- “Surfacing (in the Heat of Reading): Is It Like Kissing or Some Other Sex Act?” in J19 (2015)
- "What is the Now, Even of Then?" with Rebekah Sheldon and Jules Gill-Peterson, in GLQ (2016)
- “The Queer Child Now and Its Paradoxical Global Effects” in GLQ (2016)
- "Where Is Queer? In the Neighborhood, the Gesture, the Drug, the Word?" in The Year's Work in Critical and Cultural Theory (2016)
- "On the Eve of Weather" in Reading Eve Kosofsky Sedgwick: Gender, Sexuality, Embodiment, edited by Lauren Berlant (2019)
