= Judith Frank =

American writer and professor

- Education: Hebrew University of Jerusalem (BA); Cornell University (MFA, PhD)
- Occupations: Novelist, short story writer
- Writing career
- Period: 2000s–present
- Notable works: Crybaby Butch, All I Love and Know

Judith Frank is an American writer and professor. She has been a two-time Lambda Literary Award nominee, winning in the Lesbian Debut Fiction category at the 17th Lambda Literary Awards in 2005 for her novel Crybaby Butch, and being a shortlisted nominee in the Gay Fiction category at the 27th Lambda Literary Awards in 2015 for All I Love and Know. She is Jewish.

Originally from Evanston, Illinois, Frank spent some time living in Jerusalem, Israel as a teenager. She was educated at the Hebrew University of Jerusalem for her B.A. and Cornell University for her MFA and PhD. She joined Amherst College as a professor of English and creative writing in 1988.

She has also published short stories in The Massachusetts Review, Other Voices and Best Lesbian Love Stories 2005, as well as the critical study Common Ground: Eighteenth-Century English Satiric Fiction and the Poor.

== Works ==
- Common Ground: Eighteenth-Century English Satiric Fiction and the Poor (1997)
- Crybaby Butch (2004)
- All I Love and Know (2014)

== Awards ==
- 2000: Emerging Lesbian Writers Fund Award for fiction from the Astraea Foundation
- 2005: Lambda Literary Award for Crybaby Butch
- 2006: Yaddo artists' colony residency
- 2008: National Endowment for the Arts fellowship
- 2012: MacDowell Colony residency
