= A Son Called Gabriel =

2004 novel by Damian McNicholl

- First edition cover
- Author: Damian McNicholl
- Language: English
- Genre: Novel
- Publisher: CDS Books
- Publication date: June 2004
- Publication place: Ireland
- Media type: Hardback and paperback
- Pages: 343 pp (first edition, hardback)
- ISBN: 1-59315-018-0 (first edition, hardback)
- OCLC: 55626756

A Son Called Gabriel is the 2004 debut novel by author Damian McNicholl. It was a finalist for a Lambda Award in 2005.

Set in Northern Ireland in the sixties and seventies, this novel describes the coming-of-age and sexual awakening of Gabriel Harkin. Gabriel, a working class Catholic boy, writes in the first person and talks about his life from the age of six to sixteen and there is a dark family secret involving his Uncle Brendan who is a priest in Kenya.

Gabriel's story is set against the backdrop of the Troubles and the religious bigotry of the Province.

== Development ==
McNicholl started writing the novel in 1990, after moving to the United States. It took him 6 months of full-time writing to compose the novel, and another 18 to find a Literary agent and get the novel to publication with CDS books, after the editor at GreyCore Press liked the book, but couldn't publish it.

== Plot summary ==
As he grows up, Gabriel starts to suspect that he is not like other boys, and engages in a series of sexually oriented games with Noel, a young male friend. He is later caught in the act by his childhood friend Fergal. During adolescence, Gabriel is convinced by his cousin Connor to sexually experiment with him, learns he is attracted to his own sex, and tries to fight it by trying to make himself attracted to girls. At sixteen, he is also abused at school by a priest Father Cornelius.

The story ends with Brendan's revelation and Gabriel about to leave Ireland to go to University in England, and the reader has to draw his or her own conclusions about whether Gabriel will continue his relationship with Fiona – with whom he is in love but can't have a sexual relationship – or reconcile with his homosexual leanings.

== Style ==
The novel's first person voice is a defining stylistic trait. In an interview for Conversational Reading, McNicholl noted that the voice was very deliberately constructed: "I wanted the narration and dialogue to portray the boy’s innocence and growth in awareness as he matures, but I had to be careful because the book is intended for an adult audience and thus had to be sophisticated and credible simultaneously." Publishers Weekly emphasized how this voice does a good job representing its adolescent narrator: Awkward, sometimes tender sex scenes—with both genders—recall all the clumsy uncertainties of adolescence."

== Reception ==
Publishers Weekly called the novel "a worthy debut", noting that McNicholl is a "graceful writer".

== See also ==
- Roman Catholicism
- Northern Ireland
