= Why Marriage Matters =

2004 book by Evan Wolfson

Why Marriage Matters: America, Equality, and Gay People's Right to Marry
- Cover of the first edition
- Author: Evan Wolfson
- Language: English
- Subject: Same-sex marriage
- Publisher: Simon & Schuster
- Publication date: 2004
- Publication place: United States
- Media type: Print (Hardcover and Paperback)
- Pages: 240
- ISBN: 0-7432-6458-4

Why Marriage Matters: America, Equality, and Gay People's Right to Marry is a 2004 book by Evan Wolfson in which the author advocates the legal recognition of same-sex marriage. It was published by Simon & Schuster.

== Reviews ==
- Charles, Harry (15 July 2004). "Law & Crime". Library Journal. Vol. 129, no. 12. pp. 101–102. ISSN 0363-0277.
- DeCrescenzo, Teresa (1 November 2004). "A Look at Books". Lesbian News. Vol. 30, no. 4. p. 33. ISSN 0739-1803.
- Garrow, David J. (15 August 2004). "Once in the Closet, Now in the Courts". Los Angeles Times. p. R3. ISSN 0458-3035. Archived from the original on 13 July 2022.
- Graff, E. J. (September 2004). "Marriage Matters". Out. Here Publishing. pp. 104, 106, 110. ISSN 1062-7928.
- Graham, Chad (31 August 2004). "Tradition! Tradition?". The Advocate. No. 921. p. 33. ISSN 0001-8996.
- Hall, J. S. (28 August 2004). "Good marriage reading". Q-Notes. Vol. 19, no. 8. p. 30.
- Hartnett, Kimberly Marlowe (1 August 2004). "Making the Case for Gay Marriage". The Oregonian. p. D07. ISSN 8750-1317.
- "Why Marriage Matters". Kirkus Reviews. Vol. 72, no. 11. 1 June 2004. p. 532. ISSN 1948-7428.
- Miller, Tim (5 August 2004). "Saving the Union with Evan Wolfson". Bay Area Reporter. Vol. 34, no. 32. pp. 25, 34, 40. ISSN 2374-264X.
- Mumford, Kevin (2005). "The Miscegenation Analogy Revisited: Same-Sex Marriage as a Civil Rights Story". American Quarterly. 57 (2): 523–531. doi:10.1353/aq.2005.0032. ISSN 0003-0678. JSTOR 40068278. S2CID 144842240.
- Olivera, Edward (June–July 2004). "Topics in Citizenship". Lambda Book Report. Vol. 12, no. 11. pp. 17–18. ISSN 1048-9487.
- "Nonfiction". Publishers Weekly. Vol. 251, no. 26. 28 June 2004. p. 43. ISSN 0000-0019.
- Saletan, William (26 September 2004). "The Peculiar Institution". The New York Times Book Review. p. 9. ISSN 0028-7806.
