= Robin Talley =

American author of young adult books

Robin Talley is an American author of young adult books.

Talley has worked as a communications strategist for nonprofit organizations "focusing on educational equity, gay rights, women's rights, and beyond". Her novels feature racially diverse and LGBTQ+ characters.

== Awards ==
Talley won the inaugural Amnesty CILIP Honour for her first novel, Lies We Tell Ourselves, in 2014; the same novel was shortlisted for the CILIP Carnegie Medal and the Lambda Literary Award.

Her second novel, What We Left Behind, was included on the American Library Association's Rainbow List.

Her third novel, As I Descended, was shortlisted for the 2016 Kirkus Prize.

== Bibliography ==
=== Novels ===
- Lies We Tell Ourselves (Harlequin Teen, 2014) ISBN 9780373211333
- What We Left Behind (Harlequin Teen, 2015) ISBN 9780373211753
- As I Descended (HarperTeen, 2016) ISBN 9780062409232
- Our Own Private Universe (Harlequin Teen, 2017) ISBN 9780373211982
- Pulp (2018) ISBN 9781335012906
- The Love Curse of Melody McIntyre (HarperTeen, 2020) ISBN 9780062409263
- Music from another world (Inkyard Press, 2020) ISBN 9781335146779

=== Short stories ===
- "The Whole World is Watching" in A Tyranny of Petticoats: 15 Stories of Belles, Bank Robbers and Other Badass Girls, edited by Jessica Spotswood (Candlewick Press, 2016)
- "The Legend of Stone Mary" in Toil & Trouble: 15 Tales of Women & Witchcraft, edited by Jessica Spotswood and Tess Sharpe (Harlequin Teen, 2018)
