= Dwight A. McBride =

American academic administrator and scholar of race and literary studies

- Born: 1967 (age 58–59); Honea Path, South Carolina, U.S.

Academic background
- Education: Princeton University (AB); University of California, Los Angeles (MA, PhD)

Academic work
- Notable works: Why I Hate Abercrombie & Fitch: Essays on Race and Sexuality; Impossible Witnesses: Truth, Abolitionism and Slave Testimony; Black Like Us: A Century of Lesbian, Gay and Bisexual African American Fiction (co-ed.)

9th President of The New School
- In office April 16, 2020 – August 15, 2023
- Preceded by: David E. Van Zandt
- Succeeded by: Donna Shalala (interim)

Dwight A. McBride (born 1967) is an American academic administrator and scholar of African American and literary studies. He has been a distinguished professor, and advisor to the chancellor at Washington University in St. Louis since 2023. From April 16, 2020, to August 2023, he served as the ninth president of The New School. McBride previously served as provost, executive vice president for academic affairs, and Asa Griggs Candler Professor of African-American studies at Emory University.

== Early life and education ==
Dwight A. McBride was born in Honea Path, South Carolina and raised in Belton, South Carolina. He graduated from Belton-Honea Path High School in 1986.

McBride graduated from Princeton University, where he studied English and African American studies. He then earned a master's degree and Ph.D. in English from the University of California, Los Angeles.

== Career ==
McBride taught at the University of Pittsburgh, then served as dean of the College of Liberal Arts and Sciences at the University of Illinois at Chicago from 2007 to 2010. He next served as Daniel Hale Williams Professor of African American Studies, English, & Performance Studies at Northwestern University, as well as Dean of the Graduate School and Associate Provost of Graduate Education. On July 1, 2017, he became Provost and Executive Vice President for Academic Affairs and Asa Griggs Candler Professor of African American Studies and Distinguished Affiliated Professor of English at Emory University. He joined The New School as president on April 16, 2020, and announced his departure in 2023.

McBride is an author of numerous books and edited collections. His works include James Baldwin Now (NYU Press, 1999), Impossible Witnesses: Truth, Abolitionism, and Slave Testimony (NYU Press, 2002), the Hurston-Wright Legacy Award-nominated essay collection Why I Hate Abercrombie and Fitch: Essay on Race and Sexuality (NYU Press, 2005), and the Lambda Literary Award-winning anthology Black Like Us: A Century of Gay, Lesbian, and Bi-Sexual African American Fiction (Cleis Press, 2011).

McBride has also co-edited several collections and posthumous volumes, including a special issue of the journal Callaloo entitled "Plum Nelly: New Essays in Queer Black Studies" (2000), A Melvin Dixon Critical Reader (Mississippi Press, 2006), Racial Blackness and the Discontinuity of Western Modernity (Univ. of Illinois Press, 2013), and the Lambda Literary Award-winning book The Delectable Negro: Human Consumption and Homoeroticism within U.S. Slave Culture (NYU Press, 2014).

McBride is one of the founding editors and current co-editor of the open access scholarly journal, James Baldwin Review (Manchester Univ. Press), and co-editor of The New Black Studies book series at the University of Illinois Press.

== Works ==
- ed. James Baldwin Now (1999)
- Impossible Witnesses: Truth, Abolitionism, and Slave Testimony (New York University Press, 2002)
- Why I Hate Abercrombie & Fitch: Essays On Race and Sexuality (Sexual Cultures Series, 2005)
- ed. Black Like Us: A Century of Lesbian, Gay, and Bisexual African American Fiction with Devon W. Carbado, Don Weise, and Evelyn C. White (2002)
- A Melvin Dixon Critical Reader with Justin A. Joyce (2010)
