= How I Paid for College =

2004 book by Marc Acito

How I Paid for College: A Novel of Sex, Theft, Friendship, and Musical Theater
- Hardback first edition cover
- Author: Marc Acito
- Language: English
- Genre: Young adult novel
- Publisher: Broadway Books
- Publication date: September 2004
- Publication place: United States
- Media type: Print (Hardback & Paperback)
- Pages: 288 pp (first edition, hardback)
- ISBN: 0-7679-1841-X (first edition, hardback)
- OCLC: 53993019
- Dewey Decimal: 813/.6 22
- LC Class: PS3601.C53 H69 2004

How I Paid for College: A Novel of Sex, Theft, Friendship, and Musical Theater is a 2004 teen novel, the first by American author Marc Acito. The story centers on Edward Zanni, a 17-year-old high school senior living in New Jersey, US in the early 1980s, whose ambition to ascend to the Juilliard School in New York City to study acting is quashed when his father refuses to pay his tuition fees.

The novel won the Oregon Book Awards' Ken Kesey Award for Best Novel in 2005, and received generally favourable reviews.

== Plot ==
The novel begins with a discussion of the character's summer goals: Paula losing her virginity and all of the characters having “madcap adventures.” Then Edward meets his father's girlfriend, Dagmar. While driving around they spot a green Ceramic Buddha and come up with their plan called Creative Vandalism, which means bringing “flair and vitality” to the suburbs without doing anything illegal. Ed then finds out Dagmar and his father Al are getting married. Edward throws a big party at his house to celebrate the end of the summer and a lot of people he doesn't really know show up. He ends up revealing that he has strong sexual feelings for Doug. Edward learns that his step mom, Dagmar, is a “raving lunatic.” Then Edward's world falls apart when he learns that his dream of going to Juilliard and becoming an actor may be hindered because his father refuses to pay for Edward's college unless he goes into business.

Natie decides that Edward needs to get a job to pay for college. Doug asks Edward if he bisexual, Edward says yes. Edward quits the school play in order to do his job, and in his absence Doug and Kelly grow close. Kelly wants to have sex, but Edward keeps avoiding it. Edward declares himself financially independent of his father and needs somewhere to live, so he moves in with Kelly. Edward grows more in love with Doug and eventually admits it to him. Edward needs to go to an audition for Juilliard so he goes to New York. He goes to a gay bar and sees his teacher, Mr. Lucas, who takes him back to his apartment to get him out of the bar. In the morning Edward wakes up hung over and late for his audition. During the audition Edward can't remember his lines and breaks down ranting about his father and how much he hates him, which fits his speech. He leaves convinced he has not got in, but he does. Edward breaks up with Kelly, so now Kelly and Doug are dating. Doug (who is fluent in German; Dagmar's native language) and Edward learn that Dagmar has been stealing money form Edward's father they decide to steal it and put it into a scholarship that Edward will be sure to get.

On a choir trip to Washington D.C. Doug and Edward almost have a gay moment. However, Ziba invites a past boyfriend to hang out at the hotel but he refuses to leave. He is reduced to repeated vomiting followed by passing out. They then take incriminating pictures of him to use as blackmail to get Edward money for college.

Edward then visits Paula in New York and Edward finds out that he didn't get the scholarship. Dagmar knows that Edward stole her money but can't prove it. Aunt Glo gets arrested. Her car was used in vandalism cases over the past summer and the Buddha was reported stolen. When Edward goes home he finds Ziba and Kelly fooling around in bed, They go to pick up the Buddha and on the way back are stopped, the Buddha is discovered and they are arrested. After some negotiating and phone calls they are let out and must return the Buddha. Kelly and Edward have sex and it progresses for a while but ultimately Kelly goes back to Ziba. To create the scholarship they steal a dead little girl's identity, and it turns out to be the late sister of one of Doug's friends: he keeps quiet and even gets a scholarship out of it. The school production of Godspell goes really well, phenomenally well and Edward is just reassured that this is what he wants to do for his whole life.

The good feeling form the play is cut short however because Dagmar is getting closer to finding out about the money. To counter this they decide to take incriminating pictures of Dagmar to get Al to divorce her so that he will pay for Juilliard. While they are taking the pictures Edward's mother returns form her spiritual journey in South America. After some discussion with her Edward finds out that Al must pay for him to go to the college of his choice, it says it in the divorce papers for his mother and father. Al agrees to pay if that's what Edward wants also him and Dagmar split up. In the end everybody goes their separate ways for college.

== Characters ==
- Edward Zanni - The novel's protagonist, a 17-year-old high school senior who dreams of attending Juilliard and is unsure of his sexuality. He spends his time acting, singing, dancing and participating in schemes to come up with the money for college.
- Kelly Corcoran - Edward's girlfriend and roommate at one point. She is also involved in musical theatre and eventually dates one of Edward's friends. She is relatively experimental with her sexuality.
- Doug Grabowski - Football player who joins the theatre group and reluctantly befriends the other “theatre kids." He is confident and surprisingly accepting as his friends reveal their darkest secrets to him. He dates Kelly and Paula during the novel.
- Paula D'Angelo - Edward's best friend, who leaves school a year earlier than him to attend Juilliard. She is wildly eccentric and unique. She is heavy set and makes it a priority to find a boyfriend while away at school. She helps Edward carry out his crazy plans to find money.
- Natie Nudelman - Edward's friend, a small, nerdy Jewish boy known as “Cheesehead” at school. He is the brains behind Edward's money making schemes. His parents are entirely too trusting, which gives him plenty of room to commit crimes with Edward.
- Ziba - Edward's friend, a glamorous Persian girl who joins the theatre group. She is much taller than the average girl and is also experimental with her sexuality.
- Al Zanni - Edward's tough, but ultimately loyal father. He refuses to pay for Edward's college, claiming that acting is a waste of time. He prefers that Edward go into business.
- Dagmar - Al's Austrian fiancée, whom Edward loathes. She gets caught up in one of Edward's revengeful plots, which ends up costing her a great deal of money.
- Ted Lucas - Edward's English teacher and drama coach, whom he looks up. He has an awkward run-in with Edward, revealing that he too has confusion surrounding his sexuality.
- Kathleen Corcoran - Kelly's mother, an alcoholic therapist, who takes Edward in when he runs away from home. She is very supportive of Edward and her own children, although she expresses her support in a rather unorthodox manner.
- Gloria "Aunt Glo" D'Angelo - Paula's aunt, with whom she lives, a devout Catholic woman. Her son Angelo is a priest, whom she treats like a baby. She accidentally gets caught up in an illegal entanglement with Edward and his friends.
- Barbara Zanni - Edward's estranged mother who makes a reappearance at the end of the novel. She is a free spirit who cannot be tied down by a husband and two children.

== Literary significance and reception ==
How I Paid for College was generally well received by critics. Some reviewers complain about the outlandish and somewhat unbelievable occurrences in the story, such as Melissa Rose Bernardo of Entertainment Weekly who claimed the novel would only appeal "to those with incredibly active imaginations." However, most were keen to assert the fun and humor of the novel, including Ben Arnold of the BBC who defined it as "Wildly camp and achingly funny...the best teen movie never made."

In 2023, the book was banned, in Clay County District Schools, Florida.

== Film adaptation ==
On November 25, 2004, in an interview with Acito, the Seattle Times newspaper reported that the rights to a film version of How I Paid for College had been secured by Columbia Pictures, less than a year after the novel's publication. Acito is quoted as saying "They promised me that the movie will keep the early '80s era, that they'll keep the bisexuality and that they will keep the musicals...As for the cast, we need kids who can sing, dance and act — so we probably don't even know who they are yet." As of 2008, no further details of the film's development have been publicized.
