= Why I Hate Abercrombie & Fitch =

2005 book by Dwight A. McBride

Why I Hate Abercrombie & Fitch: Essays on Race and Sexuality
- Author: Dwight A. McBride
- Language: English
- Subject: gay and black feminist and queer cultural commentary on race and sexuality
- Publisher: NYU Press
- Publication date: 2005
- Publication place: United States
- Media type: Print (Hardcover)
- Pages: 267
- ISBN: 978-0-8147-5686-7
- OCLC: 55947980
- Dewey Decimal: 305.896/073/00722 22
- LC Class: E184.7 .M348 2004

Why I Hate Abercrombie & Fitch: Essays on Race and Sexuality is a book by Dwight A. McBride on ethno-relational mores in contemporary gay African America with a nod to black, feminist and queer cultural contexts "dedicated to integrating sexuality and race into black and queer studies."

== Publication history ==
McBride published the book while serving as dean of the Graduate School at Northwestern University, where he was Chair of the Department of African American Studies from 2002 to 2007. The book was published by New York University Press.

== Content ==
The book is divided into three main sections: "Queer Black Thought", "Race and Sexuality on Occasion" and "Straight Black Talk", all exploring facets of the intersections of race, sexuality, class and gender issues. The often personal essays speak to the "ghettoization of black men in gay male porn" to broader subjects including the book's namesake Abercrombie & Fitch and how the clothing retailer influences the gay African-American male. McBride has been recognized as a specialist in bridging LGBT and racial issues illuminating both.

== Reception ==
The book has been used in queer studies as well as related college courses in universities McBride was a guest speaker at several universities speaking about the essay's subjects of race and sexuality in America.

In his review for GLQ: A Journal of Gay and Lesbian Studies, Rinaldo Walcott said, "McBride's multidisciplinary essays cross-pollinate black studies and queer theory to challenge both fields to account for their blind spots, their key debates, and their claims to authority."

In her review for Women's Studies Quarterly, Khary Polk said the book's combination of "polemic and erotic memoir" created "a lithe intellectual portrait of a black gay Christian man's journey into academe."

== Awards ==
The collection of essays "offering contemporary cultural criticism" was a 2006 Lambda Literary Award and 2006 Hurston/Wright Legacy Award nominee as well as the Passing The Torch winner from the New York University Press.

== Selected reviews ==
- Bradway, Tyler. College Literature, Fall 2006, Vol. 33 Issue 4, pgs. 223–225.
