= Belton-Honea Path High School =

Location
- 11000 Belton Honea Path Highway; Honea Path, South Carolina 29654; United States; 34°28′25″N 82°26′37″W

Information
- Type: Public secondary
- Motto: Quid ermus nunc fiemus. (What we shall be, we are now becoming.)
- Established: 1966 (60 years ago)
- School district: Anderson County School District 2
- CEEB code: 410130
- Principal: Mary Boarts
- Teaching staff: 64.50 (FTE)
- Grades: 9–12
- Enrollment: 1,133 (2023–2024)
- Student to teacher ratio: 17.57
- Colors: Blue, red, and white
- Mascot: Bear
- Website: bhp.anderson2.org

Belton-Honea Path High School (BHP) is a comprehensive, co-educational, public secondary school located in Honea Path, South Carolina, United States. It is the only public high school serving Honea Path and Belton. The school is accredited by the South Carolina Department of Education and the Southern Association of Colleges and Schools.

== History ==
Belton-Honea Path High School was built in 1966, and renovations and additions were made in 1967, 1987 and 2003. The school originally opened as a merger of Belton High School and Honea Path High School. It merged with Geer Gant High School in 1969.

== Athletics ==
Belton-Honea Path has teams for tennis, soccer, golf, wrestling, basketball, cross country, track and field, volleyball, baseball, competitive cheerleading, marching band, softball, and football.

== Notable alumni ==
- Mark Burns, pastor (did not graduate)
- Matthew LeCroy, former MLB player
- Dwight A. McBride, academic and president of The New School
