= The Delectable Negro =

2014 book

- Author: Vincent Woodard
- Language: English
- Subject: Slavery in the United States; Human cannibalism Homoeroticism
- Publisher: New York University Press
- Publication date: June 27, 2014
- Publication place: United States
- Media type: Print (hardback)
- Pages: 311
- Awards: Lambda Literary Award (2015)
- ISBN: 978-0-8147-9461-6
- OCLC: 6022079309
- LC Class: E443 .W67 2014

The Delectable Negro: Human Consumption and Homoeroticism within U.S. Slave Culture is a 2014 book by Vincent Woodard. The book explores the homoeroticism of both literal and figurative acts of human cannibalism that occurred during slavery in the United States.

Woodard examines the sexual nature of documented instances of flesh-eating and details the various manners of consumption whereby Black Americans were metaphorically or actually eaten. In the book, Woodard defines consumption as a range of parasitic practices, including institutionalized hunger, seasoning rituals, and sexual modes of consumption.

The Delectable Negro draws on Works Progress Administration interviews, advertisements for runaway slaves, and slave narratives. The book includes textual analyses of the works of Harriet Jacobs and Frederick Douglass as well as an examination of the treatment of Nat Turner, whose flesh was turned into "medicinal" grease.

Woodard died in 2008 and never saw The Delectable Negro published. It won the 2015 Lambda Literary Award for LGBT Studies.

== Overview ==
The Delectable Negro explores the homoeroticism of literal and metaphorical acts of human cannibalism coincident with slavery in the United States. Woodard writes that the consumption of Black men by White male enslavers was a "natural by-product of their physical, emotional, and spiritual hunger" for the Black man. Woodard argues that homoeroticism was also part of how Black Americans experienced their own consumption and not an unidirectional phenomenon, as it "emanated from black men toward White men and toward each other."

The book approaches the concept of consumption literally with documented cases of cannibalism and figuratively as a spiritual and societal phenomenon. Woodard defines consumption as a spectrum of practices, including sexual modes of consumption, flesh-seasoning rituals, institutionalized hunger, and soul harvesting. Woodard argues that cultural aspects of U.S. plantations were "based in parasitism and a dynamic of human consumption," building on Orlando Patterson's notion of slavery as a parasitic institution in Slavery and Social Death: A Comparative Study. Woodard identifies practices such as the systemic starvation of enslaved people as parasitic relationships that use Black bodies to fuel the construction of Whiteness.

== Contents ==
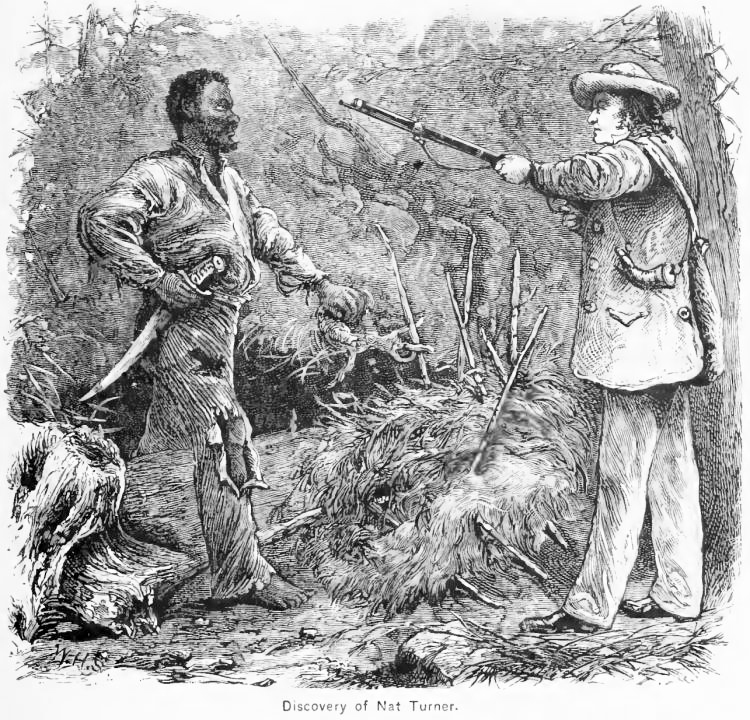
A 19th-century wood engraving of the capture of Nat Turner, whose body, Woodard argues, is continuously consumed, both literally and metaphorically.

Woodard draws on various critical methodologies and texts, including Works Progress Administration interviews, advertisements for runaways, and slave narratives. He writes that when Black Americans described instances of cannibalism, they "tried to understand why and how they had become so delectable, so erotically appetizing, to a nation and White populace that, at least rhetorically, denied and despised their humanity."

Woodard begins The Delectable Negro at the intersection of the transatlantic slave trade and the consumptive appetites of White people. While White cannibalism was widely reported in accounts of enslaved Africans from the 16th century up through the 19th, previous scholarship largely dismissed the accounts as superstition or "unfounded indigenous terrors." Woodard validates Black accounts, offering evidence of punishment rituals, including an instance of a slaveholder forcing enslaved people to eat the broiled ear of a member of their community. Woodard writes how in the autobiography The Interesting Narrative of the Life of Olaudah Equiano, Equiano's recurring fears of being cannibalized by the Europeans who captured him were intertwined with his homoerotic attachments to White men.

Woodard then examines a series of historical incidents where the enslavers' culture of honor is bolstered by the consumption and sexualized brutalization of enslaved people.

The third and fourth chapters of The Delectable Negro include close textual analyses of the works of Frederick Douglass and Harriet Jacobs. Woodard writes that Douglass described slavery "more than anyone else has, as a cannibalistic institution" and suggests that Douglass may have been raped while he was enslaved. Turning his focus to Jacobs' Incidents in the Life of a Slave Girl, Woodard argues for a "more fluid conception of gender and black consumption." He offers an original interpretation of Jacobs' character of Luke, arguing that the variance and fluidity of Luke's desires and gender enables him "to survive within a culture of consumption." Woodard also explores White women's roles inside "economies of power, sexuality, and gender consumption."

The final chapters of The Delectable Negro trace the notions of consumption to the modern era. Woodard approaches the historical figure of Nat Turner, whose flesh was rendered into "medicinal" grease, through William Styron's fictionalized 1967 novel The Confessions of Nat Turner. Woodard addresses Black intellectual critiques of the book and James Baldwin's defense of it. He links the heteronormativity and anxiety around homoeroticism evident within 1960s Black radical movements to the legacy of the rape of Black men during slavery.

Woodard locates the Black male interior as a site of hunger and violation. In describing the "suppressed history and politics of the black, male orifice," Woodard writes how the mouth and anus should be decoupled from sexual practice and instead be used to theorize Black interiority. The Delectable Negro reviews 20th-century representations of the Black male erotic interior, including the chain gang oral sex scene from Toni Morrison's novel Beloved. Woodard also outlines a genealogy of the uses of Black people as figures for a "politics of interiority."

== Posthumous publication ==
The author, Vincent Maurice Woodard (1971–2008), received his PhD from the University of Texas at Austin. He was a poet and an English professor at the University of Colorado Boulder. His first draft of The Delectable Negro, in 2005, was entitled Recovering the Black Male Womb: Slavery, Homoeroticism and Nineteenth-Century Racial Uplift. At a 2006 American Studies Association conference, Woodard delivered the paper "Blood Magic and Sorcery in the State Formation Archive", laying out the key terminology he would use in The Delectable Negro.

Woodard never saw the book published, having died in 2008. Following posthumous editing by Justin A. Joyce and Dwight A. McBride, The Delectable Negro was published by New York University Press in 2014. The book's foreword is by E. Patrick Johnson.

== Reception ==
In a Journal of Gender Studies book review, Rachel van Duyvenbode called The Delectable Negro a tour de force, writing that it would appeal to those "interested in the intersections of sexuality, language, and gender identities." Christopher Lloyd wrote in American Studies that the book as an "interruption into critical theory alone is itself worth celebrating." Carla Peterson called The Delectable Negro a "bold and brilliant book." Reviewer Justin Rogers-Cooper writes that Woodard develops "a 'transhistorical' approach as a lens to excavate the homoeroticism of slave life."

The Delectable Negro won the 2015 Lambda Literary Award for LGBT Studies.
