= Marc Acito =

American novelist

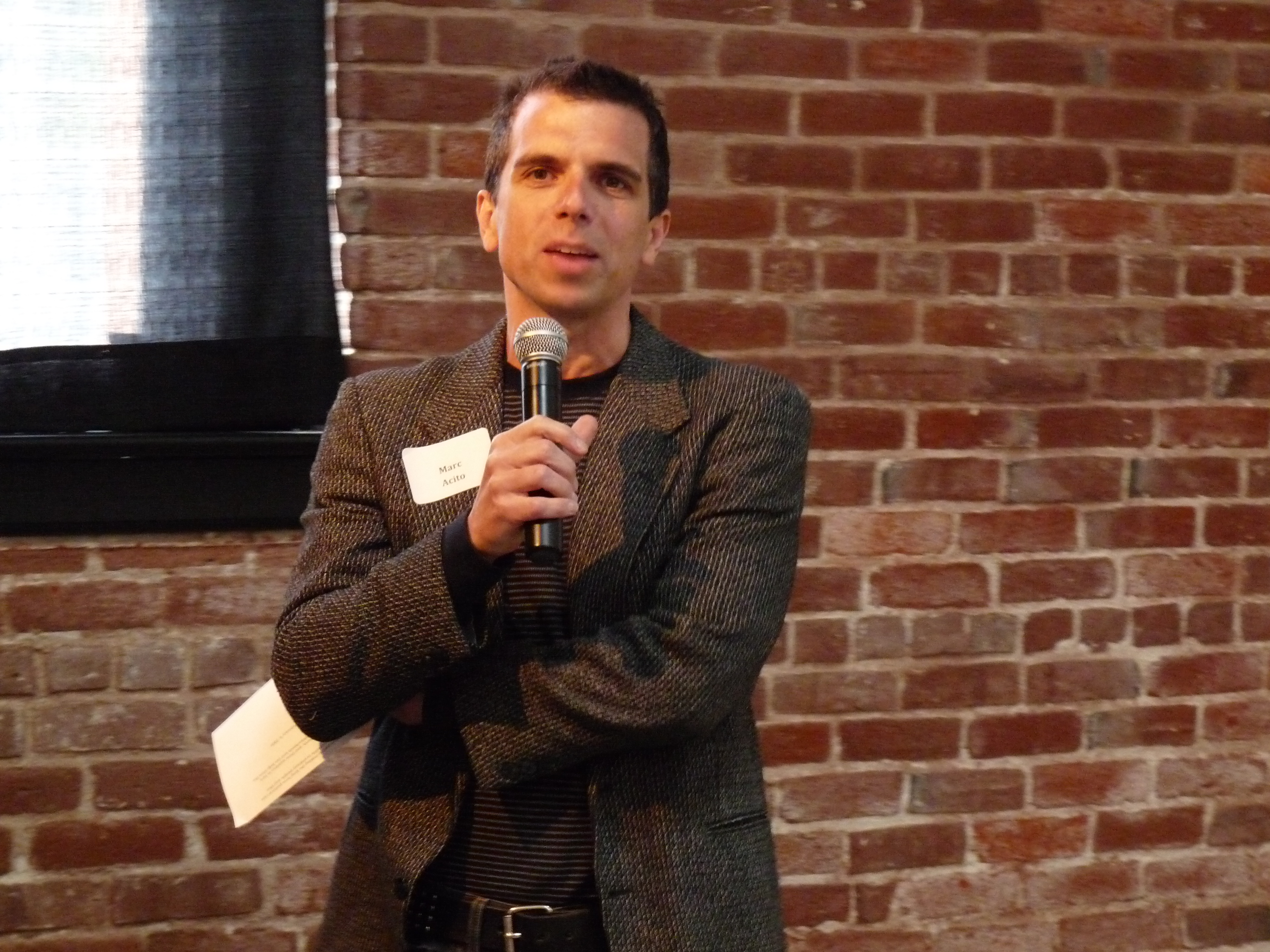
- Acito in 2009
- Born: January 11, 1966 (age 60); Bayonne, New Jersey, U.S.
- Education: Carnegie Mellon University; Colorado College (BA)
- Occupations: Playwright; novelist; humorist
- Spouse: Floyd Sklaver
- Website: marcacito.nyc

Marc Acito (born January 11, 1966) is an American playwright, novelist, and humorist.

== Early life ==
Born in Bayonne, New Jersey, Acito was raised in Westfield, New Jersey, and is a 1984 graduate of Westfield High School. He studied in the BFA musical theatre program at Carnegie Mellon University but left before graduation. In 1990 he received a bachelor's degree from Colorado College. In 2009, Colorado College awarded him an honorary doctorate.

== Early career ==
Acito began his career as a novelist and journalist. His comic novel How I Paid for College, won the Oregon Book Awards' 2005 Ken Kesey Award for Best Novel and was voted a 2005 "Teens Top Ten for favorite young adult book" of the American Library Association. In April 2008, Acito published Attack of the Theater People, as a sequel to How I Paid for College.

He is also the writer of the syndicated humor column "The Gospel According to Marc", which ran for four years in nineteen gay publications. His humorous essays have appeared in many publications including The New York Times (April 3, 2006) and Portland Monthly magazine (January 2007, February 2007) as well as on NPR's All Things Considered (June 2008 through February 2010).

== Theatrical career ==
In 2012, Acito won the Charles MacArthur Award for Outstanding New Play for Birds of a Feather, a comedy inspired by Roy and Silo, the same-sex male penguins in Central Park who raised a chick.

Acito wrote the libretto for the musical Allegiance, which won the 2012 Craig Noel Award for Outstanding New Musical after a record breaking run at San Diego's Old Globe Theater. ALLEGIANCE - A New Musical Inspired by a True Story opened on Broadway in November 2015 and starred George Takei and Lea Salonga.

In 2012, Acito also turned his novel How I Paid for College into a "one-man monologue with songs" that premiered at the Hub Theater in Fairfax, Virginia.

In 2014, his musical adaptation of E.M. Forster's A Room With a View was presented in Seattle at the 5th Avenue Theater. In 2015, Acito wrote the concert adaptation of Lerner & Loewe's Paint Your Wagon for New York City Center's Encores! series.

He is currently working on the libretto for a new musical commissioned by the 5th Avenue Theater. The musical, Dutch Master, was awarded a development grant by the National Alliance for Musical Theater. Also in the works is Chasing Rainbows, a musical based on the early childhood of Judy Garland, which premiered in December 2015 at Flat Rock Playhouse in North Carolina.

== Personal life ==
Acito lives in New York City with his husband Floyd Sklaver.
