= Betty Berzon Emerging Writer Award =

Early career award for LGBT+ writers

- Awarded for: Achievement by emerging LGBTQ+ writer
- Sponsored by: Lambda Literary Foundation (2013–2016); Publishing Triangle (2016-)
- Reward: US$1,000
- Established: 2013

The Betty Berzon Emerging Writer Award is an annual literary award, presented by Publishing Triangle to honor achievement by an emerging LGBTQ writer. The prize is presented to a writer who has shown exceptional talent and the promise of continued literary success and significance in the future.

From 2013 to 2016, the award was presented by Lambda Literary Foundation as a Lambda Literary Award, until taken over by Publishing Triangle. First presented by Publishing Triangle in 2017, the award was named in memory of American author and psychotherapist Betty Berzon, who won the fight to have the American Psychiatric Association declassify homosexuality as a mental illness, and contributed to LGBTQ advocacy throughout her lifetime. The award is sponsored by Berzon's widow, Teresa DeCrescenzo.

== Recipients ==
Award winners
Year	Recipient	Ref.
2013	Sassafras Lowrey	
2013	Carter Sickels	
2014	Imogen Binnie	
2014	Charles Rice-González	
2015	Anne Balay	
2015	Daisy Hernández	
2017	Chinelo Okparanta	
2018	Sarah Perry	
2019	Julian Randall	
2020	Oliver Baez Bendorf	
2021	Robert Fieseler	
2022	John Paul Brammer	
2023	Crisosto Apache	
2024	Hilary Zaid	
2025	Brittany Rogers	
2026	Mariah Rigg	

== See also ==
- Judith A. Markowitz Award for Exceptional New LGBTQ Writers
