= Andrea Barnet =

American author

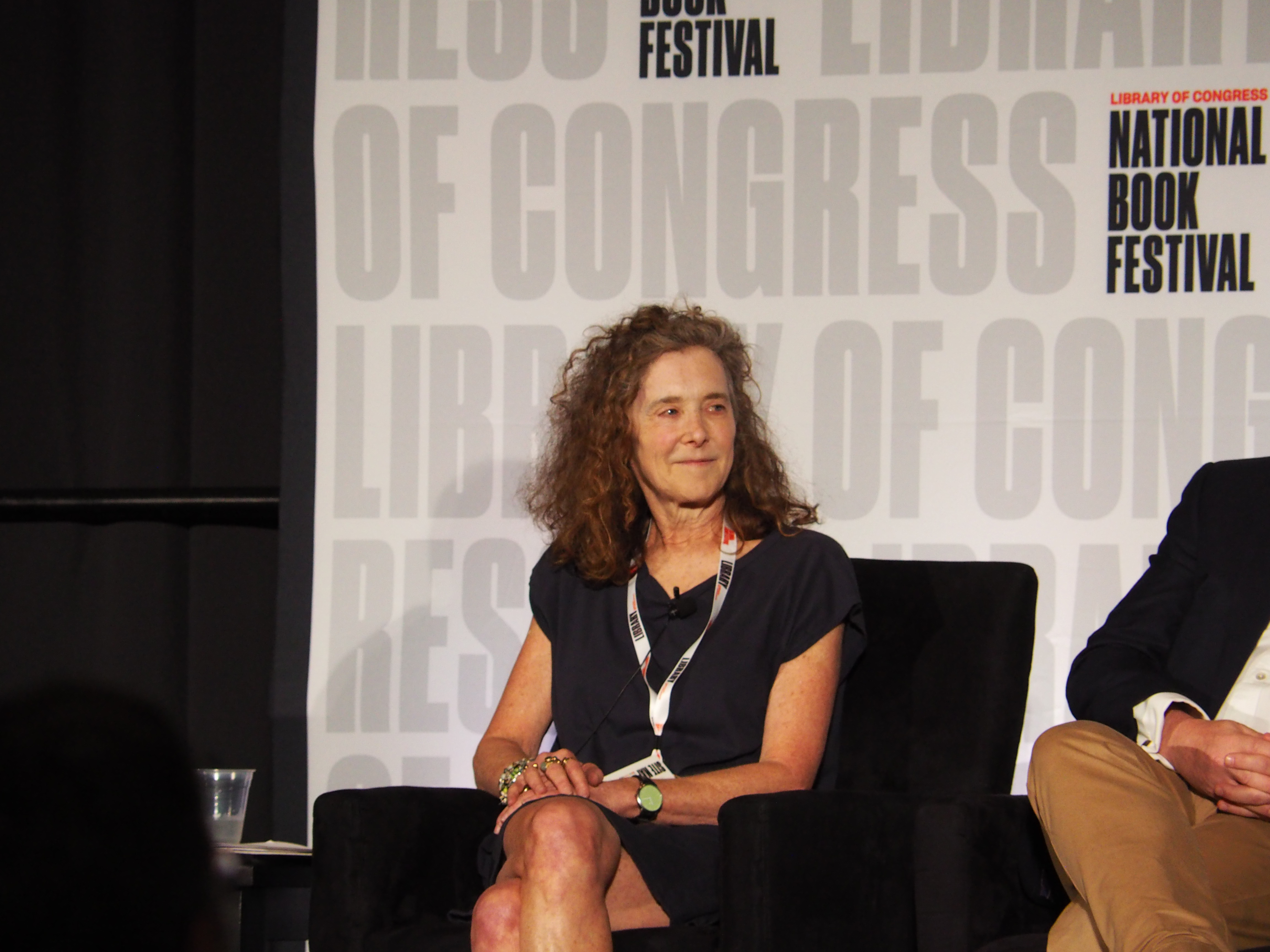
- Born: Boston, Massachusetts, U.S.
- Education: University of Pennsylvania
- Occupation: Writer
- Spouse: Kit White
- Children: 1
- Writing career
- Language: English
- Period: 2004 – present
- Notable works: All-Night Party (2004); Visionary Women (2018)
- Website: www.andreabarnet.com

Andrea Barnet is an American author.

== Biography ==
Andrea Barnet was born in Boston, Massachusetts. She got her education at the University of Pennsylvania. After college, Barnet worked as a reviewer for The New York Times Book Review for 25 years from 1985. She also produced work for publications such as Smithsonian, Harper's Bazaar, The Globe, Avenue, and Architectural Record.

She has written two books. Her second, Visionary Women, was a finalist for the 2019 PEN/Jacqueline Bograd Weld Award and won The Green Prize for Sustainable Literature, while the first was shortlisted for the 17th Lambda Literary Awards.

== Personal life ==
She is married to artist Kit White and they have one daughter. They live in New York.

== Bibliography ==
- Barnet, Andrea (2004-01-01). All-night Party: The Women of Bohemian Greenwich Village and Harlem, 1913-1930. Algonquin Books. ISBN 978-1-56512-381-6.
- Visionary Women: How Rachel Carson, Jane Jacobs, Jane Goodall and Alice Waters Changed Our World (2018)
