= Association for the Study of Law, Culture and the Humanities =

Scholarly association

The Association for the Study of Law, Culture and the Humanities is a scholarly association for interdisciplinary research in the fields of law, culture, and the humanities. Since the inaugural event at Georgetown Law in 1998, the organization has held an annual conference hosted by a different law school each year, and has published the journal Law, Culture and the Humanities since 2005.

== See also ==
- SEARCH, The National Consortium for Justice Information and Statistics
