= Evelyn C. White =

American writer and editor

- Born: 1954 (age 71–72); Chicago, Illinois, US
- Education: Wellesley College; Columbia University Graduate School of Journalism
- Alma mater: Harvard University
- Occupations: Writer; editor; journalist; guest speaker
- Writing career
- Genres: Fiction; novel; essay; biography
- Notable works: Black Women's Health Book; Alice Walker: A Life

Evelyn Corliss White (born March 29, 1954) is an American writer and editor. Her books include the collection Black Women's Health Book: Speaking for Ourselves and the biography Alice Walker: A Life.

== Early life and education ==
Evelyn C. White was born on March 29, 1954, in Chicago, Illinois, to Amanda Cantrells and Andrew S. White. She was one of five siblings. White grew up in a working-class neighborhood in Gary, Indiana, and attended Alain L Locke Elementary School.

After graduating from Wellesley College in 1976, she worked for a theatre company in Denmark. Returning to the United States, she studied theatre at the University of Washington and began writing professionally while living in Seattle. She graduated from Columbia University Graduate School of Journalism in 1985.

In 1991, White earned a master's degree in public administration from Harvard University.

== Career ==
White joined the staff of the San Francisco Chronicle in the mid-1980s. She published her first two books, Chain, Chain, Change: For Black Women in Abusive Relationships and Black Women's Health Book: Speaking for Ourselves, with Seal Press, a small feminist press based in Seattle, Washington.

Black Women's Health Book included chapters from Audre Lorde, Alice Walker, and Toni Morrison. Writing for the New York Times, Linda Villarosa observed that some of the book's topics were "unavoidably depressing" but noted that "when the essays hit home, they hit hard". Publishers Weekly summarized the book's 41 different writings as covering "the vast spectrum of the black women's health experience as patient, healer and witness". In the San Francisco Chronicle Patricia Holt concluded that the book "breaks the silence, bursts the taboos, and mends many hearts along the way".

While White was teaching at a writing center in Oregon, one of her students brought her into contact with the novelist Alice Walker, who had read newspaper articles that White had written for the San Francisco Chronicle. After a decade of White's work on Walker's biography, Alice Walker: A Life was published by Norton in 2004, with The New York Times calling it a "rich, complex story" and Publishers Weekly describing it as a "vibrant narrative".

White currently lives in Halifax, Nova Scotia, Canada, and has contributed to publications like The Coast, The Nova Scotia Advocate, Halifax Examiner.

== Bibliography ==
- White, Evelyn C. (1985). Chain, Chain, Change: For Black Women in Abusive Relationships. Seal Press. ISBN 9780931188251. OCLC 852661840.
- White, Evelyn C., ed. (1990). Black Women's Health Book: Speaking for Ourselves. Seal Press. ISBN 9780931188862.
- White, Evelyn C. (2004). Alice Walker: A Life. Norton. ISBN 9780393058918.
- White, Evelyn C.; Bealy, Joanne (2009). Every Goodbye Ain't Gone: A Photo Narrative of Black Heritage on Salt Spring Island. Dancing Crow Press. ISBN 9780973251913.

== Honors ==
- 1985: Christopher Trump award for " The Racial Development of Blind Black Children" [master's thesis]
