= Abigail Garner =

American author and advocate for children with LGBT parents

- Born: Minneapolis, Minnesota, United States
- Occupations: Author, advocate
- Writing career
- Subject: LGBT parenting

Abigail Garner is an American author and advocate for children with LGBT parents.

== Biography ==
Garner is the author of Families Like Mine, a compilation of interviews from more than 50 children of LGBT parents, and discusses a breadth of issues including AIDS, divorce and homophobia. She is the creator of a companion website to the book, FamiliesLikeMine.com, a resource for LGBT families. Her writing has appeared in a number of publications including a commentary in Newsweek.

Garner served on the board of the Minnesota/St. Paul chapter of PFLAG (Parents, Friends and Families of Lesbians and Gays). In addition, for six years she was on the board for the Twin Cities chapter of COLAGE.

Garner popularized the term "Queerspawn", a term children with gay parents call themselves, coined by Stefan Lynch, first director of COLAGE. She is a graduate of Wellesley College. Garner identifies as heterosexual, her father came out as gay when she was five years old.

== Bibliography ==
=== Books ===
- Garner, Abigail (2004-03-30). Families Like Mine: Children of Gay Parents Tell It Like It Is. HarperCollins. ISBN 9780060527570.

=== Book chapters ===
- Like Father, Like Daughter, in Cruz, Melissa de la; Dolby, Tom (2007-05-17). Girls Who Like Boys Who Like Boys. Penguin Group US. pp. 279–. ISBN 9781101213759.

=== Articles ===
- "Don't 'Protect' Me; Give Me Your Respect: Growing Up with a Gay Father Wasn't Easy-But Only Because Our Society Doesn't Accept Families like Mine". Newsweek. February 11, 2002. Archived from the original on 2015-03-29 – via HighBeam Research.
