= The Normal Heart (film) =

2014 film directed by Ryan Murphy

- Television release poster
- Genre: Drama
- Based on: The Normal Heart by Larry Kramer
- Screenplay by: Larry Kramer
- Directed by: Ryan Murphy
- Starring: Mark Ruffalo; Matt Bomer; Taylor Kitsch; Jim Parsons; Julia Roberts
- Music by: Cliff Martinez
- Country of origin: United States
- Original language: English

Production
- Executive producers: Ryan Murphy; Dante Di Loreto; Jason Blum; Brad Pitt; Dede Gardner
- Producer: Scott Ferguson
- Cinematography: Daniel Moder
- Editor: Adam Penn
- Running time: 132 minutes
- Production companies: Blumhouse Productions; Plan B Entertainment; Ryan Murphy Productions; 20th Century Fox Television; HBO Films

Original release
- Network: HBO
- Release: May 25, 2014

The Normal Heart is a 2014 American television drama film directed by Ryan Murphy and written by Larry Kramer, based on his 1985 play of the same name. The film stars Mark Ruffalo, Matt Bomer, Taylor Kitsch, Jim Parsons, Alfred Molina, Joe Mantello, Jonathan Groff, and Julia Roberts.

The film depicts the rise of the HIV/AIDS crisis in New York City between 1981 and 1984, as seen through the eyes of writer/activist Ned Weeks (Ruffalo), the founder of a prominent HIV advocacy group. Weeks prefers public confrontations to the calmer, more private strategies favored by his associates, friends, and closeted lover Felix Turner (Bomer). Their differences of opinion lead to arguments that threaten to undermine their shared goals.

It was released on DVD and Blu-ray on August 26, 2014.

== Plot ==
In the summer of 1981, Alexander "Ned" Weeks, an openly gay writer from New York City, travels to Fire Island to celebrate the birthday of his friend Craig Donner at a beach house. Other friends in attendance include Mickey Marcus and the charismatic Bruce Niles, who has recently begun dating Craig, who is young and appears to be in good health. While walking on the beach, however, Craig feels dizzy and collapses. Later, when blowing out the candles on his birthday cake, Craig begins to cough repeatedly.

While traveling back to New York City, Ned reads an article in The New York Times titled "Rare Cancer Diagnosed in 41 Homosexuals". Back in the city, he visits the offices of Dr. Emma Brookner, a physician who has seen many patients afflicted with symptoms of rare diseases that normally would be harmless unless their immune systems had been compromised. All of these cases seem to be appearing in gay men. In the waiting room, Ned meets Sanford, a patient whose face and hands are marked with skin lesions caused by Kaposi's sarcoma, a rare cancer. Brookner examines Ned, but finds that he does not have the symptoms of this disease. She asks Ned to help her raise awareness of this disease within the gay community.

Craig suddenly suffers violent convulsions and is rushed to the hospital with Ned, Mickey, and Bruce where he is later pronounced dead. Brookner recognizes Bruce, noting that he is the former boyfriend of another one of her patients who recently died. Ned organizes a gathering at his home where many local gay men are invited to hear Brookner share information about the disease. Though she lacks conclusive evidence, she states her belief that the illness is sexually transmissible and that they should all avoid having sex for the time being to prevent new transmissions. Most attendees question her belief. She notes that few medical journals appear interested in publishing anything on this disease which is mostly affecting homosexual men. Ned announces that he wants to start an organization to spread information about the disease and provide services to those who have been infected.

Brookner and Ned visit a local hospital where several of her sick patients are in critical condition with an illness that is now being referred to as gay-related immune deficiency (GRID). They stay in rooms that many hospital staff are afraid to enter for fear of contracting the disease. Ned, Bruce, Mickey, and several other friends including Tommy Boatwright establish a community organization called Gay Men's Health Crisis (GMHC). The organization sponsors fundraisers for research on the disease now called AIDS and establishes a telephone hotline, counseling, and other services. Over Ned's objections, they elect Bruce their president. Ned arranges for his older brother, lawyer Ben Weeks, to provide free legal advice to the GMHC. The two brothers are close, but there remains an underlying tension over Ben's lack of understanding of Ned's sexuality. Ned contacts gay New York Times reporter Felix Turner, hoping that he can use his media connections to publish more stories about the unfolding health crisis. Felix laments that it is difficult getting any mainstream newspapers to report much information on AIDS. After Felix recalls that he and Ned had a sexual tryst at Man's Country bathhouse, the two begin a romantic relationship.

The disease continues to spread and claim lives. Tommy begins a ritual of taking the contact information of his friends who have died from AIDS out of his Rolodex and adding them to a pile, which he describes as "cardboard tombstones." Bruce attempts to travel to Phoenix with his boyfriend Albert, who is dying, so that Albert can see his mother one more time. The airline refuses at first to fly the plane with sick Albert on board. When they do eventually get to Phoenix, Albert dies following a period of dementia. The hospital doctors refuse to examine him and issue a death certificate, and instead throw his body out with the garbage. Bruce bribes a funeral home to cremate his body without a death certificate as Albert's mother sobs in anguish.

Brookner attempts to obtain grant money to continue researching AIDS, but her efforts are rejected by government officials who do not see AIDS as a priority. Ned, meanwhile, is kicked out of GMHC for his combative and aggressive tactics to promote awareness of AIDS, which is causing tension within the group.

Felix comes down with symptoms and his body wastes away as the disease claims his life. Felix arranges for a will with the help of Ben, and leaves everything he has to Ned. The two state their love for one another at the hospital before Felix dies. Upon hearing of Felix's death, Tommy solemnly adds his Rolodex card to his growing pile. A few days later, Ned visits his alma mater, Yale University, where a Gay Week is being hosted by the students. He admires how young men and women are able to dance with one another openly, without fear of discrimination.

Information is displayed about the growing number of people developing AIDS, as Tommy's Rolodex pile continues to grow, eventually including Bruce.

== Cast ==
- Mark Ruffalo as Alexander "Ned" Weeks (alter ego for Larry Kramer) Ruffalo, who had a childhood friend who struggled with his homosexuality, first watched the play in 1986. When Ruffalo was initially offered the part of Ned in the film, he argued that a gay actor should have the role, but accepted it when Murphy insisted.
- Matt Bomer as Felix Turner (based on John Duka)
- Taylor Kitsch as Bruce Niles (based on Paul Popham)
- Jim Parsons as Tommy Boatwright (based on Rodger McFarlane)
- Alfred Molina as Ben Weeks (based on Arthur Kramer)
- Julia Roberts as Dr. Emma Brookner (based on Dr. Linda Laubenstein)
- Joe Mantello as Michael R. "Mickey" Marcus
- BD Wong as Buzzy
- Jonathan Groff as Craig Donner
- Stephen Spinella as Sanford
- Finn Wittrock as Albert
- Denis O'Hare as Hiram Keebler
- Corey Stoll as John Bruno
- Danielle Ferland as Estelle
- Frank De Julio as Nick
- Adam B. Shapiro as Bella

== Production ==
In August 2011, Ryan Murphy said in an interview with Deadline Hollywood that he had optioned The Normal Heart and intended to produce the film version, starring Mark Ruffalo "and maybe Julia Roberts". The Hollywood Reporter confirmed the film news in January 2012, adding Alec Baldwin, Matt Bomer, and Jim Parsons to the previously announced cast. In March 2013, Taylor Kitsch joined the cast. In April 2013, the casting of actors Jonathan Groff and Joe Mantello was announced. In May 2013, it was announced that Alfred Molina would be replacing Alec Baldwin. Both Parsons and Mantello had starred in the 2011 Broadway revival, although Parsons was the only actor to reprise his role.

Murphy stated that he created this film, despite the play from which it derives being written in the 1980s, due to fears that people born after the 1980s AIDS crisis would not remember its lessons. The main producers were HBO & Plan B, Brad Pitt's production company.

=== Filming ===
Principal photography began on June 8, 2013, in New York City. On July 12, the crew was spotted shooting the film in Little Italy. During the course of filming, production was temporarily suspended to allow some of the actors to change their physical appearances; Bomer lost 40 pounds to show the ravages of AIDS on his character.

== Release ==
The Normal Heart debuted on HBO on May 25, 2014, after an earlier theatrical screening at the Inside Out Film and Video Festival in Toronto on May 23, 2014.

=== Home media ===
The Normal Heart was released on DVD and Blu-ray on August 26, 2014.

== Reception ==
=== Critical response ===
The film received widespread critical acclaim, with praise for Kramer's screenplay, its drama, moral messages, production values, and the performances of the cast. Review aggregation website Rotten Tomatoes gives the film a score of 94% based on 50 reviews, with an average score of 7.72/10. The site's critics consensus reads: "Thanks to Emmy-worthy performances from a reputable cast, The Normal Heart is not only a powerful, heartbreaking drama, but also a vital document of events leading up to and through the early AIDS crisis." Metacritic, which assigns a weighted average score to reviews from mainstream critics, gives the film a score of 85 out of 100, based on 33 reviews, indicating "universal acclaim".

Peter Travers of Rolling Stone awarded the film with a 3.5/4 and praised the film, "Written, directed and acted with a passion that radiates off the screen, The Normal Heart is drama at its most incendiary, a blunt instrument that is also poetic and profound. As gay men in crisis, Taylor Kitsch, Jim Parsons and Joe Mantello (who played Ned onstage) all excel. But it's Kramer, still raging over what's not being done, who tears at your heart." Ellen Gray of the Philadelphia Daily News commended "And though the supporting cast members are all good (Parsons particularly so), it's Kramer's fury, channeled through Ruffalo's manic energy as the writer's alter-ego Ned Weeks, that keeps The Normal Heart beating and preserves a horrific bit of all too recent history not in amber, but in anger."

Murphy's direction received mixed reviews from critics. Brian Lowry of Variety criticized Murphy's direction and the story's transition from stage to screen: "Murphy being Murphy, he can't resist throwing in moments that drift toward an American Horror Story vibe, such as a subway sequence where dramatic lighting flashes in and out on a lesion-pocked face. The translation from stage to screen also yields speeches that probably played better live, although the director has for the most part opened up the Tony-winning material into movie form," although he particularly hailed The Normal Heart as "a character-oriented drama with theatrical talent and values that would face challenges finding much purchase at the modern-day multiplex. The result is a movie, for mostly better and sometimes worse, that wears its heart on its sleeve." Maureen Ryan of The Huffington Post also criticized Murphy's direction, writing: "But if you do watch the film, just be aware that every few minutes you may wish that someone — anyone — other than Murphy had directed it. Murphy is a self-indulgent director and not particularly rigorous or disciplined. He serves his own muse, not necessarily the needs of the material, and though it's a classic, Kramer's play is also unwieldy and outright clumsy at time."

TVLine named Bomer the "Performer of the Week" for his performance.

== Accolades ==
Year	Award	Category	Nominee(s)	Result	Ref.
2014	Critics' Choice TV Awards	Best Movie		Won	
2014	Critics' Choice TV Awards	Best Actor in a Movie/Miniseries	Mark Ruffalo	Nominated	
2014	Critics' Choice TV Awards	Best Supporting Actor in a Movie/Miniseries	Matt Bomer	Won	
2014	Critics' Choice TV Awards	Best Supporting Actor in a Movie/Miniseries	Joe Mantello	Nominated	
2014	Critics' Choice TV Awards	Best Supporting Actress in a Movie/Miniseries	Julia Roberts	Nominated	
2014	Humanitas Prize	90 Minute or Longer Network or Syndicated Television	Larry Kramer	Won	
2014	Online Film & Television Association Awards	Best Motion Picture		Won	
2014	Online Film & Television Association Awards	Best Actor in a Motion Picture or Miniseries	Mark Ruffalo	Won	
2014	Online Film & Television Association Awards	Best Supporting Actor in a Motion Picture or Miniseries	Matt Bomer	Won	
2014	Online Film & Television Association Awards	Best Supporting Actor in a Motion Picture or Miniseries	Taylor Kitsch	Nominated	
2014	Online Film & Television Association Awards	Best Supporting Actor in a Motion Picture or Miniseries	Joe Mantello	Nominated	
2014	Online Film & Television Association Awards	Best Supporting Actor in a Motion Picture or Miniseries	Alfred Molina	Nominated	
2014	Online Film & Television Association Awards	Best Supporting Actor in a Motion Picture or Miniseries	Jim Parsons	Nominated	
2014	Online Film & Television Association Awards	Best Supporting Actress in a Motion Picture or Miniseries	Julia Roberts	Nominated	
2014	Online Film & Television Association Awards	Best Direction of a Motion Picture or Miniseries	Ryan Murphy	Won	
2014	Online Film & Television Association Awards	Best Writing of a Motion Picture or Miniseries	Larry Kramer	Won	
2014	Online Film & Television Association Awards	Best Ensemble in a Motion Picture or Miniseries		Won	
2014	Online Film & Television Association Awards	Best Cinematography in a Non-Series		Nominated	
2014	Online Film & Television Association Awards	Best Costume Design in a Non-Series		Nominated	
2014	Online Film & Television Association Awards	Best Editing in a Non-Series		Nominated	
2014	Online Film & Television Association Awards	Best Makeup/Hairstyling in a Non-Series		Nominated	
2014	Online Film & Television Association Awards	Best Music in a Non-Series		Nominated	
2014	Online Film & Television Association Awards	Best Production Design in a Non-Series		Nominated	
2014	Online Film & Television Association Awards	Best Sound in a Non-Series		Nominated	
2014	Primetime Emmy Awards	Outstanding Television Movie	Ryan Murphy, Dante Di Loreto, Jason Blum, Brad Pitt, Dede Gardner, Mark Ruffalo, Alexis Martin Woodall, and Scott Ferguson	Won	
2014	Primetime Emmy Awards	Outstanding Lead Actor in a Miniseries or Movie	Mark Ruffalo	Nominated	
2014	Primetime Emmy Awards	Outstanding Supporting Actor in a Miniseries or Movie	Matt Bomer	Nominated	
2014	Primetime Emmy Awards	Outstanding Supporting Actor in a Miniseries or Movie	Joe Mantello	Nominated	
2014	Primetime Emmy Awards	Outstanding Supporting Actor in a Miniseries or Movie	Alfred Molina	Nominated	
2014	Primetime Emmy Awards	Outstanding Supporting Actor in a Miniseries or Movie	Jim Parsons	Nominated	
2014	Primetime Emmy Awards	Outstanding Supporting Actress in a Miniseries or Movie	Julia Roberts	Nominated	
2014	Primetime Emmy Awards	Outstanding Directing for a Miniseries or Movie	Ryan Murphy	Nominated	
2014	Primetime Emmy Awards	Outstanding Writing for a Miniseries or Movie	Larry Kramer	Nominated	
2014	Primetime Creative Arts Emmy Awards	Outstanding Casting for a Miniseries or Movie	Amanda Mackey and Cathy Sandrich Gelfond	Nominated	
2014	Primetime Creative Arts Emmy Awards	Outstanding Cinematography for a Miniseries or Movie	Danny Moder	Nominated	
2014	Primetime Creative Arts Emmy Awards	Outstanding Costumes for a Miniseries, Movie or a Special	Daniel Orlandi, Gail A. Fitzgibbons, Hartsell Taylor, and Maria Tortu	Nominated	
2014	Primetime Creative Arts Emmy Awards	Outstanding Hairstyling for a Miniseries or a Movie	Chris Clark, Joe Whitmeyer, Valerie Gladstone, Frida Ardottir, and Lyndell Quiyou	Nominated	
2014	Primetime Creative Arts Emmy Awards	Outstanding Makeup (Non-Prosthetic)	Eryn Krueger Mekash, Sherri Berman Laurence, Nicky Pattison, LuAnn Claps, Mike Mekash, and Carla White	Won	
2014	Primetime Creative Arts Emmy Awards	Outstanding Prosthetic Makeup	Eryn Krueger Mekash, Sherri Berman Laurence, Christien Tinsley, Mary Anne Spano, James Sarzotti, and Nicky Pattison	Nominated	
2014	Primetime Creative Arts Emmy Awards	Outstanding Picture Editing for a Miniseries or Movie	Adam Penn	Nominated	
2014	Women's Image Network Awards	Actress Made for Television Movie / Mini-Series	Julia Roberts	Nominated	
2015	American Cinema Editors Awards	Best Edited Miniseries or Motion Picture for Television	Adam Penn	Won	
2015	Artios Awards	Outstanding Achievement in Casting – Television Movie/Mini Series	Amanda Mackey, Cathy Sandrich Gelfond, and Susanne C. Scheel	Nominated	
2015	Cinema Audio Society Awards	Outstanding Achievement in Sound Mixing for Television Movies and Mini-Series	Drew Kunin, Joe Earle, Doug Andham, Beauxregard Neylen, and Scott Curtis	Nominated	
2015	Costume Designers Guild Awards	Outstanding Made for Television Movie or Miniseries	Daniel Orlandi	Nominated	
2015	Directors Guild of America Awards	Outstanding Directorial Achievement in Movies for Television and Miniseries	Ryan Murphy	Nominated	
2015	Dorian Awards	TV Drama of the Year		Won	
2015	Dorian Awards	TV Performance of the Year – Actor	Matt Bomer	Nominated	
2015	Dorian Awards	TV Performance of the Year – Actor	Mark Ruffalo	Nominated	
2015	Dorian Awards	TV Director of the Year	Ryan Murphy	Nominated	
2015	GLAAD Media Awards	Outstanding TV Movie or Mini-Series		Won	
2015	Golden Globe Awards	Best Miniseries or Motion Picture Made for Television		Nominated	
2015	Golden Globe Awards	Best Actor in a Miniseries or Motion Picture Made for Television	Mark Ruffalo	Nominated	
2015	Golden Globe Awards	Best Supporting Actor in a Series, Miniseries or Motion Picture Made for Television	Matt Bomer	Won	
2015	Golden Reel Awards	Best Sound Editing – Long Form Dialogue and ADR in Television	Gary Megregian and Jason Krane	Nominated	
2015	Golden Reel Awards	Best Sound Editing - Long Form Sound Effects and Foley in Television	Gary Megregian, Timothy A. Cleveland, John Petaja, Scott Curtis, Paul J. Diller, Dawn Lunsford, and Alicia Stevenson	Nominated	
2015	Gracie Awards	Outstanding Female Actor in a Supporting Role – Drama	Julia Roberts	Won	
2015	Guild of Music Supervisors Awards	Best Music Supervision – Television Long Form and Movies	P.J. Bloom	Won	
2015	Make-Up Artists and Hair Stylists Guild Awards	Best Period and/or Character Hair Styling – Television Mini-Series or Motion Picture Made for Television	Chris Clark and Joseph Whitmeyer	Nominated	
2015	Make-Up Artists and Hair Stylists Guild Awards	Best Period and/or Character Makeup – Television Mini-Series or Motion Picture Made for Television	Eryn Krueger Mekash and Sherri Berman Laurence	Nominated	
2015	Producers Guild of America Awards	David L. Wolper Award for Outstanding Producer of Long-Form Television	Jason Blum, Dante Di Loreto, Scott Ferguson, Dede Gardner, Alexis Martin Woodall, Ryan Murphy, Brad Pitt, and Mark Ruffalo	Nominated	
2015	Producers Guild of America Awards	Stanley Kramer Award	Jason Blum, Dante Di Loreto, Scott Ferguson, Dede Gardner, Alexis Martin Woodall, Ryan Murphy, Brad Pitt, and Mark Ruffalo	Won	
2015	Satellite Awards	Best Motion Picture Made for Television		Nominated	
2015	Satellite Awards	Best Actor in a Miniseries or a Motion Picture Made for Television	Mark Ruffalo	Won	
2015	Satellite Awards	Best Actor in a Supporting Role in a Series, Miniseries or Motion Picture Made for Television	Matt Bomer	Nominated	
2015	Screen Actors Guild Awards	Outstanding Performance by a Male Actor in a Television Movie or Miniseries	Mark Ruffalo	Won	
2015	Screen Actors Guild Awards	Outstanding Performance by a Female Actor in a Television Movie or Miniseries	Julia Roberts	Nominated	
2015	Television Academy Honors			Honored	
2015	Writers Guild of America Awards	Long Form – Adapted	Larry Kramer – Based on his play	Nominated	

== Planned sequel ==
As of 2015, a follow-up/sequel to the film written by Larry Kramer was in development at HBO. Ryan Murphy was on board to return as director. It was to chronicle the events of the ongoing HIV-AIDS crisis from 1987 through the 1990s. Kramer finished the screenplay in 2015 and gave details, including it would begin directly after the first film ended and depict Ned Weeks regaining his footing in the gay community after Felix's death, eventually founding ACT UP. The character of Tommy Boatwright would have had a larger role. The film was ultimately never produced before Kramer's death in 2020.

Kramer had previously penned a stage sequel to the original play, titled The Destiny of Me.

== See also ==
- 2014 in American television
- And the Band Played On (1993) — An HBO film also regarding the early years of the HIV/AIDS crisis in the United States
