= Linda Laubenstein =

American medical researcher (1947–1992)

- Born: May 21, 1947; Boston, Massachusetts, U.S.
- Died: August 15, 1992 (aged 45); Chatham, Massachusetts, U.S.
- Education: Barnard College; New York University
- Medical career
- Profession: Physician
- Field: Hematology; oncology
- Institutions: New York University Medical Center
- Sub-specialties: HIV/AIDS
- Research: Kaposi's sarcoma

Linda Jane Laubenstein (May 21, 1947 – August 15, 1992) was an American physician and early HIV/AIDS researcher. She was among the first doctors in the United States to recognize the AIDS epidemic of the early 1980s; she co-authored the first article linking AIDS with Kaposi's sarcoma.

Laubenstein was raised in Barrington, Rhode Island, where a childhood bout of polio left her paraplegic and using a wheelchair for the rest of her life. She graduated from Barnard College in 1969 and received her medical degree from New York University School of Medicine, where she specialized in hematology and oncology. She went on to become a clinical professor before leaving to focus on treating AIDS patients in her private practice. In addition to her medical work, she was an outspoken AIDS activist and co-founded a non-profit organization, Multitasking, which provided employment to people with AIDS.

After Laubenstein's death in 1992, aged 45, the New York State Department of Health established an award named after her for HIV/AIDS physicians. She was also memorialized in Larry Kramer's play The Normal Heart and its subsequent film adaptation.

== Early life ==
Linda Laubenstein was born on May 21, 1947, in Boston, Massachusetts, to Priscilla and George Laubenstein. She grew up in Barrington, Rhode Island. Her mother worked as a special-education preschool teacher, while her father worked as a purchasing agent for Providence Gas Company. As a child, she had severe asthma and contracted polio at the age of five. She was placed in an iron lung for three months to prevent respiratory failure and was left paraplegic; she would use a wheelchair for the rest of her life. Because she was unable to physically attend elementary school, an intercom was set up from her classroom to her home. Her high school did not have an elevator, so when she needed to attend classes on the second floor, members of the school's football team would carry her wheelchair up and down the stairs. She chose to attend Barnard College because the campus was accessible for wheelchair users. Aspiring to become a doctor, she took mostly science classes. She went on to study at the New York University School of Medicine, receiving her M.D. in 1973 and completing her internship, residency and fellowship by 1978.

== Career ==
A specialist in hematology and oncology, and clinical professor at the New York University Medical Center, Laubenstein was one of the first in the United States to recognize the appearance of the AIDS epidemic. While working in private practice in New York City, she observed a sudden increase in the number of cases of Kaposi's sarcoma—a rare cancer that would later be identified as an AIDS-defining illness—in young gay men with immune deficiencies. With Alvin Friedman-Kien, a dermatologist, she co-authored the first published article on the appearance of Kaposi's sarcoma in gay men. The first patient she diagnosed with Kaposi's sarcoma, in 1979, was a gay man with a generalized rash and enlarged lymph nodes; two weeks later, a colleague asked her to see a second patient, another gay man, with the same disease. Both men turned out to be friends with Gaëtan Dugas – often called the "patient zero" of HIV/AIDS in North America (although more recent studies have demonstrated that he did not bring the virus to the continent)) – who the men told Laubenstein had a similar rash. In 1981, when Dugas, a Canadian, heard about Kaposi's sarcoma, he traveled to New York from Montreal to consult with Laubenstein and Friedman-Kien and visited their practice for monthly chemotherapy treatments. By 1982, Laubenstein had treated 62 patients with Kaposi's sarcoma. She later left her university position to focus on treating AIDS patients in her private practice.

Laubenstein co-founded the Kaposi's Sarcoma Research Fund in 1983. The same year, she and Friedman-Kien arranged the first national-scale medical conference on AIDS at New York University. A collection of research presented at the conference was published in 1984 in a volume titled AIDS: The Epidemic of Kaposi's Sarcoma and Opportunistic Infections, edited by Laubenstein and Friedman-Kien. In 1986, she and Jeffrey B. Greene founded a non-profit organization, Multitasking. The organization, which provided office services to businesses, employed AIDS patients who had lost their jobs because of the disease and helped them to find new positions. Greene called Laubenstein "the ultimate AIDS physician" because of the care she provided to her patients, often making house calls in her wheelchair. At a time when many physicians refused to see AIDS patients, Laubenstein's colleague James Wernz, an oncologist, affectionately noted that she was sometimes referred to as "bitch on wheels" because of her "pushy" attitude towards other doctors.

Laubenstein was also an outspoken AIDS activist and criticized the American government for what she saw as a reluctance to combat the AIDS epidemic. She was also critical of the Catholic Church for its treatment of lesbians and gay men. Some of her opinions caused controversy among other gay activists, such as her call to close gay bathhouses to discourage unsafe sexual behaviors and therefore reduce HIV transmission. Playwright Larry Kramer, who befriended Laubenstein after she cared for his partner, who died from AIDS, said that she was "probably the first doctor to suggest that we [gay men] stop having sex altogether".

== Health problems and death ==
Laubenstein developed appendicitis in 1984 and was afraid to undergo surgery because of the risk that general anesthesia would pose to her lungs, already compromised from polio. After the operation, her surgeons had trouble weaning her off the ventilator and she had a psychotic breakdown requiring admission to a psychiatric hospital. The psychiatrists theorized that her hallucinations were caused by hypoxia from the anesthesia. In 1990, she fell ill with a combination of asthma, gastroenteritis and respiratory failure, though she continued to work. She started taking corticosteroids for her respiratory problems, which were exacerbated by allergies to her two pet cats, and was unable to wean herself off them despite experiencing side effects.

She died unexpectedly at the age of 45 on August 15, 1992, while staying at her family's home in Chatham, Massachusetts. An autopsy was ordered and the cause of her death was determined to be a heart attack. She was survived by her parents and a brother, Peter.

== Legacy ==
Larry Kramer's play The Normal Heart, about the AIDS epidemic of the early 1980s in New York City, features a physician who uses a wheelchair, Emma Brookner, who is based on Laubenstein. Kramer, an activist as well as a playwright, hoped that his portrayal of Laubenstein would "enshrine her legacy forever". Since the play opened in 1984, the character has been played by Ellen Barkin in a Broadway production and Julia Roberts in a film adaptation.

In his book Women and Gay Men in the Postwar Period, John Portmann credits Laubenstein with "enrich[ing] the entire gay community through her academic research and social activism". Each year, the New York State Department of Health awards the Dr. Linda Laubenstein HIV Clinical Excellence Award to physicians who "are distinguished by their compassionate manner and wholehearted involvement in the effort to provide comprehensive care for persons with HIV/AIDS".

Her collected papers are at the Schlesinger Library, Radcliffe College.

== Selected published works ==
- Laubenstein, Linda J.; Friedman-Kien, Alvin (1984). AIDS: The Epidemic of Kaposis Sarcoma and Opportunistic Infections. New York: Masson. ISBN 0893522171.
