= Larry Kramer =

American playwright and gay rights activist (1935–2020)

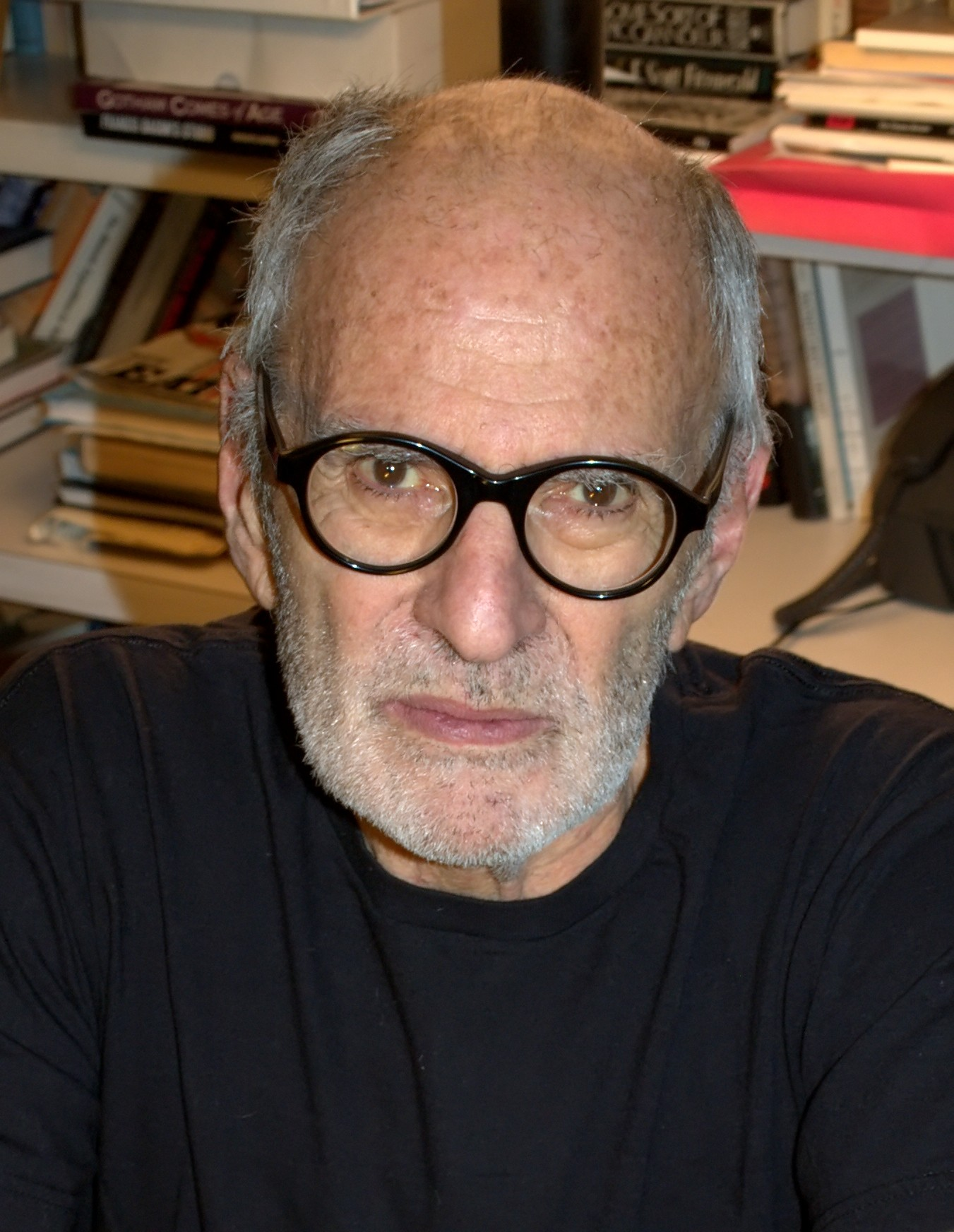
- Kramer in 2010
- Born: Laurence David Kramer; June 25, 1935; Bridgeport, Connecticut, U.S.
- Died: May 27, 2020 (aged 84); New York City, U.S.
- Education: Yale University (BA)
- Occupations: Screenwriter; novelist; essayist; playwright
- Spouse: David Webster (m. 2013)
- Relatives: Arthur Kramer (brother)
- Writing career
- Years active: 1960s–2020
- Subjects: Gay community; AIDS activism

Laurence David Kramer (June 25, 1935 – May 27, 2020) was an American playwright, author, film producer, public health advocate, and gay rights activist. He began his career rewriting scripts while working for Columbia Pictures, which led him to London, where he worked with United Artists. There he wrote the screenplay for the film Women in Love (1969) and received an Academy Award nomination for his work.

In 1978, Kramer introduced a controversial and confrontational style in his novel Faggots, which earned mixed reviews and emphatic denunciations from elements within the gay community for Kramer's portrayal of what he characterized as shallow, promiscuous gay relationships in the 1970s.

Kramer witnessed the spread of the disease later known as Acquired Immunodeficiency Syndrome (AIDS) among his friends in 1980. He co-founded the Gay Men's Health Crisis (GMHC), which has become the world's largest private organization assisting people living with AIDS. Kramer grew frustrated with bureaucratic paralysis and the apathy of gay men to the AIDS crisis, and wished to engage in further action than the social services GMHC provided. He expressed his frustration by writing a play titled The Normal Heart, produced at The Public Theater in New York City in 1985.

His political activism continued with the founding of the AIDS Coalition to Unleash Power (ACT UP) in 1987, an influential direct action protest organization with the aim of gaining more public action to fight the AIDS crisis. ACT UP has been widely credited with changing public health policy and the perception of people living with AIDS, and with raising awareness of HIV and AIDS-related diseases.

Kramer was a finalist for the Pulitzer Prize for his play The Destiny of Me (1992), and he was a two-time recipient of the Obie Award.

== Early life ==
Laurence David Kramer was born in Bridgeport, Connecticut, the younger of two children. His mother, Rea (née Wishengrad), worked as a shoe store employee, teacher, and social worker for Red Cross. His father, George Kramer, worked as a government attorney. His older brother, Arthur Kramer was born in 1927. The family was Jewish.

Kramer was considered an "unwanted child" by his parents, who struggled to find work during the American Great Depression. When the family moved to Maryland, they found themselves in a much lower socioeconomic bracket than that of Kramer's high school peers. Kramer had become sexually involved with a male friend in junior high school. His father wanted him to marry a woman with money and pressured him to become a member of Pi Tau Pi, a Jewish fraternity.

Kramer's father, older brother Arthur, and two uncles were alumni of Yale University. Kramer enrolled at Yale College in 1953, where he had difficulty adjusting. He felt lonely, and earned lower grades than those to which he was accustomed. He attempted suicide by an overdose of aspirin because he felt like he was the "only gay student on campus". The experience left him determined to explore his sexuality and set him on the path to fight "for gay people's worth". The next semester, he had an affair with his German professor – his first requited romantic relationship with a man. Kramer enjoyed the Yale Glee Club during his remaining time at Yale, and he graduated in 1957 with a degree in English. He served in the U.S. Army Reserve before beginning his film writing and production career.

== Career ==
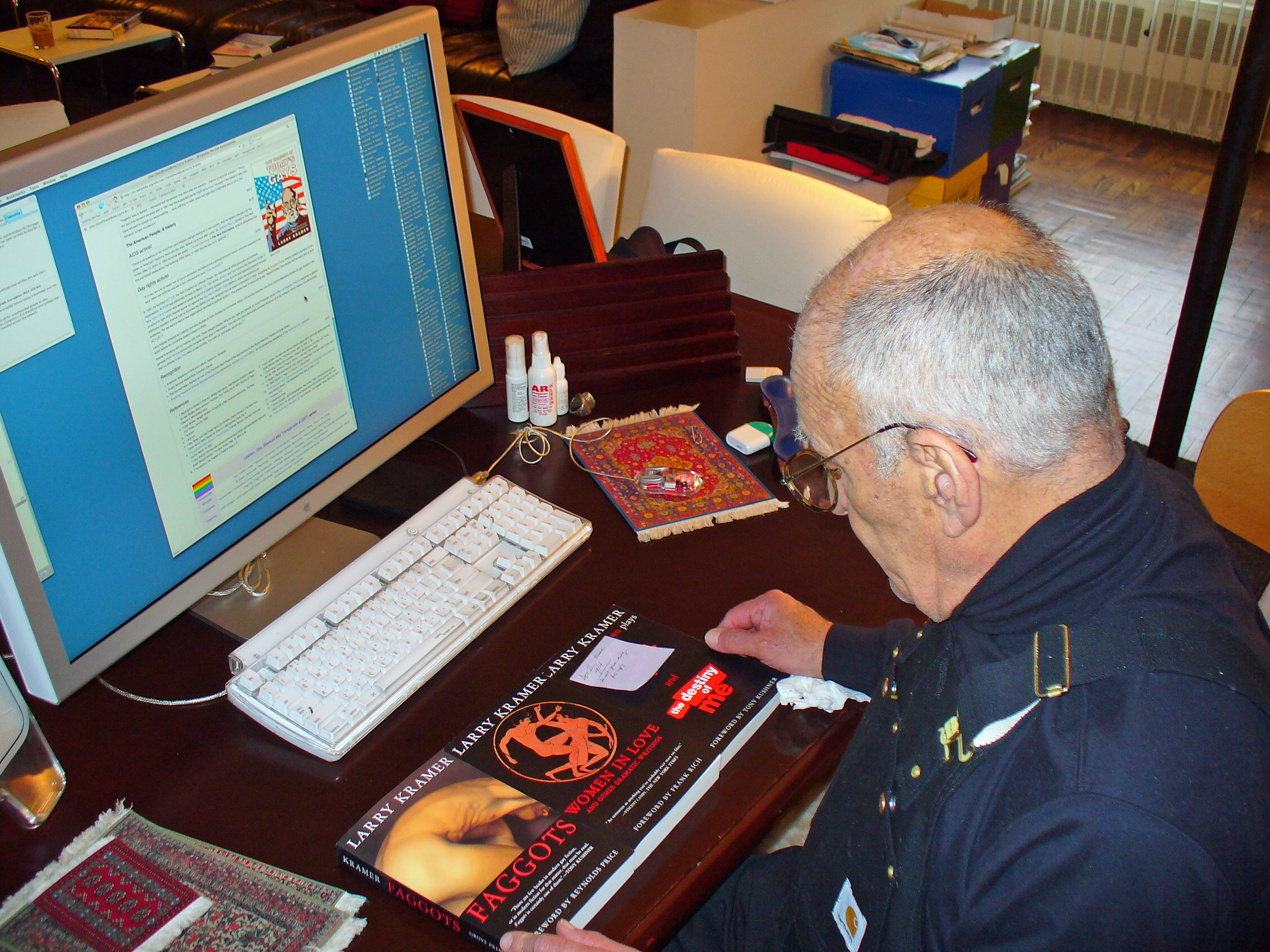
Kramer at home in 2007, reviewing the new Grove Press editions of his work. His Wikipedia article is shown on the computer.

=== Early writings ===
According to Kramer, every drama he wrote derived from a desire to understand love's nature and its obstacles. Kramer became involved with movie production at age 23 by taking a job as a Teletype operator at Columbia Pictures, agreeing to the position only because the machine was across the hall from the president's office. Eventually, he won a position in the story department reworking scripts. His first writing credit was as a dialogue writer for Here We Go Round the Mulberry Bush, a teen sex comedy. He followed that with the 1969 screenplay Women in Love, an adaptation of D. H. Lawrence's novel, which was nominated for an Academy Award. He next penned what Kramer later referred to as (the) "only thing I'm truly ashamed of", the 1973 musical remake of Frank Capra's Lost Horizon, a notorious critical and commercial failure with a screenplay based very closely on Capra's film. Kramer later said that his well-negotiated fee for this work, skillfully invested by his brother, made him financially self-sufficient during the 1980s and 1990s.

Kramer then began to integrate homosexual themes into his work, and tried writing for the stage. He wrote Sissies' Scrapbook in 1973 (later rewritten and retitled as Four Friends), a dramatic play about four friends, one of whom is gay, and their dysfunctional relationships. Kramer called it a play about "cowardice and the inability of some men to grow up, leave the emotional bondage of male collegiate camaraderie, and assume adult responsibilities". The play was first produced in a theater set up in an old YMCA gymnasium on 53rd Street and Eighth Avenue called the Playwrights Horizons. Live theater moved him to believing that writing for the stage was what he wanted to do. Although the play was given a somewhat favorable review by The New York Times, it was closed by the producer and Kramer was so distraught that he decided never to write for the stage again, later stating, "You must be a masochist to work in the theater and a sadist to succeed on its stages."

Kramer then wrote A Minor Dark Age, which was never produced. Frank Rich, in the foreword to a Grove Press collection of Kramer's lesser known works, wrote that the "dreamlike quality of the writing is haunting" in Dark Age, and that its themes, such as the exploration of the difference between sex and passion, "are staples of his entire output" that would portend his future work, including the 1978 novel Faggots.

=== Faggots ===
In 1978, Kramer delivered the final of four drafts of a novel that he wrote about the fast lifestyle of the gay men on Fire Island and in Manhattan. In Faggots, the primary character was modeled on himself, a man who is unable to find love while encountering the drugs and emotionless sex in the trendy bars and discos. He stated his inspiration for the novel: "I wanted to be in love. Almost everybody I knew felt the same way. I think most people, at some level, wanted what I was looking for, whether they pooh-poohed it or said that we can't live like the straight people or whatever excuses they gave." Kramer researched the book, talking to many men, and visiting various establishments. As he interviewed people, he heard a common question: "Are you writing a negative book? Are you going to make it positive? ... I began to think, 'My God, people must really be conflicted about the lives they're leading.' And that was true. I think people were guilty about all the promiscuity and all the partying."

The novel caused an uproar in the community it portrayed; it was taken off the shelves of the Oscar Wilde Memorial Bookstore – at the time New York City's only gay bookstore – and Kramer was banned from the grocery store near his home on Fire Island. Reviewers found it difficult to believe that Kramer's accounts of gay relationships were accurate; both the gay and mainstream press panned the book. On the reception of the novel Kramer said: "The straight world thought I was repulsive, and the gay world treated me like a traitor. People would literally turn their back when I walked by. You know what my real crime was? I put the truth in writing. That's what I do: I have told the fucking truth to everyone I have ever met." Faggots, however, became one of the best-selling gay novels of all time.

In 2000, Reynolds Price wrote that the novel's lasting relevance is that "anyone who searches out present-day responses on the Internet will quickly find that the wounds inflicted by Faggots are burning still". Although the novel was rejected by the people from whom Kramer expected praise, the book has never been out of publication and is often taught in gay studies classes. "Faggots struck a chord," wrote Andrew Sullivan, "It exuded a sense that gay men could do better if they understood themselves as fully human, if they could shed their self-loathing and self-deception...."

=== Gay Men's Health Crisis ===
While living on Fire Island in the 1970s, Kramer had no intention of getting involved in political activism. There were politically active groups in New York City, but Kramer noted the culture on Fire Island was so different that they would often make fun of political activists: "It was not chic. It was not something you could brag about with your friends ... Guys marching down Fifth Avenue was a whole other world. The whole gestalt of Fire Island was about beauty and looks and golden men."

However, when friends he knew from Fire Island began getting sick in 1980, Kramer became involved in gay activism. In August 1981, although he had not been involved previously with gay activism, Kramer invited the "A-list" (his own term) group of gay men from the New York City area to his apartment to listen to a doctor say their friends' illnesses were related, and research needed to be done. The next year, they named themselves the Gay Men's Health Crisis (GMHC) and became the primary organization to raise funds for and provide services to people stricken with Acquired Immune Deficiency Syndrome (AIDS) in the New York area. Although Kramer served on its first board of directors, his view of how it should be run sharply conflicted with that of the rest of its members. While GMHC began to concentrate on social services for men who were dying, Kramer loudly insisted they fight for funding from New York City. Mayor Ed Koch became a particular target for Kramer, as did the behavior of gay men, before the nature of how the Human Immunodeficiency Virus (HIV) was transmitted was understood.

When doctors suggested men stop having sex, Kramer strongly encouraged GMHC to deliver the message to as many gay men as possible. When they refused, Kramer wrote an essay entitled "1,112 and Counting", which appeared in 1983 in the New York Native, a gay newspaper. The essay discussed the spread of the disease, the lack of government response, and the apathy of the gay community. The essay was intended to frighten gay men and provoke them to protest government indifference. Michael Specter wrote in The New Yorker, "it was a five-thousand-word screed that accused nearly everyone connected with health care in America – officials at the Centers for Disease Control, in Atlanta, researchers at the National Institutes of Health, in Washington D.C., doctors at Memorial Sloan-Kettering Cancer Center, in Manhattan, and local politicians (particularly Mayor Ed Koch) – of refusing to acknowledge the implications of the nascent AIDS epidemic. The article's harshest condemnation was directed at those gay men who seemed to think that if they ignored the new disease, it would simply go away. Tony Kushner, who won the 1993 Pulitzer Prize for Drama for his play Angels in America about the impact of AIDS in the United States, described the essay as "With that one piece, Larry changed my world. He changed the world for all of us."

Kramer's confrontational style proved to be an advantage, as it earned the issue of AIDS the attention of the New York media that no other individual could get. He found it a disadvantage when he realized his own reputation was "completely that of a crazy man". Kramer was particularly frustrated by bureaucratic stalling that snowballed in cases where gay but closeted men were the ones in charge of agencies that seemed to ignore AIDS. He confronted the director of a National Institutes of Health agency about not devoting more time and effort toward researching AIDS because he was closeted. He threw a drink in the face of Republican fundraiser Terry Dolan during a party and screamed at him for having affairs with men but using the fear of homosexuality to raise money for conservative causes. He called Ed Koch and the media and government agencies in New York City "equal to murderers". Even Kramer's personal life was affected when he and his lover – also a GMHC board member – split over Kramer's condemnations of the political apathy of GMHC.

Kramer's past also compromised his message, as many men who had been turned off by Faggots saw Kramer's warnings as alarmist, displaying negative attitudes toward sex. Playwright Robert Chesley responded to Kramer's New York Native article, saying, "Read anything by Kramer closely, and I think you'll find the subtext is always: the wages of gay sin are death". The GMHC ousted Kramer from the organization in 1983. Kramer's preferred method of communication was deemed too militant for the group.

In 1990, Kramer appeared in Rosa von Praunheim 's award-winning film Positive about the fight of activists in New York City for AIDS-education and the rights of HIV infected people.

=== The Normal Heart ===
Astonished and saddened about being forced out of GMHC, Kramer took an extended trip to Europe. While visiting the Dachau concentration camp he learned that it had opened as early as 1933 and neither Germans nor other nations did anything to stop it. He became inspired to chronicle the same reaction from the American government and the gay community to the AIDS crisis by writing The Normal Heart, despite having promised never to write for the theater again.

The Normal Heart is a play set between 1981 and 1984. It addresses a writer named Ned Weeks as he nurses his lover, who is dying of an unnamed disease. His doctors are puzzled and frustrated by having no resources to research it. Meanwhile, the unnamed organization Weeks is involved in is angered by the bad publicity Weeks' activism is generating, and eventually throws him out. Kramer later explained, "I tried to make Ned Weeks as obnoxious as I could ... I was trying, somehow and again, to atone for my own behavior." The experience was overwhelmingly emotional for Kramer, as at one time during rehearsals he watched actor Brad Davis hold his dying lover played by D. W. Moffett on stage; Kramer went into the bathroom and sobbed, only moments later to find Davis holding him. The play is considered a literary landmark. It contended with the AIDS crisis when few would speak of the disease afflicting gay men, including gays themselves; it remains the longest-running play ever staged at the Public Theater, running for a year starting in 1985. It has been produced over 600 times in the U.S., Europe (where it was televised in Poland), Israel, and South Africa. The Polish television adaptation débuted on the TVP channel on May 4, 1989, one month before the first free election in the country since 1928.

Actors following Davis who have portrayed Kramer's alter ego Ned Weeks include; Joel Grey, Richard Dreyfuss (in Los Angeles), Martin Sheen (at the Royal Court in London), Tom Hulce and then John Shea in the West End, Raul Esparza in a highly acclaimed 2004 revival at the Public Theater, and most recently Joe Mantello on Broadway at the Golden Theater. Upon seeing the production of The Normal Heart, Naomi Wolf commented, "No one else on the left at that time ... ever used the moral framework that is so much a part of Kramer's voice, and that the right has coopted so skillfully. Conscience, responsibility, calling; truth and lies, clarity of purpose or abandonment of one's moral calling; loyalty and betrayal ..."

In a review for The New York Times, Frank Rich said:

He accuses the governmental, medical and press establishments of foot-dragging in combating the disease—especially in the early days of its outbreak, when much of the play is set—and he is even tougher on homosexual leaders who, in his view, were either too cowardly or too mesmerized by the ideology of sexual liberation to get the story out. "There's not a good word to be said about anyone's behavior in this whole mess", claims one character—and certainly Mr. Kramer has few good words to say about Mayor Koch, various prominent medical organizations, The New York Times or, for that matter, most of the leadership of an unnamed organization apparently patterned after the Gay Men's Health Crisis.

In 2014, HBO produced a film version directed by Ryan Murphy with a screenplay by Kramer. It starred Mark Ruffalo, Matt Bomer (who won a Golden Globe Award for his performance), Taylor Kitsch, Jim Parsons, Alfred Molina, Julia Roberts, Joe Mantello, Jonathan Groff, and BD Wong.

=== ACT UP ===
In 1987, Kramer was the catalyst in the founding of the AIDS Coalition to Unleash Power (ACT UP), a direct action protest organization that chose government agencies and corporations as targets to publicize lack of treatment and funding for people with AIDS. ACT UP was formed at the Lesbian, Gay, Bisexual and Transgender Community Services Center in New York City. Kramer was asked to speak as part of a rotating speaker series, and his well-attended speech focused on action to fight AIDS. He began by having two-thirds of the room stand up, and told them they would be dead in five years. Kramer reiterated the points introduced in his essay "1,112 and Counting": "If my speech tonight doesn't scare the shit out of you, we're in real trouble. If what you're hearing doesn't rouse you to anger, fury, rage, and action, gay men will have no future here on earth. How long does it take before you get angry and fight back?" Their first target became the Food and Drug Administration (FDA), which Kramer accused of neglecting badly needed medication for HIV-infected Americans.

Engaging in civil disobedience that would result in many people being arrested was a primary objective, as it would focus attention on the target. On March 24, 1987, 17 people out of 250 participating were arrested for blocking rush-hour traffic in front of the FDA's Wall Street offices. Kramer was arrested dozens of times working with ACT UP, and the organization grew to hundreds of chapters in the U.S. and Europe. Immunologist Anthony Fauci stated, "In American medicine there are two eras. Before Larry and after Larry." Playwright Tony Kushner offered his opinion of why Kramer fought so relentlessly: "In a way, like a lot of Jewish men of Larry's generation, the Holocaust is a defining historical moment, and what happened in the early 1980s with AIDS felt, and was in fact, holocaustal to Larry."

Two decades later Kramer continued to advocate for social and legal equity for homosexuals. "Our own country's democratic process declares us to be unequal, which means, in a democracy, that our enemy is you," he wrote in 2007. "You treat us like crumbs. You hate us. And sadly, we let you."

In later decades, Kramer also continued to argue for funding research into cures for AIDS, contending that existing treatments disincentivized the pharmaceutical industry from developing cures. This distrust of the industry was demonstrated in Kramer's final public statement about curing AIDS, via a question posed to Joe Biden at a town hall during the 2020 presidential campaign, in which he accused pharmaceutical companies of "profit[ing] irrationally from HIV-positive Americans who depend on the medications forever," and asking "as president, how would you finance a CURE and scale back the avarice of pharmaceutical companies."

=== Just Say No, A Play about a Farce ===
Continuing his commentary on government indifference toward AIDS, Kramer wrote Just Say No, A Play about a Farce in 1988. In the dramatic work he highlighted the sexual hypocrisy in the Reagan and Koch administrations that allowed AIDS to become an epidemic; it concerns a First Lady, her gay son, and the closeted gay mayor of America's "largest northeastern city". Its New York production, starring Kathleen Chalfant, Tonya Pinkens, and David Margulies, was prized by the few who came to see it after its negative review by The New York Times. Social critic and writer Susan Sontag wrote of the piece, "Larry Kramer is one of America's most valuable troublemakers. I hope he never lowers his voice."

=== Reports from the Holocaust: The Making of an AIDS Activist ===
First published in 1989, and later expanded and republished in 1994, Reports from the Holocaust: The Making of an AIDS Activist contains a diverse selection of the non-fiction writings of Larry Kramer focused on AIDS activism and LGBTQ civil rights, including letters to the editor and speeches, which document his time spent at Gay Men's Health Crisis, ACT UP, and beyond, with the updated edition being organised chronologically from 1978 to 1993.

The central message of the book is that gay men must accept responsibility for their lives, and that those who are still living must give back to their community by fighting for People With AIDS and LGBTQ rights, for, as Kramer states, "I must put back something into this world for my own life, which is worth a tremendous amount. By not putting back, you are saying that your lives are worth shit, and that we deserve to die, and that the deaths of all our friends and lovers have amounted to nothing. I can't believe that in your heart of hearts you feel this way. I can't believe you want to die. Do you?" The first publication provides a portrait of Kramer as activist, and the 1994 edition contains commentary written by him that reflects on his earlier pieces and provides insight into Larry Kramer as writer.

Kramer directly and deliberately defines AIDS as a holocaust because he believes the United States' government failed to respond quickly and expend the necessary resources to cure AIDS, largely because AIDS initially infected gay men, and, quite soon after, predominantly poor and politically powerless minorities. In Report from the Holocaust, he wrote: "One inadvertent fall-out from the Holocaust is the growing inability to view any other similar tragedies as awful". Through speeches, editorials, and personal, sometimes publicized, letters to figures such as politician Gary Bauer, former New York Mayor Ed Koch, several New York Times reporters, and head of the National Institute of Allergy and Infectious Diseases, Anthony Fauci, Kramer personally advocates for a more significant response to AIDS. He implores the government to conduct research based on commonly accepted scientific standards and to allocate funds and personnel to AIDS research. Kramer ultimately states that the response to AIDS in America must be defined as a holocaust because of the large number deaths that resulted from the negligence and apathy that surrounded AIDS in the Ronald Reagan, George H. W. Bush, and early Bill Clinton presidencies.

=== The Destiny of Me ===
The Destiny of Me picks up where The Normal Heart left off, following Ned Weeks as he continues his journey fighting those whose complacency or will impede the discovery of a cure for a disease from which he suffers. The play opened in October 1992 and ran for one year off Broadway at the Lucille Lortel Theatre by the Circle Repertory Company. It was a finalist for the Pulitzer Prize, was a double Obie Award winner and received the Lortel Award for Outstanding Play of the Year. The original production starred John Cameron Mitchell, "a young actor who dominates the show with a performance at once ethereal and magnetic", according to The New York Times reviewer Frank Rich. Most powerful, Rich wrote, was the thematic question Kramer posed to himself: "Why was he of all people destined to scream bloody murder with the aim of altering the destiny of the human race?" Kramer states in his introduction to the play:

This journey, from discovery through guilt to momentary joy and toward AIDS, has been my longest, most important journey, as important as—no, more important than my life with my parents, than my life as a writer, than my life as an activist. Indeed, my homosexuality, as unsatisfying as much of it was for so long, has been the single most important defining characteristic of my life.

Its 2002 London Finborough Theatre production was the No. 1 Critics Choice in The Evening Standard.

=== The Tragedy of Today's Gays ===
Tragedy was a speech and a call to arms that Kramer delivered five days after the 2004 re-election of George W. Bush and later published as a book. Kramer believed that Bush was re-elected largely because of his opposition to same-sex marriage, and found it inconceivable that voters would respond so strongly to that issue when there were so many more pressing ones:

Almost 60 million people whom we live and work with every day think we are immoral. "Moral values" was top of many lists of why people supported George Bush. Not Iraq. Not the economy. Not terrorism. "Moral values". In case you need a translation that means us. It is hard to stand up to so much hate.

The speech's effects were far-reaching and had most corners of the gay world once again discussing Kramer's moral vision of drive and self-worth for the LGBTQ community.

Kramer even stated: "Does it occur to you that we brought this plague of AIDS upon ourselves? I know I am getting into dangerous waters here but it is time. With the cabal breathing even more murderously down our backs it is time. And you are still doing it. You are still murdering each other."

Kramer, again, had his detractors from the community. Writing for Salon.com, Richard Kim felt that once again Kramer personified the very object of his criticism: homophobia.

He recycles the kind of harangues about gay men (and young gay men in particular) that institutions like the Times so love to print – that they are buffoonish, disengaged Peter Pans dancing, drugging and fucking their lives away while the world and the disco burn down around them.

=== The American People: A History ===
Around 1981, Kramer began researching and writing a manuscript called The American People: A History, an ambitious historical work that begins in the Stone Age and continues into the present. For example, there is information relating to Kramer's assertion that Abraham Lincoln was gay. In 2002, Will Schwalbe, editor-in-chief of Hyperion Books – the only man to have read the entire manuscript to that date – said, "He has set himself the hugest of tasks," and he described it as "staggering, brilliant, funny, and harrowing." In 2006, Kramer said of the work, "[It is] my own history of America and of the cause of HIV/AIDS ... Writing and researching this history has convinced me that the plague of HIV/AIDS has been intentionally allowed to happen."

The book was published as a novel by Farrar, Straus & Giroux in 2015. In The New York Times Book Review, Dwight Garner wrote, "I wish I could report that The American People, Volume 1 had power to match its scope. It does not. As a work of sustained passion, it is formidable. As a work of art, it is very modest indeed. The tone is talky and digressive; few real characters emerge; one feels lashed to the mast after only 50 pages or so." In the book, Kramer writes that in addition to Abraham Lincoln, George Washington, Benjamin Franklin, Alexander Hamilton, Andrew Jackson, Franklin Pierce, James Buchanan, Mark Twain, Herman Melville, and Richard Nixon were gay. The second volume, 880 pages, was published in 2020.

=== Larry Kramer Initiative for Lesbian and Gay Studies ===
In 1997, Kramer approached Yale University, to bequeath several million dollars "to endow a permanent, tenured professorship in gay studies and possibly to build a gay and lesbian student center." At that time, gender, ethnic and race-related studies were viewed warily by academia. The then Yale provost, Alison Richard, stated that gay and lesbian studies was too narrow a specialty for a program in perpetuity. Kramer's rejected proposal read: "Yale is to use this money solely for 1) the study of and/or instruction in gay male literature, by which I mean courses to study gay male writers throughout history or the teaching to gay male students of writing about their heritage and their experience. To ensure for the continuity of courses in either or both of these areas tenured positions should be established; and/or 2) the establishment of a gay student center at Yale."

In 2001, both sides settled upon establishing the Larry Kramer Initiative for Lesbian and Gay Studies, which would include visiting professors and a program of conferences, guest speakers and other events. Arthur Kramer endowed the program at Yale with $1 million to support a five-year trial. Kramer agreed to leave his literary papers and those chronicling the AIDS movement and his founding of GMHC and ACT UP to Yale's Beinecke Library. "A lot has changed since I made my initial demands," said Kramer. "I was trying to cram stuff down their throat. I'd rather they fashion their own stuff. It may allow for a much more expandable notion of what lesbian and gay studies really is." The five-year program ended in 2006.

=== An Army of Lovers Must Not Die ===
In 2020, in response to the COVID-19 pandemic, Kramer began to write a play titled An Army of Lovers Must Not Die.

== Personal life ==
=== Relationship with his brother ===
Larry and Arthur Kramer were eight years apart. Arthur was the founding partner of the law firm Kramer Levin. Their relationship was portrayed in Kramer's The Normal Heart (1984). In the play, Kramer portrays Arthur (as Ben Weeks) as more concerned with building his $2 million house in Connecticut than helping his brother's cause. Humorist Calvin Trillin, a friend of both Larry and Arthur, once called The Normal Heart "the play about the building of [Arthur's] house". Anemona Hartocollis observed in The New York Times that "their story came to define an era for hundreds of thousands of theatergoers". Arthur, who had protected his younger brother from the parents they both disliked, could neither reject Larry, nor accept his homosexuality. This caused years of arguing and stretches of silence between them. In the 1980s, Arthur refused Larry's request for Kramer Levin to represent the fledgling Gay Men's Health Crisis, blaming the need to clear it with his firm's intake committee. When Larry called for a boycott of MCI, a prominent Kramer Levin client, Arthur took it as a personal affront. In 1992, after Colorado voters endorsed Amendment 2, an anti-gay rights referendum, Larry supported a boycott of the state, while Arthur refused to cancel a ski trip to Aspen.

Throughout their disagreements, the two remained close. In The Normal Heart, Larry wrote: "The brothers love each other a great deal; [Arthur's] approval is essential to [Larry]."

In 2001, Arthur endowed a $1 million grant for Yale University to establish the Larry Kramer Initiative for Lesbian and Gay Studies, a program focusing on gay history.

Kramer Levin LLP would later become a staunch advocate for the gay rights movement, assisting the Lambda Legal Defense and Education Fund on high-profile cases as Lawrence v. Texas before the U.S. Supreme Court and Hernandez v. Robles before the New York Court of Appeals. Arthur Kramer retired from the firm in 1996 and died from a stroke in 2008.

=== Health ===
In 1988, stress over the closing of his play Just Say No, only a few weeks after its opening, forced Kramer into the hospital after it aggravated a congenital hernia. While in surgery, doctors discovered liver damage due to hepatitis B, prompting Kramer to learn that he was HIV positive.

In 2001, at the age of 66, Kramer was in dire need of a liver transplant, but he was turned down by Mount Sinai Hospital's organ transplant list. People living with HIV were routinely considered inappropriate candidates for organ transplants because of complications from HIV and perceived short lifespans. Out of the 4,954 liver transplants performed in the United States, only 11 were for HIV-positive people. The news prompted Newsweek to announce Kramer was dying in June 2001; the Associated Press in December of the same year mistakenly reported Kramer's death. Kramer became a symbol for infected people who had new leases on life due to advances in medicine. "We shouldn't face a death sentence because of who we are or who we love", he said in an interview. In May 2001, the Thomas E. Starzl Transplantation Institute at the University of Pittsburgh, which had performed more transplants for HIV positive patients than any other facility in the world, accepted Kramer as a potential transplant recipient. Kramer received a new liver on December 21, 2001. In April 2019 he suffered a broken leg.

=== Relationships ===
Kramer and his partner, architectural designer David Webster, were together from 1991 until Kramer's death. Webster's ending of his relationship with Kramer in the 1970s had inspired Kramer to write Faggots (1978). When asked about their reunion decades later, Webster replied: "He'd grown up, I'd grown up." On July 24, 2013, Kramer and Webster married in the intensive care unit of NYU Langone Medical Center in New York City while Kramer recovered from surgery.

=== Residence ===
Kramer divided his time between a residence in Manhattan, near Washington Square Park in Greenwich Village, and Connecticut. Another resident of Kramer's Manhattan residential complex was Kramer's longtime nemesis, Ed Koch, who had been mayor of New York City from 1978 to 1989. The two saw each other relatively infrequently, since they lived in different towers. When Kramer saw Koch looking at the apartment in 1989, Kramer reportedly told him, "Don't move in here! There are people here who hate you!" On another occasion, Koch tried to pet Kramer's Wheaten Terrier dog, Molly, in the building's mail area, and Kramer snatched the dog away.

=== Death ===
Kramer died of pneumonia on May 27, 2020, at age 84, less than a month short of his 85th birthday.

== Bibliography and works ==
=== Drama ===
- Sissies' Scrapbook, aka Four Friends (1973)
- A Minor Dark Age (1973)
- The Normal Heart (1985)
- Just Say No, A Play about a Farce (1988)
- The Furniture of Home (1989)
- The Destiny of Me (1992)

=== Fiction ===
- Faggots (1978)
- The American People Volume 1, Search for My Heart (2015)
- The American People: Volume 2, The Brutality of Fact (2020)

=== Nonfiction ===
- Reports from the Holocaust: The Making of an AIDS Activist (1989, revised 1994)
- The Tragedy of Today's Gays (2005)
- Act Up! (2012) key figure in documentary, by director Scott Robbe

=== Screenplays ===
- Here We Go Round the Mulberry Bush (1967) - Writer (additional dialogue)
- Women in Love (1969) – Writer/producer
- Lost Horizon (1973) – Writer
- The Normal Heart (2014) – Writer

=== Speeches ===
- The Tragedy of Today's Gays, November 10, 2004.
- We are not crumbs, we must not accept crumbs, remarks on the occasion of the 20th Anniversary of ACT UP, NY Lesbian and Gay Community Center, March 13, 2007.

=== Articles ===
- "1,112 and Counting", New York Native, March 1983
- "Be Very Afraid", POZ, October 2000

== Awards and recognition ==
- 1970: Nominated for the Academy Award for Writing Adapted Screenplay for Women in Love for his screenplay adaptation of the novel by D. H. Lawrence
- 1993: Pulitzer Prize finalist for The Destiny of Me
- 1993: Winner of two Obie Awards for The Destiny of Me
- 1996: American Academy of Arts and Letters, Award in Literature
- 1996: Public Service Award from Common Cause
- 1999: The Normal Heart named as one of the Hundred Best Plays of the 20th Century by the National Theatre of Great Britain
- 2005: Elected to the American Philosophical Society
- 2006: Named by Equality Forum as one of their 31 Icons of the LGBT History Month.
- 2011: The Normal Heart won the Tony Award for Best Revival of a Play
- 2012: Montgomery Fellowship at Dartmouth College
- 2013: PEN/Laura Pels International Foundation for Theater Award for a Master American Dramatist
- 2014: Primetime Emmy Award for Outstanding Writing for a Miniseries, Movie or a Dramatic Special for the HBO movie adaptation of The Normal Heart
- 2015: Inaugural Larry Kramer Activism Award from Gay Men's Health Crisis
- 2020: In June 2020, Kramer was added among American "pioneers, trailblazers, and heroes" on the National LGBTQ Wall of Honor within the Stonewall National Monument (SNM) in New York City's Stonewall Inn. The SNM is the first U.S. national monument dedicated to LGBTQ rights and history.

== See also ==
- LGBT culture in New York City
- List of LGBT people from New York City
- Paul Monette: The Brink of Summer's End

== In the media ==
- Kramer's early activism is featured in the second episode of the fifth season of the podcast Fiasco, hosted by Leon Neyfakh.
