= The Normal Heart =

1985 play by Larry Kramer

- Cover of the paperback edition released by Plume in October 1985
- Original language: English
- Written by: Larry Kramer
- Subject: AIDS in New York City
- Genre: Drama
- Setting: New York City, New York, United States

Premiere
- Date: April 21, 1985; April 19, 2011 (revival)
- Place: The Public Theater; New York City, New York, United States

The Normal Heart is a largely autobiographical play by Larry Kramer. It focuses on the rise of the HIV/AIDS epidemic in New York City between 1981 and 1984, as seen through the eyes of writer/activist Ned Weeks, the gay founder of a prominent HIV advocacy group. The play's title comes from W. H. Auden's poem, "September 1, 1939".

After a successful 1985 off-Broadway production at The Public Theater, the play was staged in Los Angeles and London. It was revived off-Broadway in 2004, and finally made its Broadway debut in 2011. The play was first published by Plume in the US, and by Drama Editor Nick Hern for Methuen in the UK to coincide with the 1986 British première at London's Royal Court Theatre. He then reissued it in his own imprint Nick Hern Books in 2011 when first staged on Broadway, and again in a tie-in edition alongside the National Theatre revival in 2021.

== Characters ==
- Craig Donner
- Mickey Marcus
- Ned Weeks
- Dr. Emma Brookner
- Bruce Niles
- Felix Turner
- Ben Weeks
- Tommy Boatwright
- Hiram Keebler

== Synopsis ==
During the early 1980s, Jewish-American writer and gay activist Ned Weeks struggles to pull together an organization focused on raising awareness about the fact that an unidentified disease is killing off a specific group of people: gay men, largely in New York City. Dr. Emma Brookner, a physician and survivor of polio (as a consequence of which she is using a wheelchair), has the most experience with this strange new disease. She bemoans the lack of medical knowledge about the illness, and encourages gay men to practice abstinence for their own safety, since it is still unknown how the disease is spread. Ned, a patient and friend of Brookner's, calls upon his lawyer brother, Ben, to help fund his crisis organization; however, Ben's attitude toward his brother is one of merely passive support, which ultimately exposes his homophobia. For the first time in his life, meanwhile, Ned falls in love, beginning a relationship with New York Times writer Felix Turner.

The increasing death toll raises the unknown illness, by this time correctly believed to be caused by a virus, to the status of an epidemic, though the press remains largely silent on the issue. A sense of urgency guides Ned, who realizes that Ben is more interested in buying a two-million-dollar house than in backing Ned's activism. Ned explosively breaks off ties with his brother, not wanting further interaction until Ben can fully accept Ned's homosexuality. Ned next looks to Mayor Ed Koch's administration for help in financing research about the epidemic, which has now killed hundreds of gay men, including some of Ned's personal friends.

Ned's organization elects as its president Bruce Niles, who is described as the "good cop" of gay activism in implicit comparison to Ned: while Bruce is cautious, polite, deferential, and closeted, Ned is vociferous, confrontational, incendiary, openly gay, and supportive only of direct action. Tensions between the two are clear, though they must work together to effectively promote their organization. Felix, meanwhile, reveals to Ned his belief that he is now infected with the mysterious virus.

Although he continues to try to strengthen interactions with the mayor, Ned ruins his chances when his relentless and fiery personality appalls a representative sent by the mayor. Dr. Brookner gradually takes on the role of activist herself, and notes the epidemic's appearance in other countries and among heterosexuals. Although she desperately seeks government funding for further research, her request is denied; the rejection prompts her to unleash a passionate tirade against those who allow the persistence of an epidemic that is taking the lives of homosexuals, who are already marginalized by the government. In the meantime, Ned's conflict with Bruce comes to a head, and their organization's board of directors ultimately expels Ned from the group, believing his unstable vehemence to be a threat to the group's attempts to engage in calmer diplomacy.

As Felix's condition worsens, he visits Ben in order to make his will, and in the hope of effecting a reconciliation between Ben and his brother. All of them, along with Emma, meet at Felix's deathbed. Emma unofficially weds Felix and Ned, and Felix dies immediately after. Ned blames himself for his lover's death, lamenting that he did not fight hard enough to make his voice heard. The play ends with Ned and Ben embracing. As the stage fades to black, the rate of mortality from HIV/AIDS is shown to be continuing to increase.

== Autobiographical parallels ==
After most performances of the 2011 revival of The Normal Heart, Kramer personally passed out a dramaturgical flyer detailing some of the real stories behind the play's characters. Kramer wrote that the character "Bruce" was based on Paul Popham, the president of the GMHC from 1981 until 1985; "Tommy" was based on Rodger McFarlane, who was executive director of GMHC and a founding member of ACT UP and Broadway Cares; and "Emma" was modeled after Dr. Linda Laubenstein, who treated some of the first New York cases of what later became known as AIDS. Like "Ned," Kramer himself helped to found several AIDS-activism groups, including Gay Men's Health Crisis (GMHC) and AIDS Coalition to Unleash Power (ACT UP), and indeed experienced personal conflict with his lawyer brother, Arthur.

It has been suggested (though not by Kramer himself) that the model for 'Felix' was John Duka, a New York Times style reporter who died of AIDS-related complications in 1989.

== Productions ==
=== 1985–1999 ===
Produced by Joseph Papp and directed by Michael Lindsay-Hogg, the play opened off-Broadway at The Public Theater on April 21, 1985, and ran for 294 performances. The original cast included Brad Davis as Ned and D. W. Moffett as Felix, with David Allen Brooks as Bruce Niles and Concetta Tomei as Dr. Emma Brookner (based on Linda Laubenstein, M.D.). Joel Grey replaced Davis later in the run.

During the original 1985 production, the set was very simple with a small amount of furniture and the set walls consisted of white-washed plywood. All along these walls and even the theatre walls, there were facts, newspaper headlines, figures and names that were involved in the HIV/AIDS Epidemic painted in black. For example, one of the passages written on the set read, "During the first nineteen months of the epidemic, The New York Times wrote about it a total of seven times" and another passage read, "During the three months of the Tylenol scare in 1982, The New York Times wrote about it a total of 54 times". The text that was painted onto the set was updated and revised constantly. One fact stated the latest number of AIDS cases nationally (according to the Centers for Disease Control), and if the number increased, before the next performance the set designers would cross out the old number and, below it, paint the new figure.

The play received its European premiere in 1986 at London's Royal Court Theatre, where it was directed by David Hayman and produced by Bruce Hyman. In that production Ned Weeks was initially played by Martin Sheen who received an Olivier Award nomination as Best Actor. When it transferred to the Albery Theatre (now the Noël Coward Theatre) Ned Weeks was played by Tom Hulce and then John Shea. For that production Paul Jesson, who played Felix, won the Laurence Olivier Award for Best Performance in a Supporting Role.

The Normal Heart received its Polish premiere in 1987 at the Polish Theatre in Poznań where it was directed by Grzegorz Mrówczyński. The Polish cast included Mariusz Puchalski as Ned Weeks and Mariusz Sabiniewicz as Tommy Boatwright, with Andrzej Szczytko as Bruce Niles and Irena Grzonka as Dr. Emma Brookner.

In a student production of the play at Cambridge University in 1988, the role of Felix was played by Nick Clegg.

The play received its Australian premiere at the Sydney Theatre Company in 1989, directed by Wayne Harrison.

In subsequent productions of the play, Ned Weeks was portrayed by Richard Dreyfuss in Los Angeles, and Raul Esparza in a 2004 Off-Broadway revival directed by David Esbjornson at the Public.

On April 18, 1993, Barbra Streisand organized and introduced a benefit reading for Broadway Cares at the Roundabout Theatre Company (for years she had been trying to get the movie made with her as director). It starred Kevin Bacon, John Turturro, Harry Hamlin, D.W. Moffett, Tony Roberts, David Drake, Kevin Geer, Jonathan Hadary, Eric Bogosian as Ned Weeks and Stockard Channing as Emma Brookner.

=== 2000s ===
The show had an Off-Broadway revival in 2004 at the Public Theater presented by the Worth Street Theater Company, starring Raúl Esparza as Ned Weeks and Joanna Gleason and Lisa Kron as Dr. Brookner, directed by David Esbjornson (taking over from Jeff Cohen mid-rehearsal) and lighting design by Ken Billington. The success of this revival lead to the 2011 Broadway production.

The Broadway premiere of The Normal Heart began on April 19, 2011, for a limited 12-week engagement at the Golden Theatre. This production used elements employed in a staged reading, directed by Joel Grey, held in October 2010. The cast featured Joe Mantello as Ned, Ellen Barkin (making her Broadway debut) as Dr. Brookner, John Benjamin Hickey as Felix, Lee Pace as Bruce Niles, and Jim Parsons as Tommy Boatwright (both Pace and Parsons made their Broadway debuts). Joel Grey made his Broadway directing debut; George C. Wolfe was supervising director. The production supported several "nonprofit organizations, including The Actors Fund and Friends In Deed."

In the 2011 Broadway revival, when the actors weren't in the scene they would stand along the walls of the set and watch from the shadows the scene being performed. Towards the end of the play when Felix dies, he leaves Ned alone on center stage and steps back to where the other actors are, along the shadowy walls of the set. This Broadway production also echoed the original idea to have the white-washed walls covered with facts and figures. During the finale of this production, names of those affected by the AIDS Epidemic were gradually projected onto the walls until the set was completely covered in names, marking the end of the play.

A production at Washington, D.C.'s, Arena Stage was scheduled to run from June 8 to July 29, 2012.

A production produced by Studio 180 Theatre at Buddies in Bad Times theatre in Toronto, Ontario, in 2011 and 2012 starred Jonathan Wilson as Ned Weeks and John Bourgeois as Ben.

In May 2021, the One Institute presented a historic virtual reading of "The Normal Heart" reaching audiences across the United States and in 19 countries across the globe. The virtual presentation marked the first time the play featured a cast that is predominately BIPOC and LGBTQ. Directed by Emmy Award winner Paris Barclay, cast members of the production included Sterling K. Brown, Laverne Cox, Jeremy Pope, Vincent Rodriguez III, Guillermo Díaz, Jake Borelli, Ryan O’Connell, Daniel Newman, Jay Hayden and Danielle Savre. An encore presentation of the reading streamed worldwide in December 2021 in honor of World AIDS Day.

A London revival of the play was originally scheduled to begin performances at the National Theatre in Spring 2021, but was delayed due to the COVID-19 pandemic. It began previews on 23 September 2021 at the National's Olivier Theatre, with a Dominic Cooke-directed cast led by Ben Daniels, Liz Carr and Luke Norris. The production, staged in part celebration of the play's 35th anniversary and the author (who died of pneumonia in 2020), received largely positive reviews. Many critics noted social and political parallels between the play's representation of the HIV/AIDS epidemic and the COVID-19 pandemic. The revival ran until 6 November 2021, and received five Laurence Olivier Award nominations the following year, including Best Revival and Best Actor for Daniels. Carr won the Olivier for Best Actress in a Supporting Role, and Daniels received a Critics' Circle Theatre Award for Best Actor.

The State Theatre Company of South Australia staged the play at the Adelaide Festival Centre in October 2022, directed by Dean Bryant, with STCSA artistic director Mitchell Butel as Ned and Mark Saturno as Ben.

== Television adaptations ==
A Polish television adaptation débuted on the TVP channel on 4 May 1989, one month before the first free election in the country since 1928.

The American telefilm adaptation débuted on the HBO premium pay cable channel on Sunday, May 25, 2014.

== Sequel ==
Kramer wrote a sequel about Ned Weeks in 1992, The Destiny of Me, which was performed at the Lucille Lortel Theater by the Circle Repertory Company in October of that year.

== Critical reception and response ==
In his review in The New York Times, Frank Rich observed, "In this fiercely polemical drama ... the playwright starts off angry, soon gets furious and then skyrockets into sheer rage. Although Mr. Kramer's theatrical talents are not always as highly developed as his conscience, there can be little doubt that The Normal Heart is the most outspoken play around – or that it speaks up about a subject that justifies its author's unflagging, at times even hysterical, sense of urgency. ... Mr. Kramer has few good words to say about Mayor Koch, various prominent medical organizations, The New York Times or, for that matter, most of the leadership of an unnamed organization apparently patterned after the Gay Men's Health Crisis. Some of the author's specific accusations are questionable, and, needless to say, we often hear only one side of inflammatory debates. But there are also occasions when the stage seethes with the conflict of impassioned, literally life-and-death argument. ... The writing's pamphleteering tone is accentuated by Mr. Kramer's insistence on repetition - nearly every scene seems to end twice - and on regurgitating facts and figures in lengthy tirades. Some of the supporting players ... are too flatly written to emerge as more than thematic or narrative pawns. The characters often speak in the same bland journalistic voice - so much so that lines could be reassigned from one to another without the audience detecting the difference. If these drawbacks ... blunt the play's effectiveness, there are still many powerful vignettes sprinkled throughout."

Jack Kroll of Newsweek called it "extraordinary" and added, "It is bracing and exciting to hear so much passion and intelligence. Kramer produces a cross fire of life-and-death energies that create a fierce and moving human drama." In the New York Daily News, Liz Smith said, "An astounding drama . . . a damning indictment of a nation in the middle of an epidemic with its head in the sand. It will make your hair stand on end even as the tears spurt from your eyes." Rex Reed stated, "No one who cares about the future of the human race can afford to miss The Normal Heart," while director Harold Prince commented, "I haven't been this involved – upset – in too damn long. Kramer honors us with this stormy, articulate theatrical work."

On the day The Normal Heart opened, a spokesman for The New York Times addressed statements in the play about the newspaper's failure to give the disease adequate coverage. He said that as soon as The Times became aware of AIDS, it assigned a member of the science staff to cover the story, and his article appeared on July 3, 1981, making The Times "one of the first – if not the first – national news media to alert the public to the scientific recognition and spread of the disease." He also cited a later full-length report in The New York Times Magazine about recent discoveries made by researchers. When asked about his negative portrayal in The Normal Heart, former New York City Mayor Ed Koch said through a spokesman, "I haven't seen the play. But I hope it's as good as As Is, which is superb."

In 2000, the Royal National Theatre named The Normal Heart one of the 100 greatest plays of the 20th century. In his 2004 book, How to Do the History of Homosexuality, David Halperin criticized the character of Ned Weeks for surrendering to "gay chauvinism" and "homosexual essentialism" through "various strategies of elitism and exclusion" when he lists renowned homosexuals he considers part of his culture.

Of the 2011 Broadway revival of the play, Ben Brantley wrote in The New York Times:

What this interpretation makes clear, though, is that Mr. Kramer is truly a playwright as well as a pamphleteer (and, some might add, a self-promoter). Seen some 25 years on, The Normal Heart turns out to be about much more than the one-man stand of Ned Weeks, the writer who takes it upon himself to warn gay men about AIDS (before it was even identified as such) and alienates virtually everyone he comes across. Ned Weeks — need I say? — is Larry Kramer, with a thoroughness that few onstage alter-egos can claim.

After the 2011 Broadway production, Patrick Healy from The New York Times interviewed young, gay men that had attended the show to see their reaction to the subject matter. Most of the young men that Healy interviewed talked about how the HIV/AIDS epidemic is almost never brought up in textbooks or discussed in class by teachers. The Broadway revival became a "heart-tugging lesson", according to Healy's interviews, for those who weren't alive during the events that unfolded in the gay community in the 1980s.

On June 12, 2011, Ellen Barkin and John Benjamin Hickey won the Tony Awards for Best Performance by a Featured Actress and Actor, respectively, for its Broadway debut, while the production won Best Revival of a Play.

In his review of the 2021 historic reading of the play presented by the One Archives Foundation, Los Angeles Times chief theatre critic Charles McNulty praised cast member Sterling K. Brown noting that he "captured so brilliantly" the role of Ned Weeks. He added: "the choice of Brown was inspired. Not only is he an exceptional, Emmy-winning actor, but his performance represented an act of coalition building, a recognition of shared struggle and a refusal to let the walls of identity serve as a prison."

== Awards and nominations ==
=== Original London production ===
Year	Award	Category	Nominee	Result
1986	Laurence Olivier Award	Play of the Year		Nominated
1986	Laurence Olivier Award	Actor of the Year	Martin Sheen	Nominated
1986	Laurence Olivier Award	Outstanding Performance of the Year in a Supporting Role	Paul Jesson	Won

=== 2011 Broadway revival ===
Year	Award	Category	Nominee	Result
2011	Tony Award	Best Revival of a Play		Won
2011	Tony Award	Best Actor in a Play	Joe Mantello	Nominated
2011	Tony Award	Best Featured Actor in a Play	John Benjamin Hickey	Won
2011	Tony Award	Best Featured Actress in a Play	Ellen Barkin	Won
2011	Tony Award	Best Direction of a Play	George C. Wolfe and Joel Grey	Nominated
2011	Drama Desk Award	Outstanding Revival of a Play		Won
2011	Drama Desk Award	Outstanding Ensemble Performance		Honoree
2011	Drama Desk Award	Outstanding Director of a Play	George C. Wolfe and Joel Grey	Won

=== 2021 London revival ===
Year	Award	Category	Nominee	Result
2022	Laurence Olivier Award	Best Revival		Nominated
2022	Laurence Olivier Award	Best Actor	Ben Daniels	Nominated
2022	Laurence Olivier Award	Best Actor in a Supporting Role	Dino Fetscher	Nominated
2022	Laurence Olivier Award	Best Actor in a Supporting Role	Danny Lee Wynter	Nominated
2022	Laurence Olivier Award	Best Actress in a Supporting Role	Liz Carr	Won
2022	Critics' Circle Theatre Award	Best Actor	Ben Daniels	Won
