= Amanda Mackey =

American casting director (1951–2022)

- Born: September 22, 1951; New York City, U.S.
- Died: August 27, 2022 (aged 70); New York City, U.S.
- Occupation: Casting director

Amanda Mackey (September 22, 1951 – August 27, 2022) was an American casting director. She worked as a casting director on many films from the 1980s to the 2020s, including The Fugitive, Olympus Has Fallen, The Proposal, Rocky IV, The Hunt for Red October, Ronin, Holes, Star Trek IV: The Voyage Home, Star Trek: Nemesis, and Those Who Wish Me Dead. In 2014, she was nominated for a Primetime Emmy Award in the category Outstanding Casting for a Miniseries, Movie or a Special for the television film The Normal Heart. She shared the nomination with Cathy Sandrich Gelfond. Mackey died on August 27, 2022, in Brooklyn after battling myelodysplastic syndrome. She was 70.
