= Arthur Kramer =

American lawyer (1927–2008)

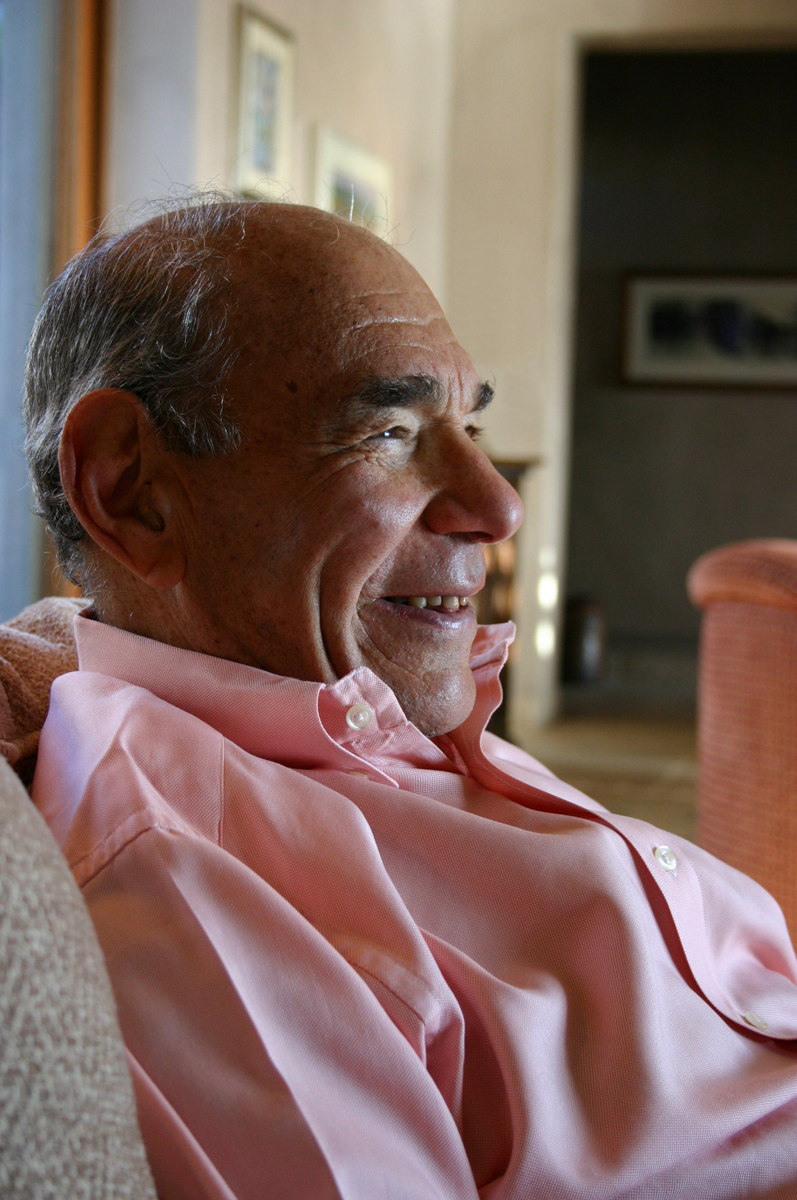

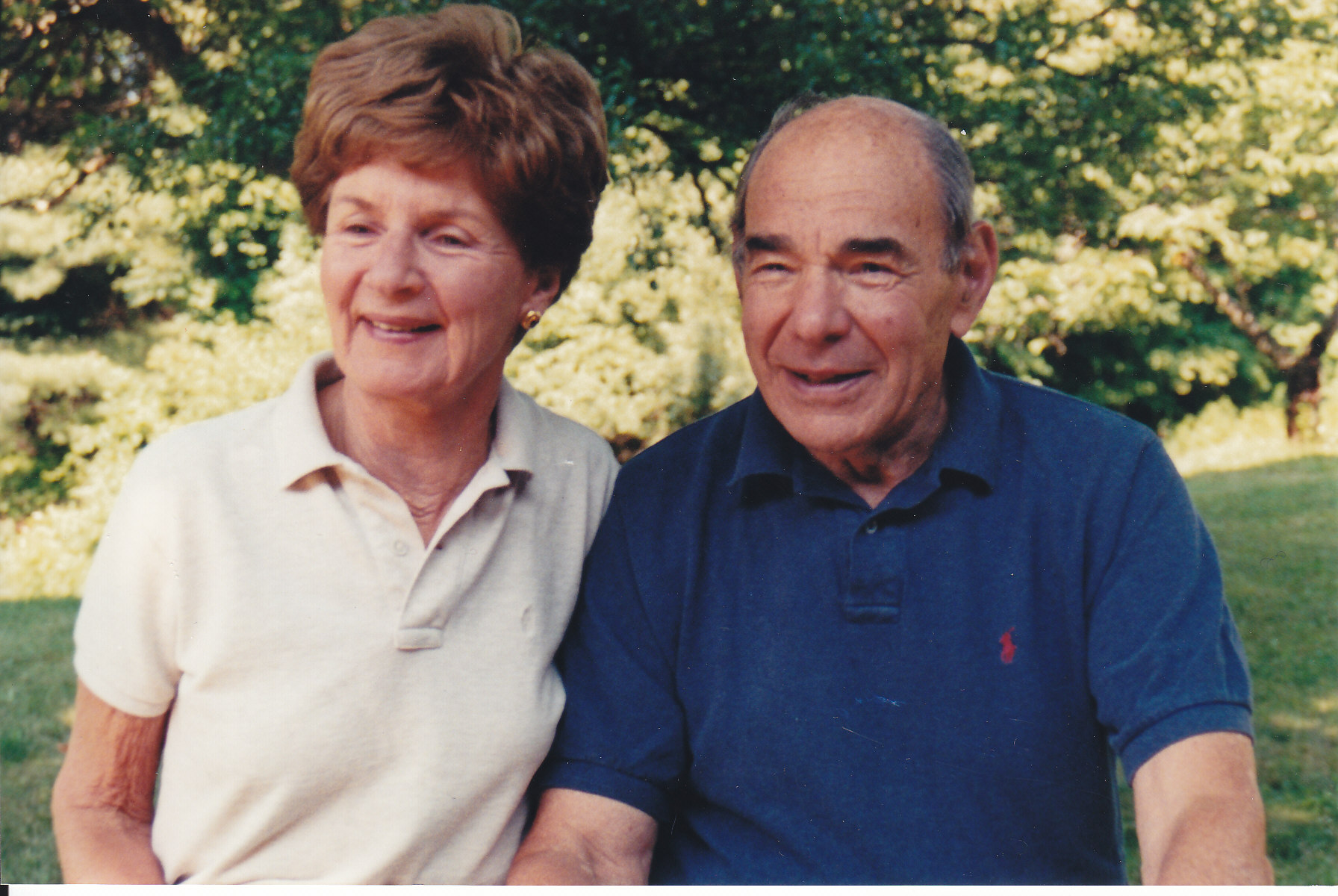
Alice and Arthur Kramer

Arthur Kramer (January 10, 1927 − January 26, 2008) was an American attorney who was the founding partner of law firm Kramer Levin.

== Family ==
Kramer's relationship with his brother, playwright Larry Kramer, moved into the public sphere with Larry's 1984 play, The Normal Heart. In the play, Larry portrays Arthur ("Ben Weeks") as more concerned with building his $2 million house in Connecticut than in helping his brother's cause. Humorist Calvin Trillin, a friend of both Larry and Arthur, once called The Normal Heart "the play about the building of [Arthur's] house." Anemona Hartocollis observed in The New York Times that "their story came to define an era for hundreds of thousands of theatergoers."

Arthur, who had been his younger brother's protector against the parents they both disliked, couldn't find it in his heart to reject Larry, but also couldn't accept his homosexuality. This caused years of arguing and stretches of silence between the siblings. In the 1980s, Larry wanted Arthur's firm to represent the fledgling Gay Men's Health Crisis, a nonprofit Larry organized. Arthur said he had to clear it with his firm's intake committee. Larry saw this as a cop-out — rightly, as Arthur said later. Larry called for a gay boycott of MCI, a prominent Kramer Levin client, which Arthur saw as a personal affront. In 1992, Colorado voters passed Amendment 2, an anti-gay rights referendum, and Arthur refused to cancel a ski trip to Aspen.

Throughout their disagreements, they still stayed close, remaining each other's touchstones. Larry writes of their relationship in The Normal Heart: "The brothers love each other a great deal; [Arthur's] approval is essential to [Larry]."

In 2001, Arthur gave Yale University a $1 million grant to establish the Larry Kramer Initiative for Lesbian and Gay Studies, a program focusing on gay history.

== Later life and death ==
Kramer retired from the firm in 1996. He was found alone by a ski patrol in Sun Valley, Idaho on January 13, 2008. He ultimately died from a stroke on January 26 in New York City. He was 81 when he died, having lived in Stamford, Connecticut.

== Kramer life insurance litigation ==
In mid-2005, Kramer, then aged 78, applied for seven insurance policies from three different insurance companies, with a total value of $56.2 million. Arthur had sought a way to provide additional support and gifts to his children during his lifetime, and this action followed his considering a series of life insurance strategies over a period of two years.

He created a pair of insurance trusts to own these policies, and designated his three adult children, Andrew Kramer, Rebecca Kramer, and Liza Kramer, as the trusts' beneficiaries. Shortly after the policies were issued, before Arthur had paid the first premiums on any of the policies, he directed his children to sell their interests in the trusts to outside life settlement investors for $660,000, slightly over one per cent of the policies' worth.

Less than three years later, following Arthur's death in early 2008, his wife, Alice Kramer, who was the executor of his estate, filed suit in New York federal court, claiming that she, rather than the investors, was entitled to the $56.2 million death benefit. She claimed that Arthur, by taking out the policies and having them resold to investors, violated New York State insurable interest law; thus, the sale to the investors should be retroactively voided.

After over two years of contentious litigation, the New York Court of Appeals decided against Alice Kramer, ruling that New York insurance law allowed her husband and children to sell his insurance policies immediately after issuance to whomever they wished, provided they acted without coercion and were not subject to any nefarious influence. Her lawyer had argued that the estate's claim to the $56.2 million benefit would not result in a "windfall" to the family, but rather would "send a message" to insurance policy investors not to engage in these types of transactions.

The Kramer decision was hailed throughout the United States as a victory for the life settlement industry and as a blow to "overreaching" families wishing to undo the insurance planning of their deceased relations.
