= The Tragedy of Today's Gays =

2005 book by Larry Kramer

- Cover of the first edition
- Author: Larry Kramer
- Language: English
- Subject: Homosexuality
- Publisher: Penguin
- Publication date: 2005
- Publication place: United States
- Media type: Print (Paperback)
- ISBN: 1-58542-427-7
- OCLC: 57549810

The Tragedy of Today's Gays is a 2005 book by gay activist Larry Kramer, in which the author prints a speech he delivered at New York City's Cooper Union Hall on November 21, 2004. In the speech, Kramer urges gay men and lesbians to take action, unite as a community, and embrace safer lifestyles. The speech led to a protest, two days later, against American General Peter Pace, Chairman of the Joint Chiefs of Staff, who had previously called homosexuality "immoral."

The speech is preceded by a foreword by Naomi Wolf.

== Synopsis ==
Kramer explains this was the most difficult speech he had ever written. George W. Bush was re-elected on the trope of "moral values," which served as a synecdoche for gay men and lesbians.

Drugs which treat the symptoms of HIV or AIDS are no cure, and that their ameliorative effects will not last forever. He urges gay men and lesbians to remember those who fought for the rights of People With AIDS and for gay rights.

Quoting the research of journalist Bill Moyers, Kramer places the struggle for gay and lesbian civil rights within the structure of socioeconomic inequality in the United States, and states that those most privileged in the United States are dedicated not only to destroying the rights and lives of the poor, racial minorities, and non-Christians, but of gay men and lesbians as well. He reveals that in 1971, future Supreme Court Justice Lewis F. Powell, Jr. created a plan to "take back America for the survival of the free enterprise system. Not democracy. Free enterprise." As part of the Powell Manifesto, conservatives in America created foundations to transform one of the most liberal nations in the world into a "classist, racist, homophobic, imperial army of pirates." AIDS worked in favor of this cabal, for "Their wildest dreams then started to come true. The faggots were disappearing and they were doing it to themselves," leading Kramer to conclude, "[I]ntentionality is the only word to describe the genocidal treatment millions of bodies have been drowning in."

== Reception ==
The speech was deemed a "strident but truthful lecture" by The Boston Globe. Jose Antonio Vargas, writing in The Washington Post, called Kramer "tireless yeller" and described the book as "a sprawling polemic, a call to action, angry, frustrated, passionate." The book was cited by the Lambda Literary Foundation as evidence that Kramer had broken "new ground in the field of LGBT literature and publishing," leading the group to honor him with a Pioneer Award.
