= Scott Robbe =

American television and film producer (1955–2021)

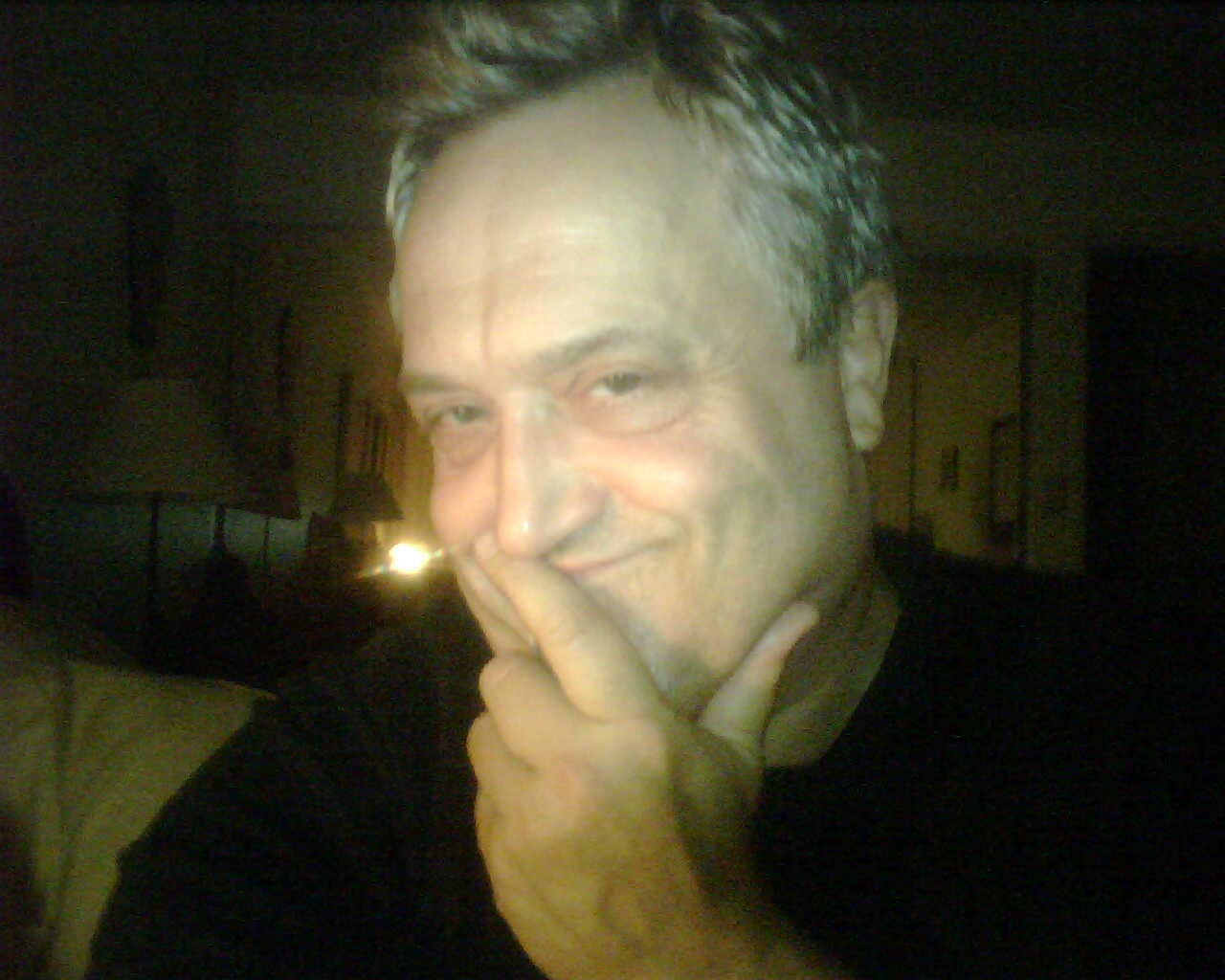
Robbe in 2013

Scott Douglas Robbe (February 16, 1955 – November 21, 2021) was an American film, television, and theater producer/director, and veteran activist. He was a prominent founding member of both ACT UP and Queer Nation. In 2009 he founded his production company, Feed Your Head Productions.

== Career ==
Robbe's first theatrical production was False Promises by The San Francisco Mime Troupe. He later managed and produced shows On Broadway and Off Broadway in New York, including Harvey Fierstein's play Safe Sex at the Lyceum Theater.

Robbe's first film was In the King of Prussia: he served as associate producer and production manager for director Emile de Antonio. Robbe's television credits include producing credits for Lifetime, Comedy Central, VH1, WonderWorks, Children's Television Workshop, Bravo Channel and American Playhouse. Robbe also served as the executive director and film commissioner for Wisconsin's industry office Film Wisconsin, Inc. bringing Michael Mann's film Public Enemies to film in Wisconsin.

Robbe interviewed playwright Larry Kramer for HBO's program Larry Kramer: In Love with Anger and for his 2012 documentary on Act Up! (with a same title).

Robbe's home renovation series for DIY Network, Vanilla Ice Goes Amish, won RealScreen awards.

In 2019 Scott Robbe gave a speech on MCC Pride: Looking Back Loving Forward.

== Filmography ==
- Seven and a Match (2001) – executive producer
- Vanilla Ice Goes Amish – (2013) senior producer
- Act Up! (2012) director
- Queer Eye (2003) – co-supervising producer
- Melissa Etheridge: Custom Concert (2001) – line producer
- VH1 Presents: Bon Jovi - One Last Wild Night (2001) – line producer
- Christmas Dream (2000) – line producer
- Diana: Legacy of a Princess (1998) – coordinating producer
- Pirate Tales (1997) – drama producer
- The Main Ingredient with Bobby Flay (1996) – line producer
- Late Date with Sari (1995) – line producer
- 30 Years of National Geographic Specials (1995) – associate producer
- Out There (1993) – line producer
- Traitor in My House (1990) – line producer

=== Stage ===
- Safe Sex – associate producer
- San Francisco Mime Troupe – producer

=== Acting ===
- ’’King of Prussia’’ – Officer J. A. Bolling
