= Reports from the Holocaust =

1989 book by Larry Kramer

Reports from the Holocaust: The Making of an AIDS Activist
- Cover of the first edition
- Author: Larry Kramer
- Language: English
- Subject: HIV/AIDS
- Publisher: St. Martin's Press
- Publication date: 1989
- Publication place: United States
- Media type: Print (hardcover and paperback)
- ISBN: 0-312-11419-2
- OCLC: 30665452

Reports from the Holocaust: The Making of an AIDS Activist is a 1989 book by Larry Kramer; a revised edition was published in 1994. Reports from the Holocaust contains a diverse selection of Kramer's nonfiction writings focused on AIDS activism and LGBT civil rights, including letters to the editor and speeches, which document his time spent at Gay Men's Health Crisis, ACT UP, and beyond.

== Overview ==
The central message of the book is that gay men must accept responsibility for their lives, and that those who are still living must give back to their community by fighting for People With AIDS (PWAs) and LGBT rights, for, as Kramer states, "I must put back something into this world for my own life, which is worth a tremendous amount. By not putting back, you are saying that your lives are worth shit, and that we deserve to die, and that the deaths of all our friends and lovers have amounted to nothing. I can't believe that in your heart of hearts you feel this way. I can't believe you want to die. Do you?" The first publication provides a portrait of Kramer as activist, and the 1994 edition contains commentary written by him that reflects on his earlier pieces and provides insight into Larry Kramer as writer.

== Thoughts on the LGBT response to AIDS activism ==
Kramer raises the question of whether modern LGBT organizations are complicit in the oppression of their own members and the Holocaust that is AIDS, by cooperating with heterosexual society and passively collaborating in the genocide against gay men that Kramer recognizes AIDS to be, making them into gay "Uncle Toms" that value their own personal finances and prestige at the expense of the LGBT individuals and PWA's they claim to represent. Toward the goal of preventing this occurrence, the collection contains information for individuals that are committed to social justice but currently corralled in nonprofit LGBT organizations that refuse to adopt a political stance.

Kramer also addresses claims made by leaders of some LGBT organizations that they are unable to act politically, even when faced with a health crisis that he believes must be defined as a plague, because their 501(c)(3) tax status, a classification which permits them to receive tax deductible donations, would be lost. Kramer contends that, from a practical perspective, if the Catholic Church, the Salvation Army, the American Cancer Society, and Sloan-Kettering can pursue political activism while preserving their nonprofit status, so too can organizations who fight for LGBT rights and People With AIDS. He further responds that such organizations cannot hide behind this bureaucratic cover, for these groups may easily reorganize to include a 501(c)(4) division that is not tax exempt, while allowing the tax deductible status of the remaining branches of the organization to continue.

== Exploration of individual empowerment ==
In some sections of the book, Kramer focuses on the concept of individual empowerment, and how those who feel powerless may gain influence by taking responsibility, even for what would appear to be insignificant, mundane tasks. As Kramer states in a 1987 speech contained in the volume:

Power is little pieces of paper on the floor. No one picks them up. Ten people walk by and no one picks up the piece of paper on the floor. The eleventh person walks by and is tired of looking at it, and so he bends down and picks it up. The next day he does the same thing. And soon he's in charge of picking up the paper. And he's got a lot of pieces of paper that he's picked up. Now- think of those pieces of paper as standing for responsibility. This man or woman who is picking up the pieces of paper is, by being responsible, acquiring more and more power. He doesn't necessarily want it, but he's tired of seeing the floor littered. All power is the willingness to accept responsibility.

These ideas are further reinforced in a speech given several years later, in which Kramer states, "Your voice is your power. Your collective voices. Your group power. Names all strung together on membership lists are power. Bodies all strung together in a line are power."

== Use of the term "Holocaust" and criticism of the response to AIDS ==
Kramer directly and deliberately defines AIDS as a Holocaust because he believes the United States' government failed to respond quickly and expend the necessary resources to cure AIDS, largely because AIDS initially infected gay men, and, quite soon after, predominantly poor and politically powerless minorities. Through speeches, editorials, and personal, sometimes publicized, letters to figures such as politician Gary Bauer, former New York Mayor Ed Koch, several New York Times reporters, and head of the National Institute of Allergy and Infectious Diseases, Anthony Fauci, Kramer personally advocates for a more significant response to AIDS. He implores the government to conduct research based on commonly accepted scientific standards and to allocate funds and personnel to AIDS research. Kramer ultimately states that the response to AIDS in America must be defined as a Holocaust because of the large number deaths that resulted from the negligence and apathy that surrounded AIDS in the Ronald Reagan, George H. W. Bush, and early Bill Clinton Presidencies. Kramer also describes his frustration with many members of the gay community that do not actively advocate for PWAs and AIDS research, stating that they are complicit in their own deaths.

== Self reflection and insights in the 1994 edition ==
In 1994, Kramer's book was expanded to include some of his more recent pieces, as well as Kramer's own commentary on the original selections. In this commentary, Kramer provides his thoughts on some of his audiences, his speaking style, and his approach to writing and revision. For example, he informs the reader that during one speech, "I delivered this list while staring Cardinal O'Connor right in the eye," and reveals at another point that, "the audience for this symposium appeared to be composed mostly of elderly men and women, with nothing else to do, who filled their days attending activities like this one, costing nothing. The first time the word 'gay' was mentioned, a number of them got up and walked out. While I spoke, I saw only stony faces and icy stares."

He also offers a glimpse into his approach to writing and revision. For example, at one point Kramer questions his use of anaphora in the repetition of the phrase, "Oh, My People" in one of his speeches by writing in the commentary, "I guess it looks corny in print, but it sounded good in the Waldorf [where the speech was delivered]. If it does seem too much (Wise Friends had recommended 'Oh, My Friends')- well, it won't be the first time I’ve erred in that direction. Anyway, I like it."

== Sources ==
- Kramer, Larry (1994). Reports from the Holocaust: The Story of an AIDS Activist. St. Martin's Press. ISBN 0-312-11419-2.
