= History of male homosexuality =

Homosexuality is defined as a sexual orientation characterized by a romantic attraction, sexual attraction, or sexual behavior exclusively between people of the same sex or gender; as well as "a person's sense of identity based on those attractions, related behaviors, and membership in a community of others who share those attractions." Male homosexuality is thus the emotional or sexual attraction between two or more men individuals, whether they were assigned male at birth or identify as such; men who identify as homosexuals or display homosexual behavior are known as gay men.

Societal attitudes towards same-sex relationships between men have varied over time and place. Attitudes to male homosexuality have varied from requiring males to engage in same-sex relationships to casual integration, through acceptance, to seeing the practice as a minor sin, repressing it through law enforcement and judicial mechanisms, and to proscribing it under penalty of death. In addition, it has varied as to whether any negative attitudes towards men who have sex with men have extended to all participants, as has been common in Abrahamic religions, or more towards passive (penetrated) participants, as was common in Ancient Greece and Ancient Rome. Which acts are considered "sexual", "lustful", or "romantic" have also differed throughout history. At various times, actions such as bed-sharing, cuddling, passionate declarations of love, and even kissing have been considered appropriate within same-sex friendships and/or unacceptable within the context of opposite-sex friendships and even marriage.

Male homosexuality was generally tolerated in many Ancient and Medieval Eastern cultures such as those influenced by Buddhism, Hinduism, and Taoism. Homophobia in the eastern world is often discussed in the context of being an import from the western world. Some have contended that definitions of "progress" on homosexuality (e.g. LGBT rights) as being Western-centric.

Many male historical figures, including Socrates, Lord Byron, Edward II, and Hadrian, have had terms such as gay or bisexual applied to them; some scholars, such as Michel Foucault, have regarded this as risking the anachronistic introduction of a contemporary social construct of sexuality foreign to their times, though others challenge this. A common thread of constructionist argument is that no one in antiquity or the Middle Ages experienced homosexuality as an exclusive, permanent, or defining mode of sexuality. John Boswell has countered this argument by citing ancient Greek writings by Plato, which describe individuals exhibiting exclusive homosexuality.

== Africa ==
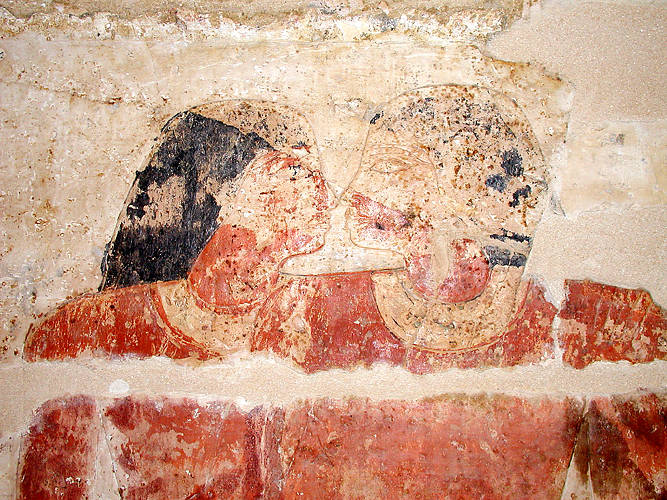
Nyankh-khnum and Khnum-hotep kissing.

=== Egypt ===
Homosexuality in ancient Egypt is a passionately disputed subject within Egyptology: historians and egyptologists alike debate what kind of view the Ancient Egyptian society fostered about homosexuality. Only a handful of direct hints have survived to this day and many possible indications are only vague and offer plenty of room for speculation.

The best known case of possible homosexuality in Ancient Egypt is that of the two high officials Nyankh-Khnum and Khnum-hotep. Both men lived and served under pharaoh Niuserre during the 5th Dynasty (c. 2494–2345 BC). Nyankh-Khnum and Khnum-hotep each had families of their own with children and wives, but when they died their families apparently decided to bury them together in one and the same mastaba tomb. In this mastaba, several paintings depict both men embracing each other and touching their faces nose-on-nose. These depictions leave plenty of room for speculation, because in Ancient Egypt the nose-on-nose touching normally represented a kiss.

Egyptologists and historians disagree about how to interpret the paintings of Nyankh-khnum and Khnum-hotep. Some scholars believe that the paintings reflect an example of homosexuality between two married men and prove that the Ancient Egyptians accepted same-sex relationships. Other scholars disagree and interpret the scenes as an evidence that Nyankh-khnum and Khnum-hotep were twins, even possibly conjoined twins.

It is unclear what exact views the Ancient Egyptians held on homosexuality. All surviving documents and literature that contained sexually orientated stories never name the nature of the sexual deeds, but instead uses stilted and flowery euphemisms. While the stories about Seth and his sexual behavior may reveal rather negative thoughts and views, the tomb inscription of Nyankh-khnum and Khnum-hotep may instead suggest that homosexuality was likewise accepted. Ancient Egyptian documents never clearly say that same-sex relationships were seen as reprehensible or despicable. And no Ancient Egyptian document mentions that homosexual acts were set under penalty. Thus, a straight evaluation remains problematic.

=== Uganda ===
In the 19th century Mwanga II (1868–1903) the Kabaka of Buganda regularly had sex with his male page.

== The Americas ==
=== Pre-colonization Indigenous societies ===
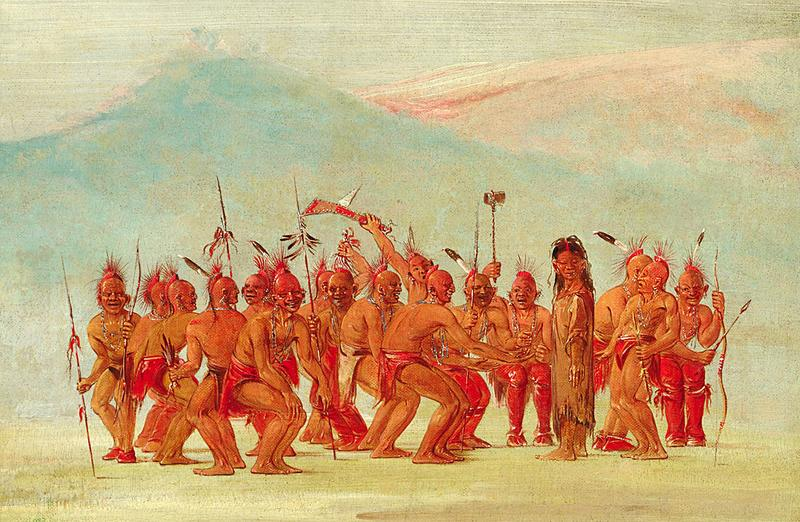
Drawing by George Catlin (1796–1872) while on the Great Plains among the Sac and Fox Nation. Depicting a group of male warriors dancing around a male-bodied person in a woman's dress, non-Native artist George Catlin titled the painting Dance to the Berdache.

Among Indigenous peoples of the Americas prior to European colonization, a number of Nations had respected ceremonial and social roles for homosexual, bisexual, and gender-nonconforming individuals in their communities; in many contemporary Native American and First Nations communities, these roles still exist. While each Indigenous culture has their own names for these individuals, a modern, pan-Indian term that was adopted in 1990 is "Two-Spirit". This new term has not been universally accepted, having been criticized by traditional communities who already have their own terms for the people being grouped under this "urban neologism", and by those who reject what they call the "western" binary implications, such as implying that Natives believe these individuals are "both male and female". However, it has generally met with more acceptance than the anthropological term it replaced.

Homosexual and gender-variant individuals were also common among other pre-conquest civilizations in Latin America, such as the Aztecs, Mayans, Quechuas, Moches, Zapotecs, and the Tupinambá of Brazil.

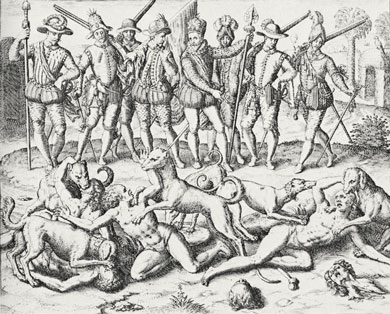
The explorer Vasco Núñez de Balboa setting his war dogs upon Indigenous men who expressed same-sex attractions, 1513; New York Public Library

The Spanish conquerors were horrified to discover homosexual sex openly practiced among native peoples, and attempted to crush it out by subjecting whom they dubbed berdaches under their rule to severe penalties, including public execution, burning and being torn to pieces by dogs.

=== Post-colonization ===
In the United States, Homosexual activity appears to have increased in urban areas during the 19th century, along with other unorthodox sexual activity. At this time, sexual pleasure even within marriage was still being normalized in the Victorian era and into the 1910s. Sex outside of marriage, in any context, was generally still seen as somewhat deviant. Historian Hanne Blank notes that this is part of a broader Enlightenment trend of using science to pathologize moral transgressions that had previously been regulated by the church.

== Asia ==
=== East Asia ===
In East Asia, same-sex love has been referred to since the earliest recorded history.

==== China ====
Homosexuality is widely documented in ancient China and attitudes towards it varied through time, location, and social class. Chinese literature recorded multiple anecdotes of men engaging in homosexual relationships. In the story of the leftover peach(余桃), set during the Spring and Autumn Era, the historian Han Fei recorded an anecdote in the relationship of Mi Zixia (彌子瑕) and Duke Ling of Wei (衛靈公) in which Mizi Xia shared an especially delicious peach with his lover. The story of the cut sleeve(断袖) recorded the Emperor Ai of Han sharing a bed with his lover, Dongxian (董賢); when Emperor Ai woke up later, he carefully cut off his sleeve, so as not to awake Dongxian, who had fallen asleep on top of it. Scholar Pan Guangdan (潘光旦) came to the conclusion that many emperors in the Han dynasty had one or more male sex partners. However, except in unusual cases, such as Emperor Ai, the men named for their homosexual relationships in the official histories appear to have had active heterosexual lives as well.

With the rise of the Tang dynasty, China became increasingly influenced by the sexual mores of foreigners from Western and Central Asia, and female companions began to replace male companions in terms of power and familial standings. The following Song dynasty was the last dynasty to include a chapter on male companions of the emperors in official documents. During these dynasties, the general attitude toward homosexuality was still tolerant, but male lovers started to be seen as less legitimate compared to wives and men are usually expected to get married and continue the family line.

During the Ming Dynasty, it is said that the Zhengde Emperor had a homosexual relationship with a Muslim leader named Sayyid Husain. In later Ming Dynasty, homosexuality began to be referred to as the "southern custom" due to the fact that Fujian was the site of a unique system of male marriages, attested to by the scholar-bureaucrat Shen Defu and the writer Li Yu, and mythologized by in the folk tale, The Leveret Spirit.

The Qing dynasty instituted the first law against consensual, non-monetized homosexuality in China. However, the punishment designated, which included a month in prison and 100 heavy blows, was actually the lightest punishment which existed in the Qing legal system. Homosexuality started to become eliminated in China by the Self-Strengthening Movement, when homophobia was imported to China along with Western science and philosophy.

==== Japan ====
Homosexuality in Japan, variously known as shudo or nanshoku, has been documented for over one thousand years and had some connections to the Buddhist monastic life and the samurai tradition. This same-sex love culture gave rise to strong traditions of painting and literature documenting and celebrating such relationships.

==== Thailand ====
Similarly, in Thailand, kathoey, or "ladyboys," have been a feature of Thai society for many centuries, and Thai kings had male as well as female lovers. While kathoey may encompass simple effeminacy or transvestism, it most commonly is treated in Thai culture as a third gender. They are generally accepted by society.

=== South Asia ===
South Asia has a recorded and verifiable history of homosexuality going back to at least 1200 BC. Hindu medical texts written in India from this period document homosexual acts and attempt to explain the cause in a neutral/scientific manner. Numerous artworks and literary works from this period also describe homosexuality. The Pali Cannon, written in Sri Lanka between 600 BC and 100 BC, states that sexual relations, whether of homosexual or of heterosexual nature, is forbidden in the monastic code, and states that any acts of soft homosexual sex (such as masturbation and interfemural sex) does not entail a punishment but must be confessed to the monastery. These codes apply to monks only and not to the general population. The Kama Sutra written in India around 200 AD also described numerous homosexual sex acts positively.

The Laws of Manu, the foundational work of Hindu law, mentions a "third sex", members of which may engage in nontraditional gender expression and homosexual activities. The Kama Sutra, written in the 4th century, describes techniques by which homosexuals perform fellatio. Further, such homosexual men were also known to marry, according to the Kama Sutra: "There are also third-sex citizens, sometimes greatly attached to one another and with complete faith in one another, who get married together." (KS 2.9.36).

== Europe ==
=== Antiquity ===
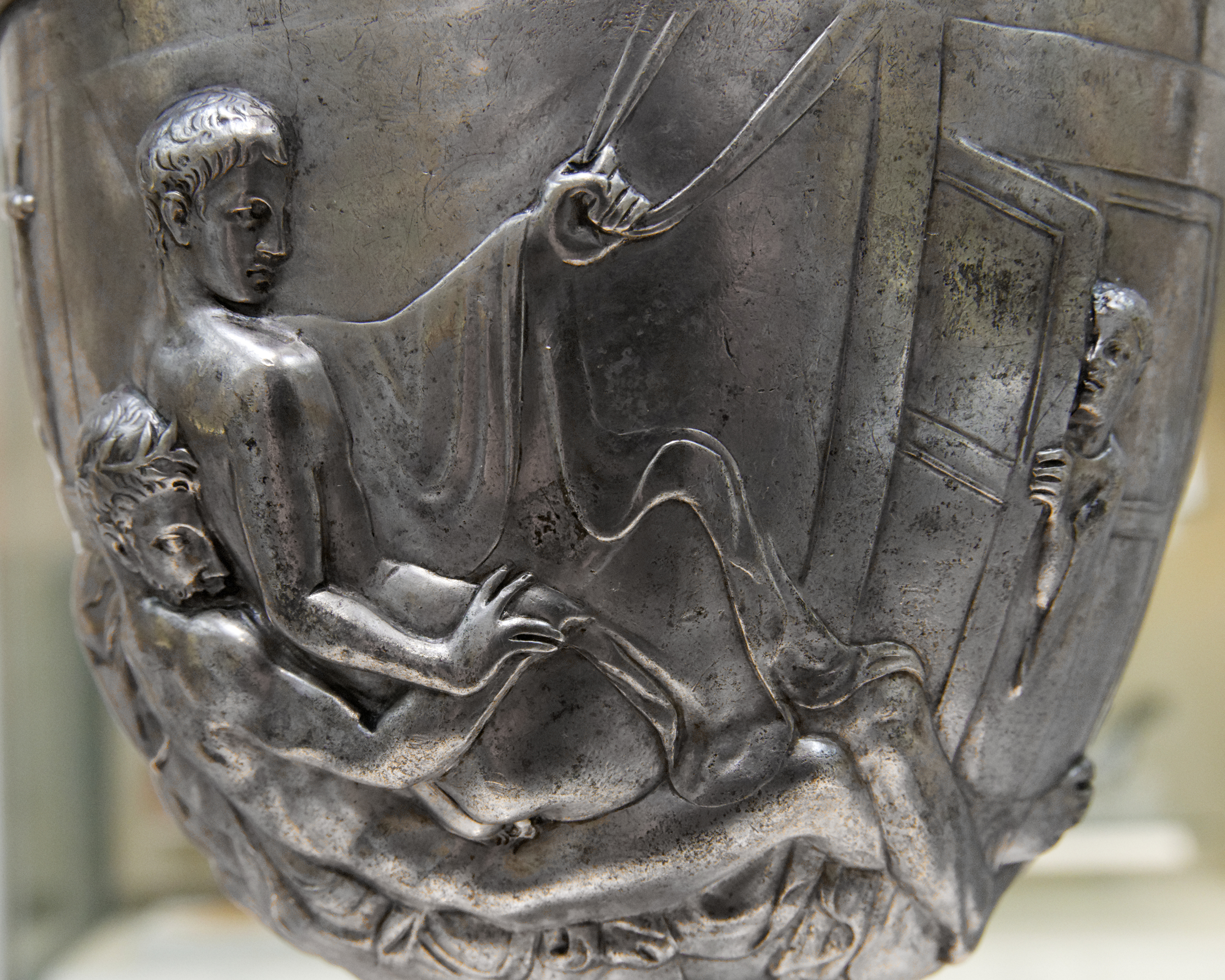
Roman man penetrating a youth, middle of the 1st century AD. Found in Bittir (?), near Jerusalem

The earliest Western documents (in the form of literary works, art objects, and mythographic materials) concerning same-sex relationships are derived from ancient Greece.

The formal practice, an erotic yet often restrained relationship between a free-born (i.e. not a slave or freedman) adult male and a free-born adolescent, was valued for its pedagogic benefits and as a means of population control, though occasionally blamed for causing societal disorder. In the Symposium, Plato has Phaedrus praising its benefits whilst Socrates encourages Platonic relationship between older and younger men, and in his late work, proposed the prohibition of sexual relationship between men entirely saying that it is unnatural.

Aristotle, in his Politics, dismissed Plato's ideas about abolishing homosexuality (2.4); he explains that barbarians like the Celts accorded it a special honour (2.6.6), while the Cretans used it to regulate the population (2.7.5).

In ancient Rome, homosexual acts are documented. The kind of homosexuality seen often took the form of pederasty, where older free men took an active role and slaves or freed youths took a receptive role in sex. Passive homosexuality was often criticised or even ridiculed, with pederastic relations considered legitimate only when directed towards slaves. The Hellenophile emperor Hadrian is renowned for his relationship with Antinous. However, after the transition to Christianity, by 390 A.D., Emperor Theodosius I made homosexuality a legally punishable offense for the passive partner: "All persons who have the shameful custom of condemning a man's body, acting the part of a woman's to the sufferance of alien sex (for they appear not to be different from women), shall expiate a crime of this kind in avenging flames in the sight of the people." In 558, toward the end of his reign, Justinian expanded the proscription to the active partner as well, warning that such conduct can lead to the destruction of cities through the "wrath of God". Notwithstanding these regulations, taxes on brothels of boys available for homosexual sex continued to be collected until the end of the reign of Anastasius I in 518.

=== The Middle Ages ===
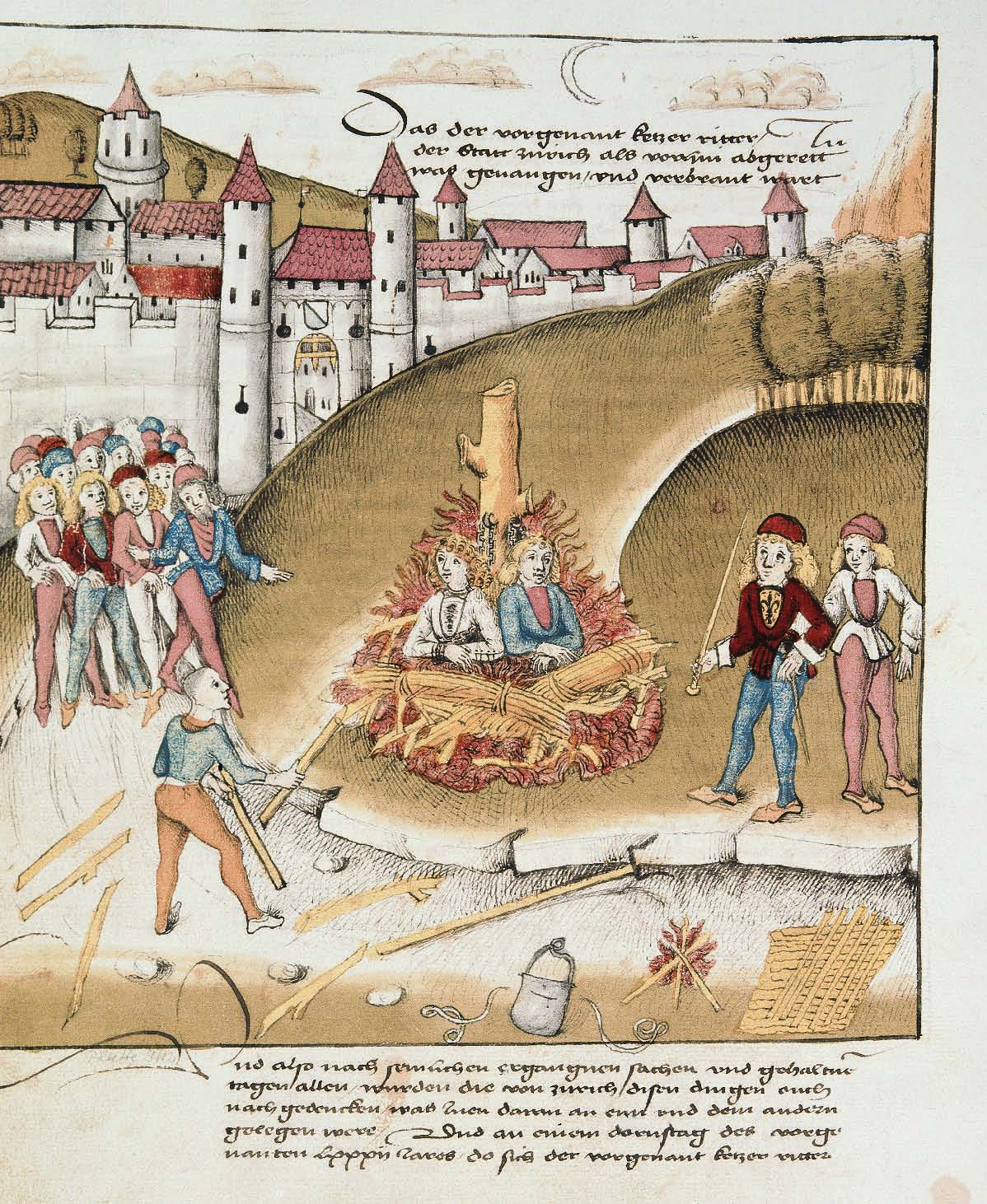
Two males, Richard Puller von Hohenburg and Anton Mätzler, accused of sodomy burned at the stake, Zurich 1482 (Zurich Central Library)

Through the medieval period in Europe, homosexuality fell under the umbrella of "sodomy"—any sexual act performed for pleasure, and not reproduction—and was considered unnatural ("contra naturam") and sinful under the doctrine of the Catholic Church.

There is evidence in songs and plays from this era that these same-sex acts did occur, but there was no sexual identity assigned. Like all sins, anyone was capable of giving into desire. Historian Hanne Blank described the term "sodomite" as "not an identity label but a rap sheet".

There were legal arrangements called adelphopoiesis ("brother-making") in the Eastern Mediterranean or affrèrement ("embrotherment") in France that allowed two men to share living quarters and pool their resources, sharing "one bread, one wine, one purse." During this time, "romantic friendship" was common, and may have included bed-sharing, non-sexual physical forms of intimacy, and passionate declarations of affection. Historians such as John Boswell and Allan A. Tulchin have argued that these arrangements amounted to an early form of same-sex marriage. This interpretation of these arrangements remains controversial.

Historians debate if there were any prominent homosexuals and bisexuals at this time, but it is argued that figures such as Edward II, Richard the Lionheart, Philip II Augustus, and William Rufus were engaged in same-sex relationships.

=== The Renaissance ===
During the Renaissance, wealthy cities in northern Italy—Florence and Venice in particular—were renowned for their widespread practice of same-sex love, engaged in by a considerable part of the male population and constructed along with the classical pattern of Greece and Rome. But even as many of the male population were engaging in same-sex relationships, the authorities, under the aegis of the Officers of the Night, were prosecuting, fining, and imprisoning a good portion of that population. Many of the prominent artists who defined the Renaissance such as Michelangelo and Leonardo da Vinci are believed to have had relationships with men. The decline of this period of relative artistic and erotic freedom was precipitated by the rise to power of the moralizing monk Girolamo Savonarola.

In England, gay brothels have been recorded dating back to the early 17th century. Geoffrey Chaucer's "The Pardoner's Tale" centered around an enigmatic and deceptive character who is also at one point described as "a gelding or a mare", suggesting that the narrator thought the Pardoner to be either a eunuch ("gelding") or a homosexual.

=== Modernity ===
==== Early Modernity ====
Records of "molly houses"—public houses where men had sex with other men—in England date back from 1700 into the 1730s. It was common for men to address each other using feminine nicknames, though there is no evidence of any other gender nonconforming behavior that might today be considered indicative of a transgender identity. When information about them reached the public, there was widespread outrage in the press.

European Enlightenment ideas contributed to the French revolutionaries indirectly decriminalising gay sex in 1789 as part of the separation of secular and religious laws, though homophobia remained rampant in both secular and religious governments in an attempt to uphold the "highest moral standards".

The relationships of socially prominent figures, such as King James I and the Duke of Buckingham, served to highlight the issue, including in anonymously authored street pamphlets: "The world is chang'd I know not how, For men Kiss Men, not Women now;...Of J. the First and Buckingham: He, true it is, his Wives Embraces fled, To slabber his lov'd Ganimede"

The anonymous Love Letters Between a Certain Late Nobleman and the Famous Mr. Wilson was published in 1723 in England and was presumed by some modern scholars to be a novel.

The 1749 edition of John Cleland's popular novel Fanny Hill includes a homosexual scene, but this was removed in its 1750 edition. Also in 1749, the earliest extended and serious defense of homosexuality in English, Ancient and Modern Pederasty Investigated and Exemplified, written by Thomas Cannon, was published, but was suppressed almost immediately. It includes the passage: "Unnatural Desire is a Contradiction in Terms; downright Nonsense. Desire is an amatory Impulse of the inmost human Parts." Around 1785 Jeremy Bentham wrote another defense, but this was not published until 1978. Executions for sodomy continued in the Netherlands until 1803 and in England until 1835.

While sexual relationships between women were even less documented, the Enlightenment-era English euphemism "game at flatts" was used to refer to sex between women, both of whom had "flat" genitals—indicating that some were aware of these relationships.

==== Late Modernity ====
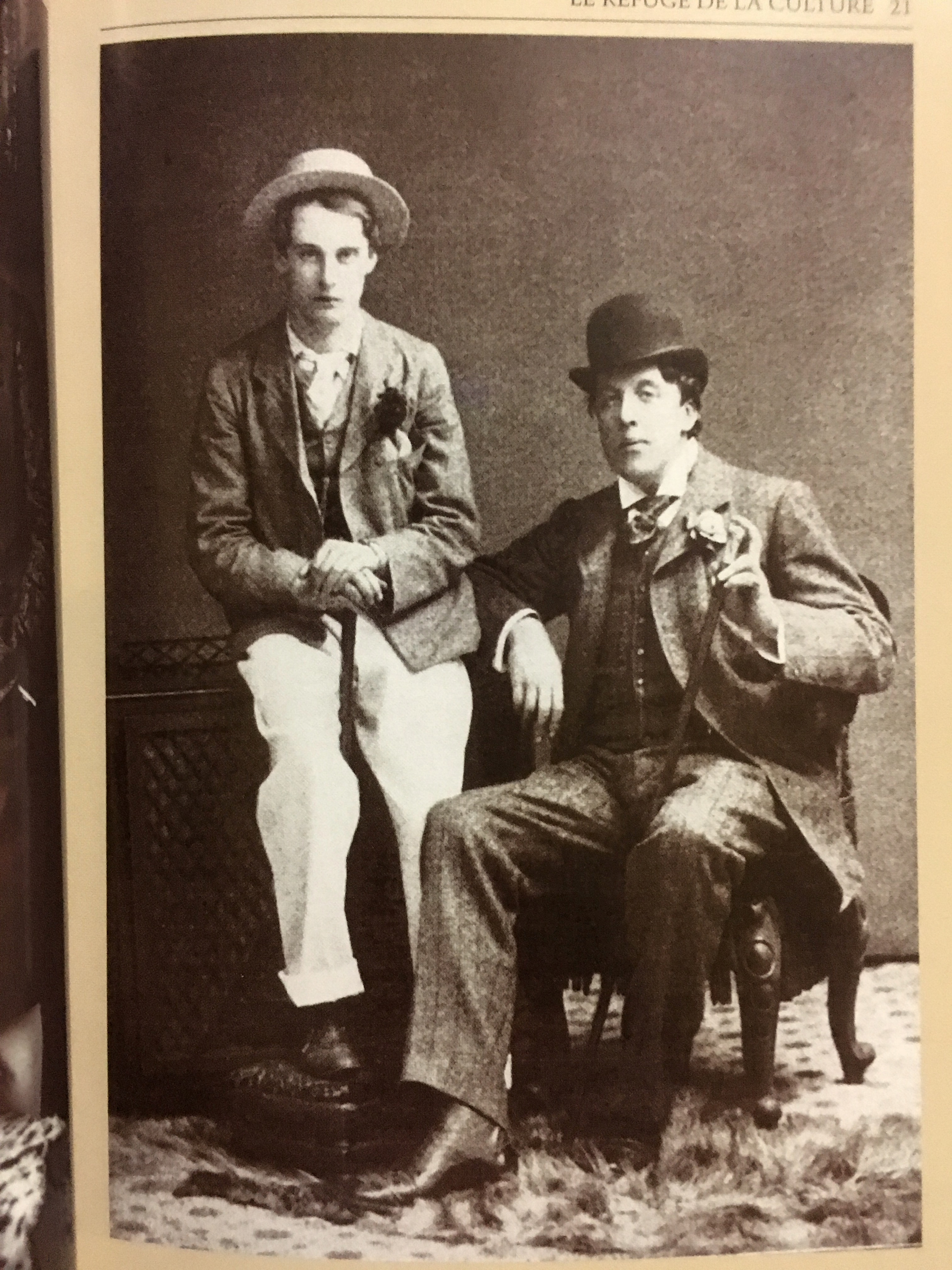
Oscar Wilde and Alfred Douglas, found in La longue marche des gays (collection "Découvertes Gallimard" [vol. 417]), a book by Frédéric Martel.

Homosexual activity appears to have increased in urban areas during the 19th century, along with other unorthodox sexual activity. At this time, sexual pleasure even within marriage was still being normalized in the Victorian era and into the 1910s. Sex outside of marriage, in any context, was generally still seen as somewhat deviant.

Between 1864 and 1880, German writer Karl Heinrich Ulrichs published a series of twelve tracts, which he collectively titled Research on the Riddle of Man-Manly Love. In 1867 he became the first self-proclaimed queer person to speak out publicly in defense of homosexuality when he pleaded at the Congress of German Jurists in Munich for a resolution urging the repeal of anti-homosexual laws, which had labeled sex between men as "unnatural fornication". Ulrichs defined himself as a "sexual invert"—someone with a male body, but a female mind, though he is not known to have displayed any other characteristics that would today be associated with a transgender identity. (At this time, there was no common distinction in the Western world between biological sex and gender.)

Karl Maria Kertbeny, a Hungarian living in Berlin, is believed to be the first person to coin the term homosexual in 1868, in a public letter aiming to create terminology to replace the derogatory terms sodomite and pederast. He advocated for the acceptance of same-sex relations on the basis that these sexual acts did not harm others and therefore were not evil. He also argued that queer men were just as masculine and virile as "normalsexual" men.

In 1886, Austrian psychiatrist Richard von Krafft-Ebing defined the terms homosexual and heterosexual, in his book Psychopathia Sexualis. Krafft-Ebing's book was so popular among both laymen and doctors that the terms heterosexual and homosexual became the most widely accepted terms for sexual orientation. Historian Hanne Blank notes that this is part of a broader Enlightenment trend of using science to pathologize moral transgressions that had previously been regulated by the church.

Sexual Inversion by Havelock Ellis, published in 1896, challenged theories that homosexuality was abnormal, as well as stereotypes, and insisted on the ubiquity of homosexuality and its association with intellectual and artistic achievement. Although medical texts like these (written partly in Latin to obscure the sexual details) were not widely read by the general public, they did lead to the rise of Magnus Hirschfeld's Scientific Humanitarian Committee, which campaigned from 1897 to 1933 against anti-sodomy laws in Germany, as well as a much more informal, unpublicized movement among British intellectuals and writers, led by such figures as Edward Carpenter and John Addington Symonds.

Beginning in 1894 with Homogenic Love, Socialist activist and poet Edward Carpenter wrote a string of pro-homosexual articles and pamphlets, and "came out" in 1916 in his book My Days and Dreams.

In 1900, Elisar von Kupffer published an anthology of homosexual literature from antiquity to his own time, Lieblingminne und Freundesliebe in der Weltliteratur. His aim was to broaden the public perspective of homosexuality beyond its being viewed simply as a medical or biological issue, but also as an ethical and cultural one.

Sigmund Freud appears to have been undecided whether or not homosexuality was pathological, expressing different views on this issue at different times and places in his work. Freud believed that all humans were bisexual, by which he primarily meant that everyone incorporates aspects of both sexes, and that everyone is sexually attracted to both sexes.

These developments suffered several setbacks, both coincidental and deliberate. For example, in 1895, famed playwright Oscar Wilde was convicted of "gross indecency" in the United Kingdom, and lurid details from the trials (especially those involving young male sex workers) led to increased scrutiny of all facets of relationships between men. The most destructive backlash occurred when the Third Reich specifically targeted LGBT people in the Holocaust.

== Middle East and Central Asia ==
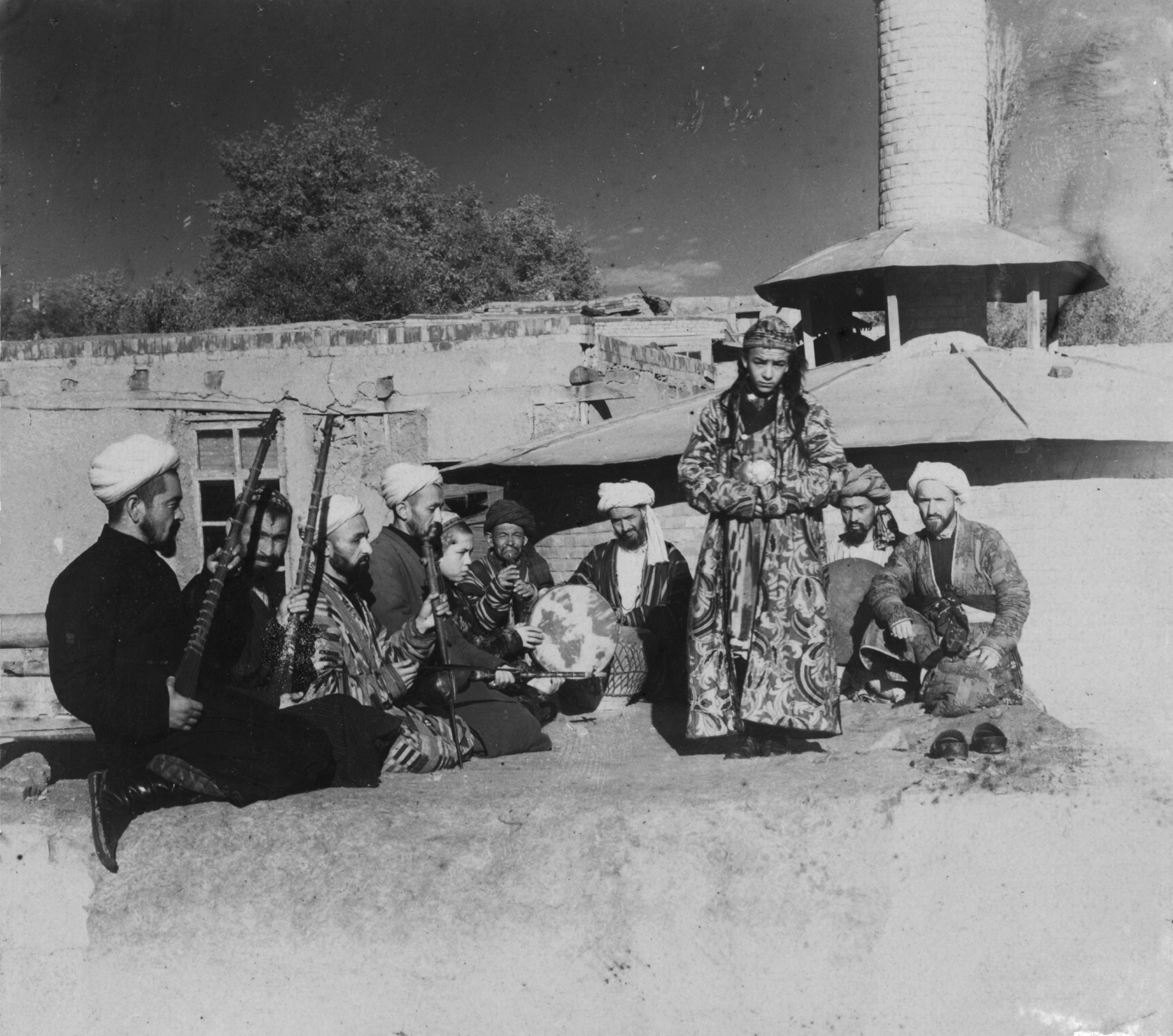
Dance of a bacchá (dancing boy) Samarkand, (ca 1905–1915), photo Sergei Mikhailovich Prokudin-Gorskii. Library of Congress, Washington, DC.

=== Mesopotamia ===
It is thought that ancient Assyria (2nd millennium BC to 1st millennium AD) viewed homosexuality as negative and at least criminal, with their interpretations of religious codes of Zoroastrianism forbidding homosexuality, and the rise of Judaism, Christianity and Islam leading to homophobia in much of the western world; the majority of the ancient sources prior to the onset of the Abrahamic religions present homosexuality in the form of male domination or rape.

Some ancient religious Assyrian texts may have contained prayers for divine blessings on homosexual relationships, though the same sources acknowledge that homosexuality was regarded as reprehensible, and criminal. Freely pictured art of homosexual anal sex, practiced as part of a religious ritual, dates from the 3rd millennium BC and onwards. Homosexual relationships with royal attendants, between soldiers, and those where a social better was submissive or penetrated were treated as rape or seen as bad omens, and punishments were applied.

=== Abrahamic religions ===
Abrahamic religions played a key role in the spread of homophobia in further Asia, such as Islam through the Mongol Empire, where homosexuality was banned, to parts of Central Asia, Southern Asia and the Sinosphere, or Christianity through European colonialism.

=== 1800s ===
There are a handful of accounts by Arab travelers to Europe during the mid-1800s. Two of these travelers, Rifa'ah al-Tahtawi and Muhammad al-Saffar, show their surprise that the French sometimes deliberately mis-translated love poetry about a young boy, instead referring to a young woman, to maintain their social norms and morals.

=== Present day ===
Among modern Middle Eastern countries, same-sex intercourse officially carries the death penalty in several nations, including Saudi Arabia and Iran. Today, governments in the Middle East often ignore, deny the existence of, or criminalize homosexuality. Then Iranian President Mahmoud Ahmadinejad, during his 2007 speech at Columbia University, asserted that there were no gay people in Iran. Gay people do live in Iran, however they are forced to keep their sexuality veiled from the society, funded and encouraged by government legislation and traditional norms.

== Oceania ==
In many societies of Melanesia, especially in Papua New Guinea, same-sex relationships were an integral part of the culture until the middle of the last century. The Etoro and Marind-anim for example, even viewed heterosexuality as sinful and celebrated homosexuality instead. In many traditional Melanesian cultures a prepubertal boy would be paired with an older adolescent who would become his mentor and who would "inseminate" him (orally, anally, or topically, depending on the tribe) over a number of years in order for the younger to also reach puberty. Many Melanesian societies, however, have become hostile towards same-sex relationships since the introduction of Christianity by European missionaries.

== Post–World War II ==
=== The Western world ===
After World War II, the history of homosexuality in Western societies progressed on very similar and often intertwined paths.

In 1948, American biologist Alfred Kinsey published Sexual Behavior in the Human Male, popularly known as the Kinsey Reports. In 1957, the UK government commissioned the Wolfenden report to review the country's anti-sodomy laws; the final report advised decriminalizing consensual homosexual conduct, though the laws were not actually changed for another ten years.

Homosexuality was deemed to be a psychiatric disorder for many years, although the studies this theory was based on were later determined to be flawed. In 1973 homosexuality was declassified as a mental illness in the United Kingdom. In 1987 all references to homosexuality as a psychiatric disorder were removed from the Diagnostic and Statistical Manual of Mental Disorders (DSM) of the American Psychiatric Association.

==== LGBTQ rights movements ====
During the Sexual Revolution, the different-sex sexual ideal became completely separated from procreation, yet at the same time was distanced from same-sex sexuality. Many people viewed this freeing of different-sex sexuality as leading to more freedom for same-sex sexuality.

The Stonewall riots were a series of violent conflicts between New York City police officers and the patrons of the Stonewall Inn, a gay hangout in Greenwich Village. The riot began on Friday, June 27, 1969, during a routine police raid, when trans women and men, gay men, lesbians, street queens, and other street people fought back in the spirit of the civil rights movements of the era. This riot ended on the morning of 28 June, but smaller demonstrations occurred in the neighborhood throughout the remainder of the week. In the aftermath of the riots, many gay rights organizations formed such as the Gay Liberation Front (GLF). A year later the first gay pride march was held to mark the anniversary of the uprising.

== Historiographic considerations ==
In an 1868 letter to Karl Heinrich Ulrichs, the terms homosexual and heterosexual were coined by Karl-Maria Kertbeny and then published in two pamphlets in 1869. These became the standard terms when used by Richard von Krafft-Ebing in his Psychopathia Sexualis (1886). The term bisexuality was invented in the 20th century as sexual identities became defined by the predominant sex to which people are attracted and thus a label was needed for those who are not predominantly attracted to one sex. This points out that the history of sexuality is not solely the history of different-sex sexuality plus the history of same-sex sexuality, but a broader conception viewing of historical events in light of our modern concept or concepts of sexuality taken at its most broad and/or literal definitions.

Historical personalities are often described using modern sexual identity terms such as straight, bisexual, gay or queer. Those who favour the practice say that this can highlight such issues as discriminatory historiography by, for example, putting into relief the extent to which same-sex sexual experiences are excluded from biographies of noted figures, or to which sensibilities resulting from same-sex attraction are excluded from literary and artistic consideration of important works, and so on. As well as that, an opposite situation is possible in the modern society: some LGBT-supportive researchers stick to the homosexual theories, excluding other possibilities.

However, many, especially in the academic world, regard the use of modern labels as problematic, owing to differences in the ways that different societies constructed sexual orientation identities and to the connotations of modern words like queer. Other academics acknowledge that, for example, even in the modern day not all men who have sex with men identify with any of the modern related terms, and that terms for other modern constructed or medicalized identities (such as nationality or disability) are routinely used in anachronistic contexts as mere descriptors or for ease of modern understanding; thus they have no qualms doing the same for sexual orientation. Academic works usually specify which words will be used and in which context. Readers are cautioned to avoid making assumptions about the identity of historical figures based on the use of the terms mentioned above.

=== Ancient Greece ===
Greek men had great latitude in their sexual expression, but their wives were severely restricted and could hardly move about the town unsupervised if she was old enough that people would ask whose mother she was, not whose wife she was.

Men could also seek adolescent boys as partners as shown by some of the earliest documents concerning same-sex pederastic relationships, which come from Ancient Greece. Though slave boys could be bought, free boys had to be courted, and ancient materials suggest that the father also had to consent to the relationship. Such relationships did not replace marriage between man and woman, but occurred before and during the marriage. A mature man would not usually have a mature male mate (though there were exceptions, among whom Alexander the Great); he would be the erastes (lover) to a young eromenos (loved one). Kenneth Dover suggests that it was considered improper for the eromenos to feel desire, as that would not be masculine. Driven by desire and admiration, the erastes would devote himself unselfishly by providing all the education his eromenos required to thrive in society. In recent times, Dover's theory suggests that questioned in light of massive evidence of ancient art and love poetry, a more emotional connection than earlier researchers liked to acknowledge.

=== Ancient Rome ===
The "conquest mentality" of the ancient Romans shaped Roman homosexual practices. In the Roman Republic, a citizen's political liberty was defined in part by the right to preserve his body from physical compulsion or use by others; for the male citizen to submit his body to the giving of pleasure was considered servile. As long as a man played the penetrative role, it was socially acceptable and considered natural for him to have same-sex relations, without a perceived loss of his masculinity or social standing. Sex between male citizens of equal status, including soldiers, was disparaged, and in some circumstances penalized harshly. The bodies of citizen youths were strictly off-limits, and the Lex Scantinia imposed penalties on those who committed a sex crime (stuprum) against a freeborn male minor. Male slaves, prostitutes, and entertainers or others considered infames (of no social standing) were acceptable sex partners for the dominant male citizen to penetrate.

"Homosexual" and "heterosexual" were thus not categories of Roman sexuality, and no words exist in Latin that would precisely translate these concepts. A male citizen who willingly performed oral sex or received anal sex was disparaged. In courtroom and political rhetoric, charges of effeminacy and passive sexual behaviors were directed particularly at "democratic" politicians (populares) such as Julius Caesar and Mark Antony. Until the Roman Empire came under Christian rule, there is only limited evidence of legal penalties against men who were presumably "homosexual" in the modern sense.

== See also ==
- LGBTQ history
