= Rooster (disambiguation) =

A rooster is a male chicken.

Rooster, roosters, or The Rooster(s) may also refer to:

== Places ==
- Rooster River, Connecticut, USA; a river
- Rooster Comb, a ridge in Coe State Park, California, USA
- Rooster Rock State Park, Oregon, USA
- Rooster Bridge, Ljubljana, Slovenia; a footbridge

== Food ==
- Rooster potato, a red-skinned potato with floury yellow flesh
- Rooster olives, a style of olives
- Rooster bowl, a traditional Chinese pottery design
- Rooster's Brewery, a small independent brewery in Knaresborough, North Yorkshire

== Entertainment ==
=== Fictional characters ===
- Rooster Cogburn (character), from the novel True Grit and film adaptations
- Rooster Bennett, from the Netflix show The Ranch
- Daniel "Rooster" Hannigan, from the musical Annie and adaptations

=== Film ===
- Rooster (film), a 1982 American television film
- The Rooster (film), a 2023 Australian film directed by Mark Leonard Winter
- Roosters (film), a 1993 American film

=== Music ===
==== Bands ====
- Rooster (band), British indie rock band, from London, formed in 2003
- The Roosters, Japanese rock band
- The Roosters, or HaTarnegolim, Israeli music group
- The Roosters, 1960s house band at the Cinnamon Cinder club
- The Roosters, an American band headed by Jerry Butler, later changing their name to Jerry Butler & The Impressions
- The Roosters, band of guitarist Eric Clapton before joining the Yardbirds

==== Albums and songs ====
- Rooster (album), a 2005 album by the British band Rooster
- "Rooster" (song), a song by Alice in Chains
- "The Rooster", a song by Outkast from Speakerboxxx/The Love Below
- "Rooster", a 2025 song by Mac DeMarco from Guitar

=== Television ===
- Rooster (TV series), a 2026 comedy series on HBO starring Steve Carell
- "Rooster", a 2005 episode of the animated series 12 oz. Mouse
- Roosters (Millennium), 1998 series episode

== Sports ==
- Rooster 8.1, a special rig for the Laser sailboat
- Rooster Sailing, a sailing wear company

=== Sports teams ===
==== Australian rules ====
- North Adelaide Roosters, an Australian rules football team in the South Australian National Football League (SANFL)
- Des Moines Roosters, an Australian Football team in Iowa, USA
- North Ballarat Roosters, an Australian rules football team in the Victorian Football League

==== Baseball ====
- Port City Roosters, a baseball team in North Carolina, USA
- Richmond Roosters, a baseball team in Richmond, Indiana, USA
- Rochester Roosters, a cross-state baseball team in Wisconsin-Minnesota, USA

==== Rugby league ====
- Altona Roosters, a rugby league team in Victoria, Australia
- Fremantle Roosters, a rugby league club in Fremantle, Australia
- St Ives Roosters, a rugby league team in Cambridgeshire, UK
- Nerang Roosters, a rugby league team in Queensland, Australia
- Sabeto Roosters, a rugby league team in Fiji
- Salford City Roosters, a British rugby league team in Manchester, England, UK
- Saluzzo Roosters, an Italian rugby league team in Saluzzo, Piedmont, Italy
- Sydney Roosters, an Australian rugby league team in the Australian National Rugby League (NRL)
  - Sydney Roosters Juniors
- Te Atatu Roosters, a rugby league team in Te Atatu, New Zealand
- Thirlmere-Tahmoor Roosters, a rugby league team in New South Wales, Australia

==== Other sports ====
- Helsinki Roosters, A Finnish American football team in Helsinki, Finland
- "Rooster", a nickname for, and the mascot of, the Brazilian football club Clube Atlético Mineiro
- Bligh Roosters, a rugby union team in Fiji
- Bremen Roosters, a basketball team in Bremen, Germany
- Iserlohn Roosters, an ice hockey club in Iserlohn, Germany

== Other uses ==
- Rooster (application), a mobile reading service for iOS7
- Rooster (zodiac), the Chinese zodiac symbol
- Rooster Men, a VietCong nickname for soldiers in the 101st Airborne Division
- Operation Rooster 53, Israeli military operation

== See also ==
- Rooster tail, a spray tail of water
- El Gallo (disambiguation) (Spanish for "the rooster")
- Red Rooster (disambiguation)
- Rooster Flag (disambiguation)
- Roster (disambiguation)
