= Club Sesso =

Sex club in Portland, Oregon, U.S.

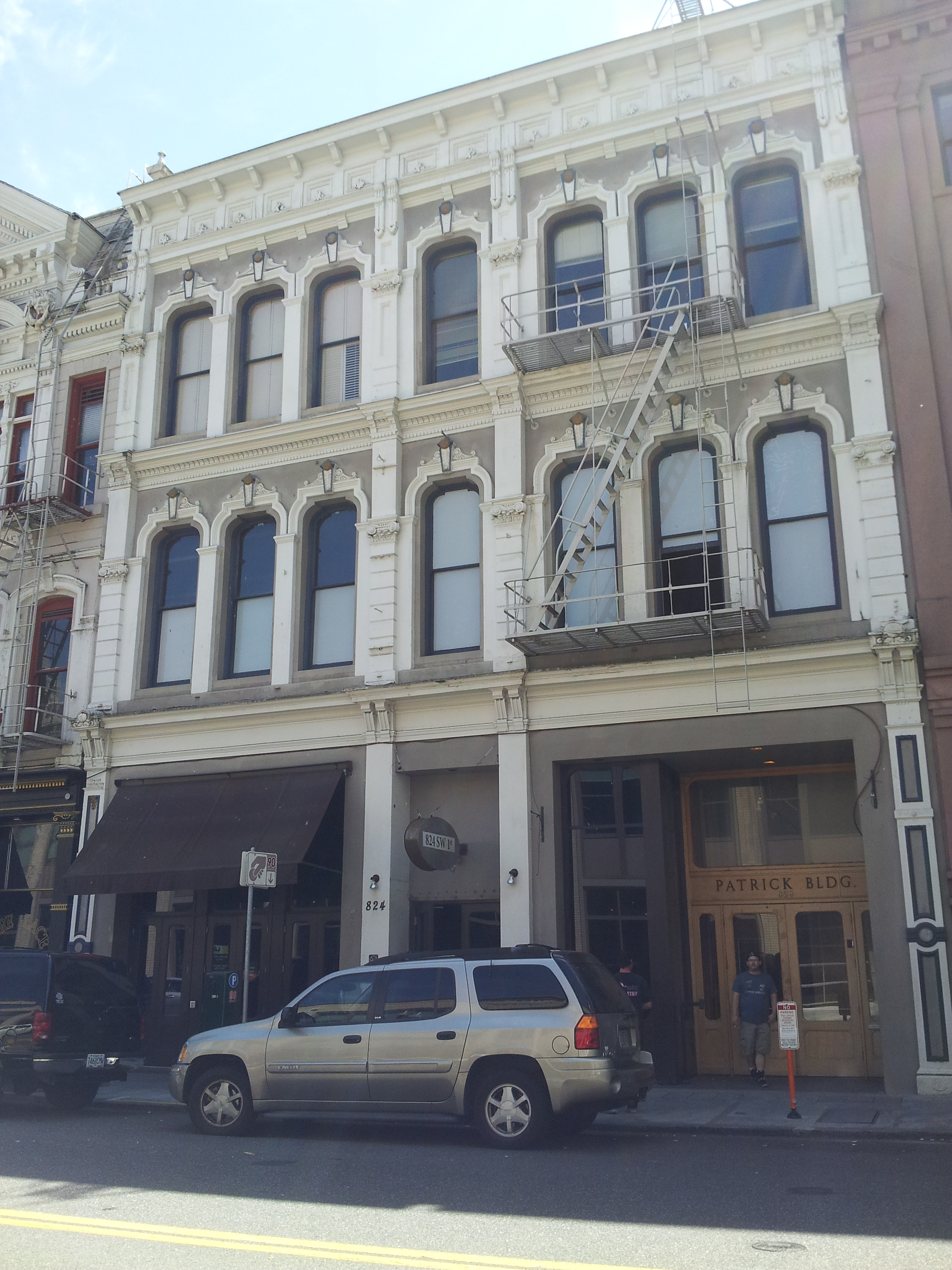
- The exterior of the building which housed Club Sesso, in June 2015, shortly after closing
- Interactive map of Club Sesso
- Full name: Ron Jeremy's Club Sesso
- Address: 824 Southwest 1st Avenue
- Location: Portland, Oregon, U.S.
- Coordinates: 45.5167°N 122.6740°W

Construction
- Opened: June 19, 2009
- Closed: June 20, 2015

Club Sesso, officially known as Ron Jeremy's Club Sesso, was a sex club for swingers that operated in Portland, Oregon from 2009 to 2015.

== Description and history ==
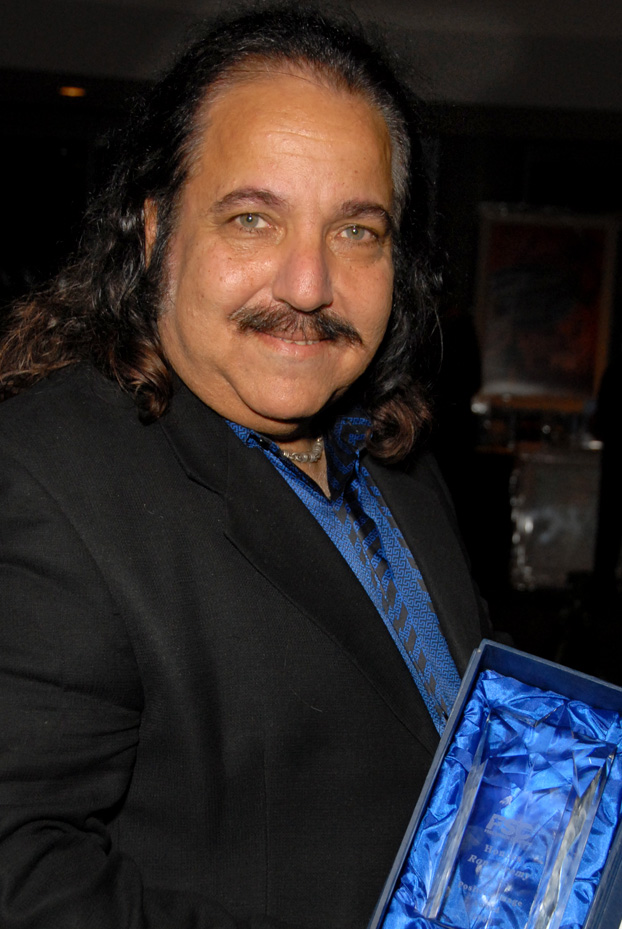
The club was endorsed by Ron Jeremy (pictured in 2009).

Club Sesso opened at 824 Southwest 1st Avenue in downtown Portland on June 19, 2009. The club was endorsed by American pornographic film actor Ron Jeremy and billed as an "upscale, high-energy swingers club" where members could engage in sexual activities.

In June 2014, Portland Fire and Rescue denied a permit to the club due to its incomplete renovation. On June 28, while Club Sesso was hosting an anniversary party, a fire inspector determined that the business was in violation of city code. However, fire marshal Doug Jones, who was not on duty that evening, intervened and overruled the inspector's ruling, saying "that there would be no repercussions from the Fire Bureau as a result of the lack of permits".

In June 2015, owner Paul Smith announced that Club Sesso was closing due to legal fees, which reached nearly $100,000. He said of the club's closure, "Unfortunately, due to circumstances beyond our control, and the continual and substantial nonlitigation legal fees during the past year, and our inability to reach reasonable agreements with the various government agencies involved, Club Sesso is no longer able to stay in business. Saturday June 20th will be our last event... Six years and one day after we opened." The club's last day of operations was June 20, 2015. According to Smith, lawyers are "evaluating all options in reopening" the club in the future.

In September 2016, the club reopened under new ownership with the name Club Privata.

== See also ==
- Plato's Retreat (1977–1985), a swingers' club in New York City
- Sex clubs in Portland, Oregon
- Vegas Red Rooster, a swingers' club in Whitney, Nevada
