= Giovanni Rota =

Giovanni Rota may refer to:

- Giovanni Rota (luthier) (1767-before 1829), Italian luthier
- Nino Rota (1911 – 1979), Italian composer, pianist, conductor

== See also ==
- Rota (surname)
