= Red Rooster (disambiguation) =

Red Rooster is an Australian fast food chain.

Red Rooster may also refer to:

== People ==
- Terry Taylor, professional wrestler known as the Red Rooster

== Food ==
- Red Rooster (drink), an energy drink in the U.S. and the U.K.
- Red Rooster hot sauce
- Red Rooster, a Marcus Samuelsson restaurant in Harlem

== Music ==
- Red Rooster Records, a record label
- "Little Red Rooster", a blues standard written by Willie Dixon

=== Bands ===
- Red Rooster (band), a band formed in 1998
- The Red Roosters (band), a Los Angeles, California-based band from 1965 who featured some members of what would later be Spirit
- The Red Roosters, a blues/rock band from Osijek, Croatia formed in the summer of 2003
- The Red Roosters, a rock & roll band from Milan, Italy formed in 2010
- Red Roosters, a rock & roll and rockabilly band from Győr, Hungary formed in 2017

== Sports ==
- Charleroi Red Roosters, an ice hockey team in Charleroi, Belgium
- Red Rooster Racing, a motorsports company of India

== Other uses ==
- Red Rooster (video game), a role-playing video game similar to Disco Elysium
- Red Rooster Group, a New York-based marketing agency
- Red Rooster Nite Club, a 1931 era Las Vegas Nightclub located where The Mirage now stands
- Vegas Red Rooster a Las Vegas Swingers club established in 1982
- Pelagia and the Red Rooster, a Russian mystery novel

== See also ==
- Rooster (disambiguation)
- Red (disambiguation)
- Rhode Island Red, a breed of roosters
