= Rotta =

Rotta may refer to:

- Rotta, Germany, a small village in Saxony-Anhalt
- La Rotta, Pontedera, a village in Tuscany, Italy
- Rotta, Netherlands, an early and high medieval settlement on the Rotte river and the predecessor of the current Dutch city of Rotterdam
- Rotta (composition), a 16th and 17th century music composition for brass instruments
- Rotte (lyre), a musical instrument (lyre) of 6th-century Germany includes variations including rotta, rotte, rota, rote
- Rotte, musical instrument (psaltery), circa 1000-1400 A.D., transcribed various ways including rotta, rota, rotte, rote
- Rotta the Huttlet, a character in the animated film Star Wars: The Clone Wars
- Chapati, also roti or rotta, a type of flatbread found in India

== People with the surname ==
- Amilcare Rotta (1911–1981), Italian bobsledder
- Angelo Rotta (1872–1965) Italian prelate of the Catholic Church
- Antonio Rotta (1828-1903), Italian painter
- Notkea Rotta, Finnish rapper
- René Rotta (1928–2007), French racing cyclist
- Rudy Rotta (1950—2017), Swiss-Italian blues guitarist and vocalist

== See also ==
- Rota (disambiguation)
