= Rota =

Rota or ROTA may refer to:

== Places ==
- Rota, Northern Mariana Islands, an island and municipality
- Rota (volcano), in Nicaragua
- Rota, Spain, a town in Andalusia
- Naval Station Rota, Spain

== People ==
- Rota (surname), a surname (including a list of people with the name)
- Rota Waitoa (died 1866), New Zealand Anglican clergyman

== Arts, entertainment, and media ==
- Rota (poem), once proposed to be the national anthem of Poland
- Rota, a collection of poems by A. W. Yrjänä
- Rota, a type of round (music)
- Rota, Rotta, Rotte, Rote, a medieval musical instrument resembling a harp
- Crwth also called Rote, a medieval bowed lyre

== Organizations ==
- Rota (formation), an infantry or cavalry unit
- Reach Out To Asia, a non-governmental organization based in Qatar
- Roman Rota, the highest appellate tribunal of the Catholic Church
- Rondas Ostensivas Tobias de Aguiar, a military police force in São Paulo
- Rota Club, a 1659–1660 London debate society
- Royal Rota, the press pool for the British Royal Family

== Other uses ==
- Rota (architecture), a rotating cylinder built into a wall, used for exchanging mail and food with cloistered clergy
- Rota (genus), an extinct sea cucumber; see List of prehistoric sea cucumbers
- Rota (papal signature), a sign which makes up part of the pope's signature
- Róta, a Valkyrie in Norse mythology
- Rota, a term for a schedule (workplace), a list of employees who are working on any given day, week, or month
- Rota, a lion presented to Winston Churchill in 1943
- Rota, the feminine form of the Chilean term roto (literally "broken"), used to refer contemptuously to poor city-dwellers in Chile
- Return on total assets, a financial ratio; See Return on assets
- Rota Fortunae, a concept in medieval and ancient philosophy
- Rota system, a system of collateral succession
- The Rota, the collection of golf courses that host The Open Championship
- U+100CF 𐃏 LINEAR B IDEOGRAM B243 WHEEL , a Linear B ideogram

== See also ==
- Rotary International, a service club
- Rotavirus, the most common cause of severe diarrhoea among infants and young children
- Roster (disambiguation)
- Rotta (disambiguation)
