= Active roster =

Active roster may refer to:

- Active roster (baseball), a list of available Major League Baseball (MLB) players
- 53-man roster, of the National Football League (NFL)

== See also ==
- Major League Baseball rosters
- Minor League Baseball rosters
- Roster (disambiguation)
