= Papal bull =

Type of decree by the Catholic pope

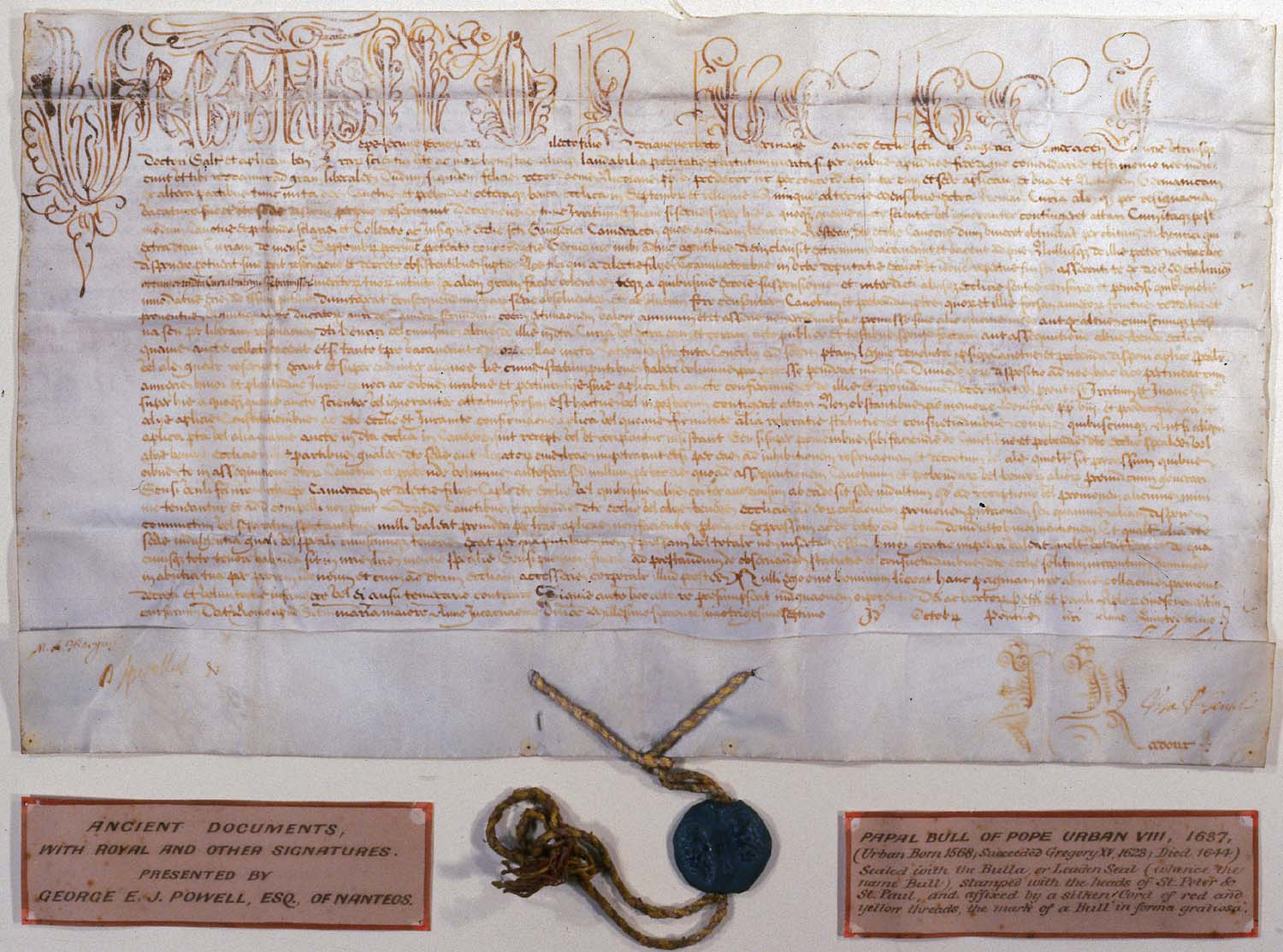
A papal bull of Pope Urban VIII, 1637, sealed with a lead bulla

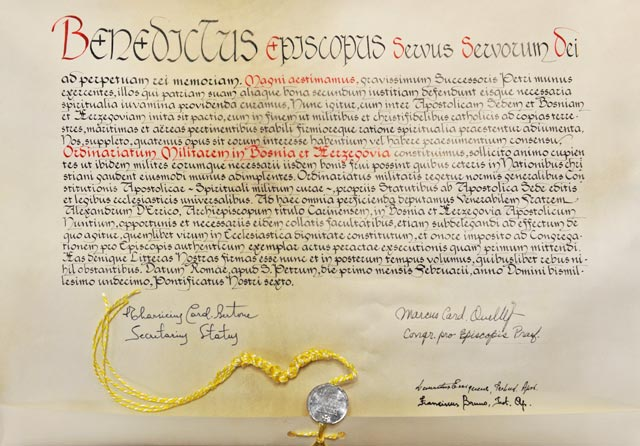
The apostolic constitution Magni aestimamus issued as a papal bull by Pope Benedict XVI in 2011 which instituted the Military Ordinariate of Bosnia and Herzegovina

A papal bull is a type of public decree, letters patent, or charter issued by the pope of the Catholic Church. It is named after the leaden seal (bulla) traditionally appended to authenticate it, and has nothing to do with the adult male cattle.

== History ==
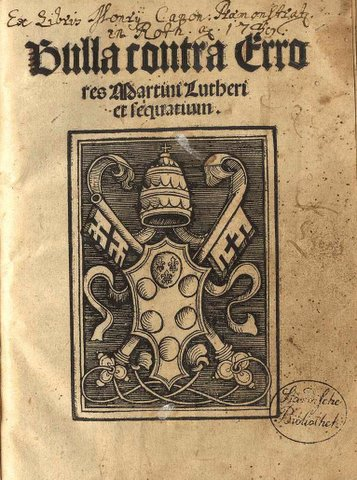
Printed text of Pope Leo X's Exsurge Domine, issued in June 1520. The Latin printed text reads: Bulla contra Errores Martini Lutheri et sequacium (lit. 'Bull against the errors of Martin Luther and his followers')

Papal bulls have been in use at least since the 6th century, but the phrase was not used until around the end of the 13th century, and then only internally for unofficial administrative purposes. However, it had become official by the 15th century, when one of the offices of the Apostolic Chancery was named the "register of bulls" ("registrum bullarum").

By the accession of Pope Leo IX in 1048, a clear distinction developed between two classes of bulls of greater and less solemnity. The majority of the "great bulls" now in existence are in the nature of confirmations of property or charters of protection accorded to monasteries and religious institutions. In an era when there was much fabrication of such documents, those who procured bulls from Rome wished to ensure that the authenticity of their bull was above suspicion. A papal confirmation, under certain conditions, could be pleaded as itself constituting sufficient evidence of title in cases where the original deed had been lost or destroyed.

Since the 12th century, papal bulls have carried a leaden seal with the heads of the apostles Saint Peter and Saint Paul on one side and the pope's name on the other. Papal bulls were originally issued by the pope for many kinds of communication of a public nature, but by the 13th century, papal bulls were only used for the most formal or solemn of occasions. Papyrus seems to have been used almost uniformly as the material for these documents until the early years of the eleventh century, after which it was rapidly superseded by a rough kind of parchment.

Modern scholars have retroactively used the word "bull" to describe any elaborate papal document issued in the form of a decree or privilege, solemn or simple, and to some less elaborate ones issued in the form of a letter. Popularly, the name is used for any papal document that contains a metal seal.

Today, the bull is the only written communication in which the pope will refer to himself as "Episcopus Servus Servorum Dei" ("Bishop, Servant of the Servants of God").

While papal bulls used to always bear a metal seal, they now do so only on the most solemn occasions. A papal bull is today the most formal type of public decree or letters patent issued by the Vatican Chancery in the name of the pope.

== Format ==
A bull's format formerly began with one line in tall, elongated letters containing three elements: the pope's name, the papal title "Episcopus Servus Servorum Dei" ("Bishop, Servant of the Servants of God"), and its incipit, i.e., the first few Latin words from which the bull took its title for record-keeping purposes, but which might not be directly indicative of the bull's purpose.

The body of the text was often very simple in layout, and it had no specific conventions for its formatting. The closing section consisted of a short "datum" that mentioned the place of issuance, day of the month and year of the pope's pontificate on which issued, and signatures, near which was attached the seal.

For the most solemn bulls, the pope signed the document himself, in which case he used the formula "Ego N. Catholicae Ecclesiae Episcopus" ("I, N., Bishop of the Catholic Church"). Following the signature in this case would be an elaborate monogram, the signatures of any witnesses, and then the seal. In modern times, a member of the Roman Curia signs the document on behalf of the pope, usually the Cardinal Secretary of State, and thus the monogram is omitted.

== Seal ==
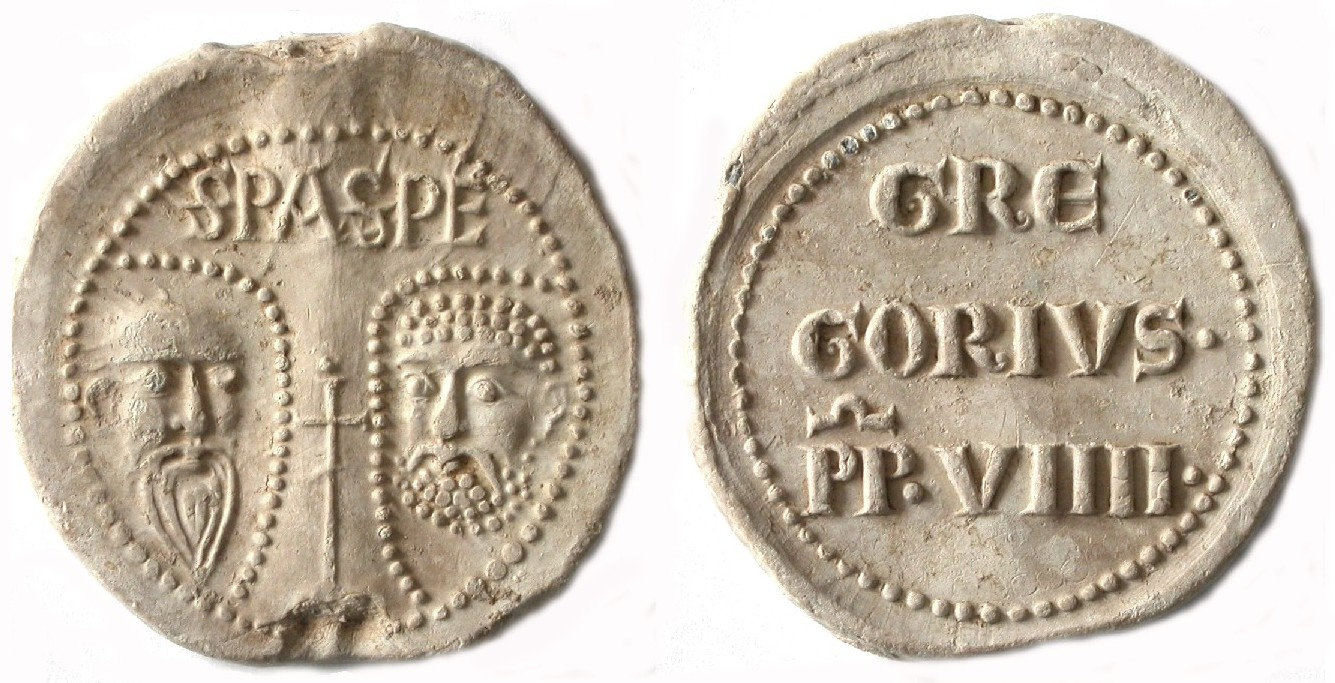
A lead bulla (obverse and reverse) of Gregory IX, pope 1227 to 1241

The most distinctive characteristic of a bull was the metal seal (bulla), which was usually made of lead, but on very solemn occasions was made of gold, as those on Byzantine imperial instruments often were (see Golden Bull). On the obverse it depicted, originally somewhat crudely, the early Fathers of the Church of Rome, the apostles Saint Peter and Saint Paul, identified by the letters SPA•SPE or SPASPE, standing for "Sanctus Paulus" and "Sanctus Petrus". St. Paul, on the left, was shown with flowing hair and a long pointed beard composed of curved lines. St. Peter, on the right, was shown with curly hair and a shorter beard made of dome-shaped globetti (beads in relief). Each head was surrounded by a circle of globetti, and the rim of the seal was surrounded by an additional ring of such beads, while the heads themselves were separated by a depiction of a cross.

On the reverse was the name of the issuing pope in the nominative Latin form, with the letters "PP", for Pastor Pastorum ("Shepherd of Shepherds"), or PAPA ('Pope'), and the Pope's regnal number. This disc was then attached to the document either by cords of hemp, in the case of letters of justice and executory letters, or by red and yellow silk, in the case of letters of grace, that was looped through slits in the vellum of the document. The term "bulla" derives from the Latin "bullire" ("to boil"), and alludes to the fact that, whether of wax, lead, or gold, the material making the seal had to be melted to soften it for impression.

In 1535, the Florentine engraver Benvenuto Cellini was paid 50 scudi to recreate the metal matrix which would be used to impress the lead bullae of Pope Paul III. Cellini retained definitive iconographic items like the faces of the two apostles, but he carved them with a much greater attention to detail and artistic sensibility than had previously been in evidence. On the reverse of the seal he added several fleurs-de-lis, a heraldic device of the Farnese family, from which Pope Paul III descended.

Since the late 18th century, the lead bulla has been replaced with a red ink stamp of Saints Peter and Paul with the reigning pope's name encircling the picture, though very formal letters, e.g. the bull of Pope John XXIII convoking the Second Vatican Council, still receive the leaden seal.

Original papal bulls exist in quantity only after the 11th century onward, when the transition from fragile papyrus to the more durable parchment was made. None survives in entirety from before 819. Some original lead bullae still survive from as early as the 6th century.

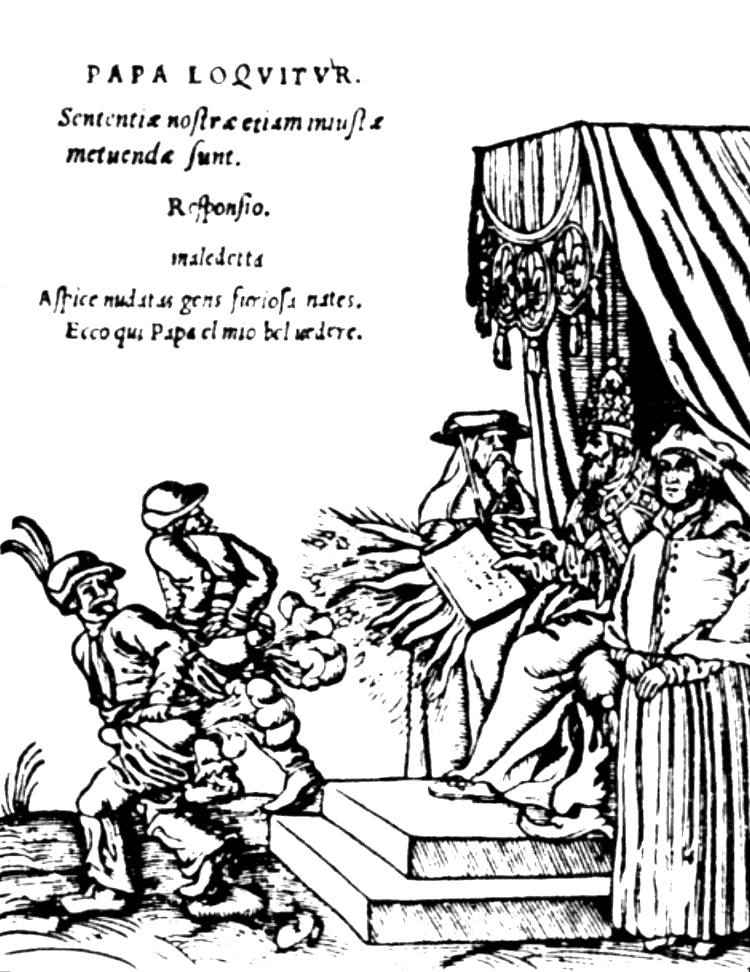
From a series of 1545 woodcuts usually referred to as the Papstspotbilder or Papstspottbilder, by Lucas Cranach, commissioned by Martin Luther. "Kissing the Pope's feet"; German peasants respond to a papal bull of Pope Paul III. The caption reads: "Don't frighten us Pope, with your ban, and don't be such a furious man. Otherwise we shall turn around and show you our rears".

== Content ==
In terms of content, the bull is simply the format in which a decree of the pope appears. Any subject may be treated in a bull, and many were and are, including statutory decrees, episcopal appointments, dispensations, excommunications, apostolic constitutions, canonizations, and convocations.

The bull was the exclusive letter format from the Vatican until the 14th century, when the papal brief appeared. The brief is the less formal form of papal communication and was authenticated with a wax impression, now a red ink impression, of the Ring of the Fisherman.

== See also ==
- Abbreviator
- Bull of the Crusade
- Canonical coronation
- Edict
- Encyclical
- Fatwa
- Golden bull
- Heirloom Seal of the Realm
- Great Seal of the Realm
- Letters patent
- Papal brief
- Proclamation
- Rota (papal signature)
