= Sex clubs in Portland, Oregon =

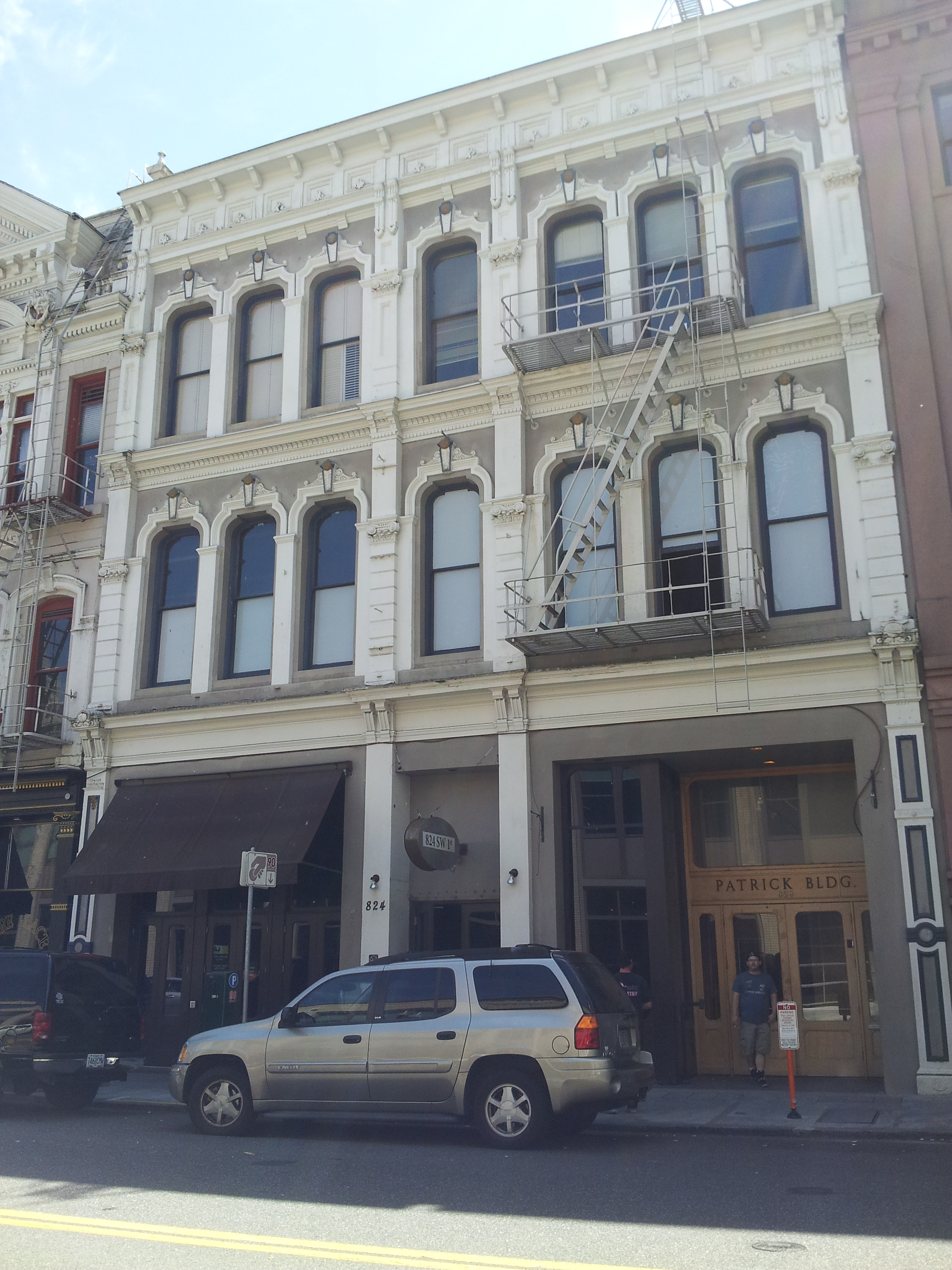
Exterior of the building which houses Club Privata in the same space previously occupied by Ron Jeremy's Club Sesso (2009–2015)

Many sex clubs have operated in Portland, Oregon, United States. Businesses have included, BDSM dungeons, gay bathhouses, and swingers' clubs.

== Establishments ==
Catalyst is a dungeon.

Gay bathhouses have included Hawks PDX and Steam Portland. Club Portland closed in 2007.

Swingers' clubs include Club Privata, Sanctuary, and Velvet Rope. Club Sesso operated from 2009 to 2015.

In 2015, Willamette Week described the Paris Theatre as "an adult movie theater, sex club and safe space for public masturbators".

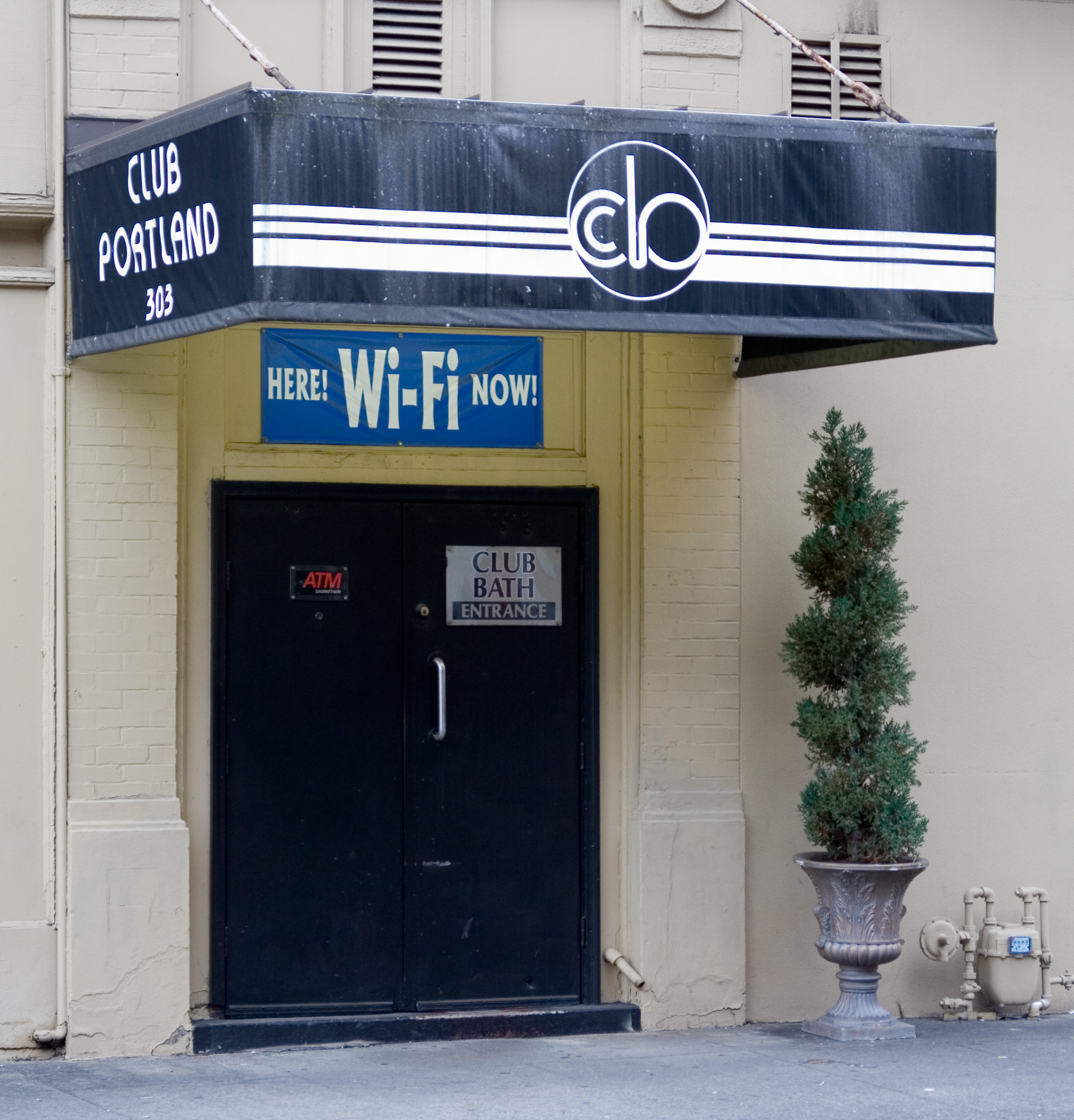
Club Portland, 2006

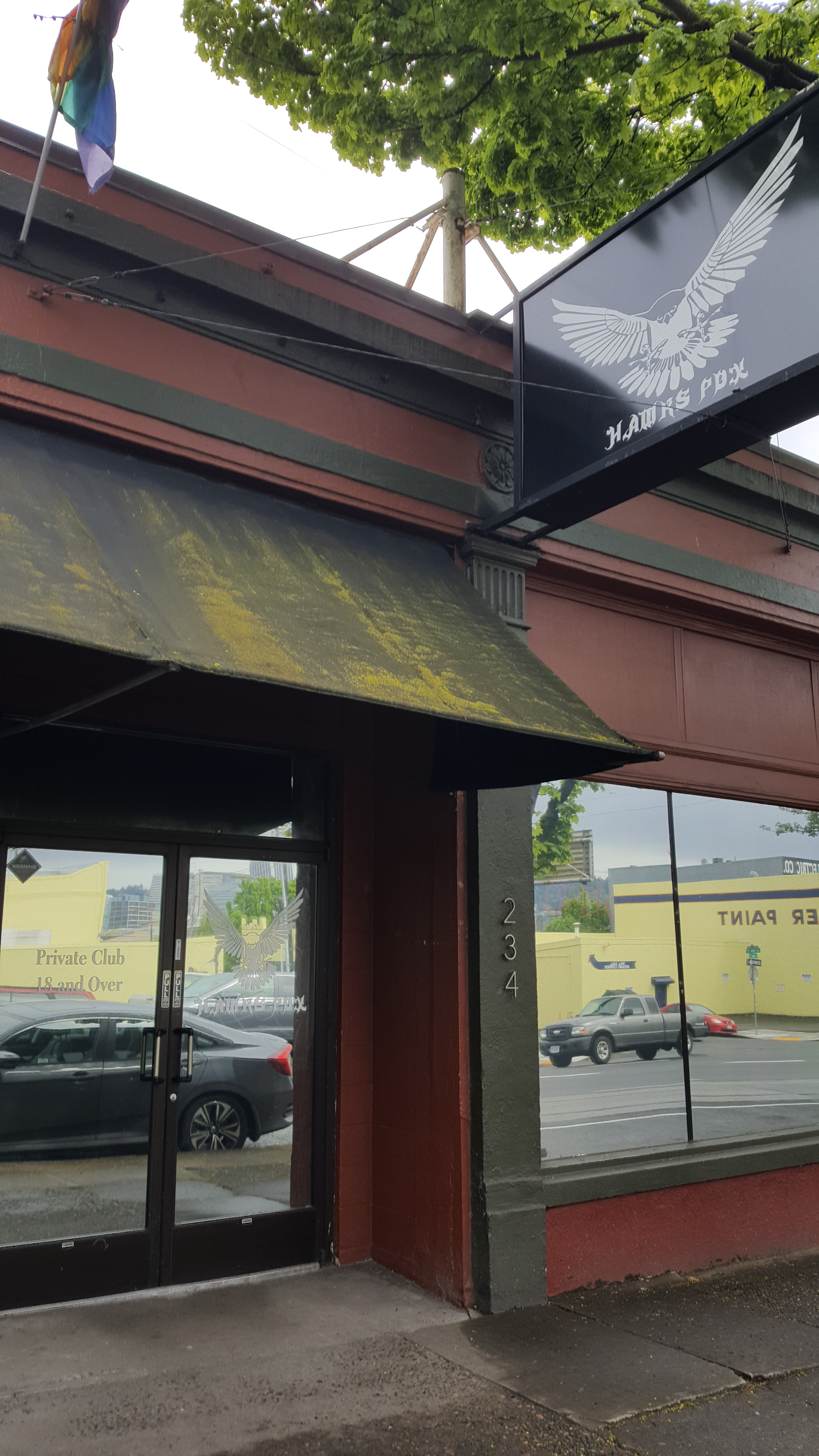
Hawks PDX, 2017

== See also ==
- Culture of Portland, Oregon
