= Club Portland =

Defunct gay bathhouse in Portland, Oregon, U.S.

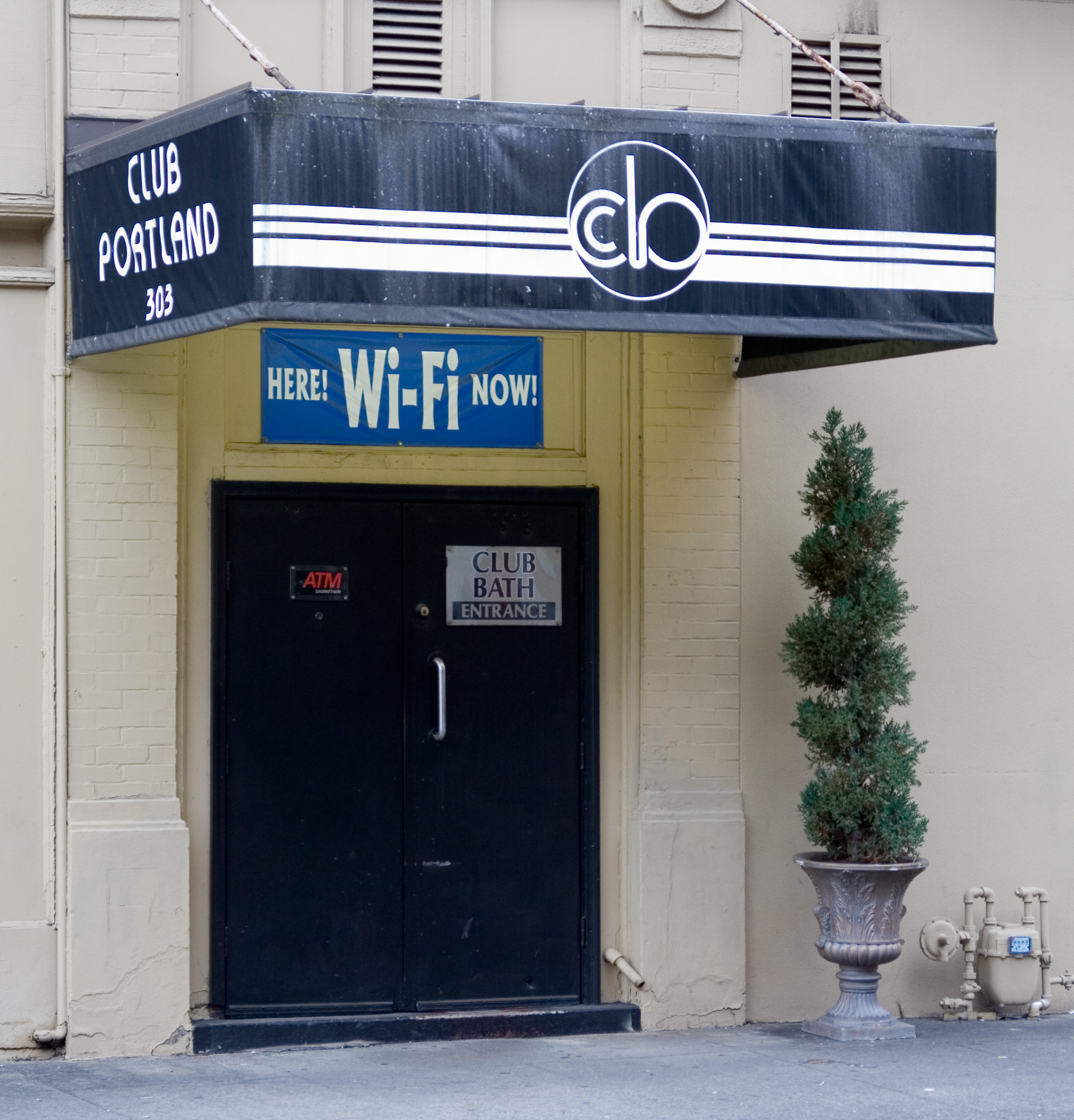
- The club's entrance in 2006

- Location in Portland, Oregon
- Former names: Club Baths
- Address: 303 Southwest 12th Avenue
- Location: Portland, Oregon, United States
- Coordinates: 45.52281°N 122.68330°W
- Type: Gay bathhouse

Construction
- Opened: 1971; 55 years ago
- Closed: 2007; 19 years ago

Club Portland, previously known as Club Baths or Continental Club Baths, was a gay bathhouse in Portland, Oregon, United States. In its place now is the Crystal Hotel by McMenamins.

== Description ==
Located at Southwest 12th Avenue, the business operated 24 hours per day, 365 days of the year. Before closing on June 17, 2007, Club Portland was believed to be the largest bathhouse on the West Coast of the United States and was regarded as a "Stark Street icon of sorts". Writing for Just Out, Stephen Marc Beaudoin describe the final moments of the club as a place that "had become something of a Stark Street eyesore in its waning years".

== History ==
Sources disagree on the opening year. The Portland Mercury and the official McMenamins hotel website have said the business operated as Club Baths in 1971, and later became known as Club Portland. The club's official website mentioned "Continental Club Baths" and "since 1967", as of April 2001. Willamette Week has said the club was established by Richard Lawson in 1987.

According to Willamette Week, the club was "often blamed by public health officials and other community leaders as partly responsible for new waves of HIV and STD infections, though those accusations were near-impossible to prove". Just Out magazine and a McMenamins marketing director toured the shuttered club guided by a construction supervisor for the project. After the club closed, construction crew found a file cabinet full of membership and employee records.

when the bathhouse called it quits, leaving highly private records—containing members’ and employees’ full contact information and, sometimes, copies of their driver’s licenses, Social Security cards and other identification—vulnerable to theft and duplication.

Additionally, the guide told them his crew found 100–150 hypodermic needles. When Just Out reached out to the club's former owner and inquired about the records, the magazine says Dick Lawson claimed, "There is nothing that remains of the bath records at this time." McMenamins retained the records and when Lawson was advised of this, he responded, "That's history. The building was sold a year and a half ago, and I will not comment further."

== See also ==
- LGBTQ culture in Portland, Oregon
- Sex clubs in Portland, Oregon
