= Hawks PDX =

Gay bathhouse in Portland, Oregon, U.S.

- Logo

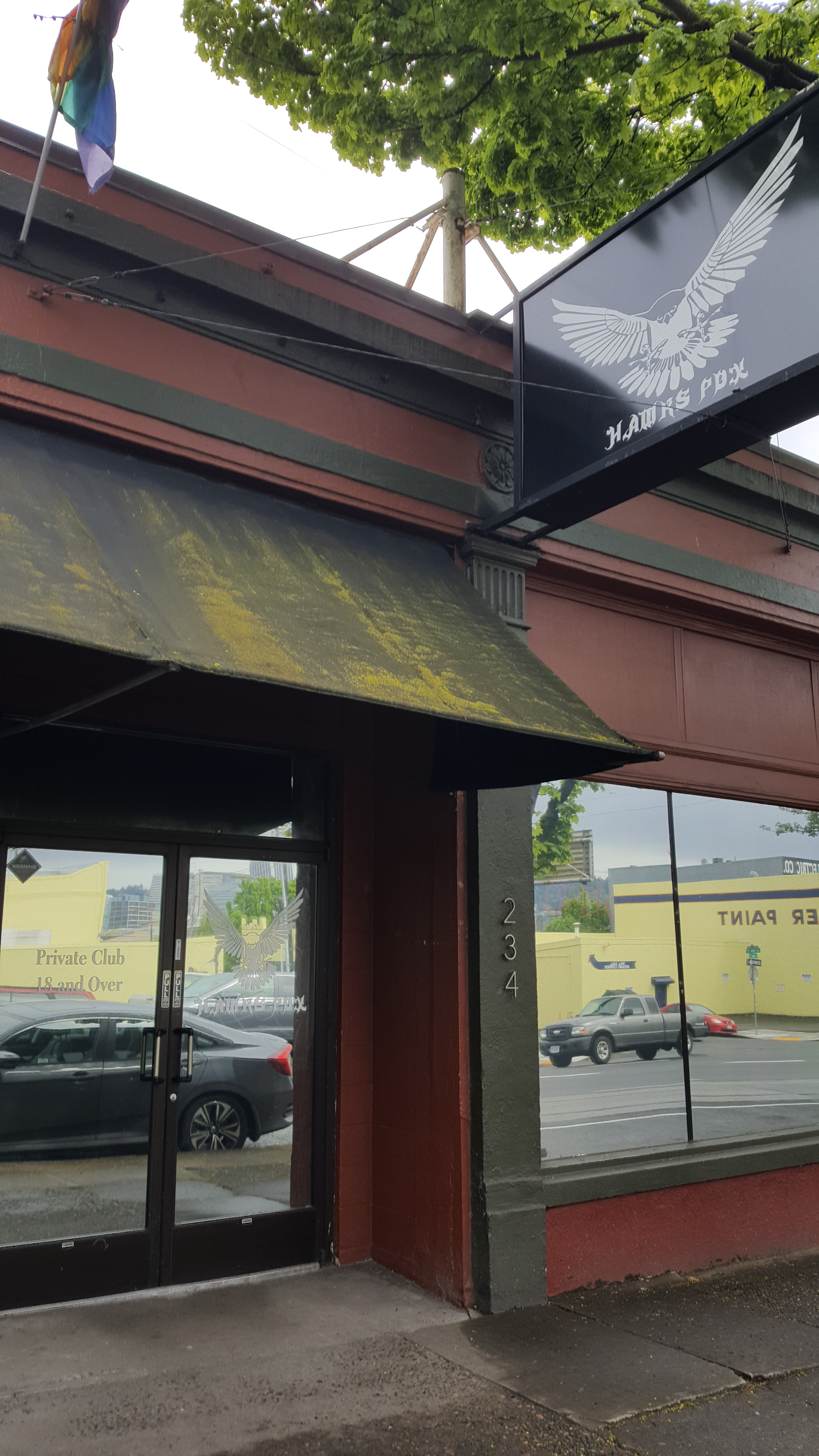
- Exterior entrance of the former location in the Buckman neighborhood, 2017

- Location in Portland, Oregon
- Address: 335 Southeast 99th Avenue; Portland; United States
- Location: Portland, Oregon, United States
- Coordinates: 45.5203°N 122.5626°W
- Type: Gay bathhouse

Website
- hawkspdx.com

Hawks PDX is a gay bathhouse located in Portland, Oregon's Hazelwood neighborhood, in the United States. Previously, the business operated in southeast Portland's Buckman neighborhood.

== Description and history ==
Hawks PDX is a gay bathhouse in the southeast Portland part of the Hazelwood neighborhood. Previously, the business operated in the Buckman neighborhood.

Hawks PDX hosted an anniversary celebration event in April 2013. The bathhouse has hosted bear nights and gender-fluid nights. In 2013, PQ Monthly was informed by Hawks' manager that membership is open to all male-identified people. Writing for Willamette Week, contributor Jack Rushall described Hawks as "Grindr IRL" (a real life version of Grindr), and "the dive bar bathhouse that feels much more like you're at somebody's house than an upscale gym". Hawks PDX is one of only two bathhouses in Portland, as of 2018.

Hawks closed temporarily during the COVID-19 pandemic. The club's website said, "Our landlord did not give us any rent concessions through the pandemic and the amount of rent due through July was just too much. This, combined with the pandemic closure, pointed to permanently shutting down the SE Grand location." Hawks announced plans to re-open near Mall 205 in 2022 and as of 2024 is open in that location.

== See also ==
- Sex clubs in Portland, Oregon
