= Steam Portland =

Gay bathhouse in Portland, Oregon, U.S.

- Logo

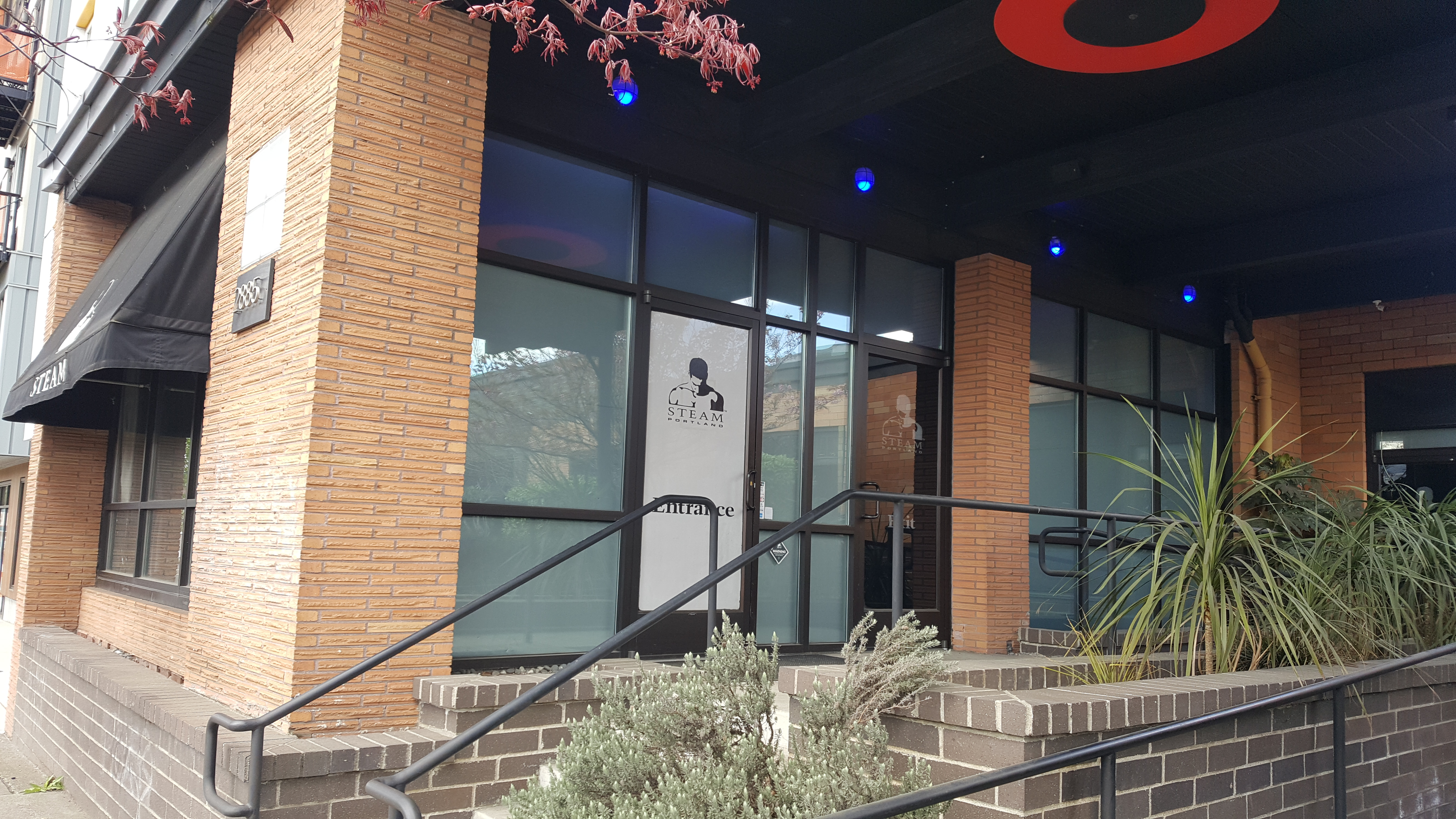
- Front entrance, 2022

- Location in Portland, Oregon
- Address: 2885 Northeast Sandy Boulevard
- Location: Portland, Oregon, United States
- Coordinates: 45.53003°N 122.63572°W
- Type: Gay bathhouse

Construction
- Opened: 2003

Website
- www.steamportland.com

Steam Portland is a gay bathhouse located in the Kerns neighborhood of northeast Portland, Oregon, United States.

== Description and history ==
According to Portland Monthly, Steam Portland allows trans men and nonbinary people "if they legally identify as male or X" on identity documents. The bathhouse opened in 2003 and has been called "sleek". Amenities include a nude sun deck, a hot tub and steam bath, a lounge, and video booths.

The privately owned bathhouse was among the first businesses in Portland to close temporarily because of the COVID-19 pandemic.

== See also ==
- Sex clubs in Portland, Oregon
