= Rotta (composition) =

Rotta is a 16th and 17th century music composition for brass instruments that consists of sections of irregular music phrases in which the rhythmic activity gradually dissipates. These compositions were played directly after a trumpet ensemble sonata, and eventually the components of this composition were merged into sonata form at which point the rotta disappeared from the repertoire.
