= Tughra =

Calligraphic monogram, seal or signature of a sultan

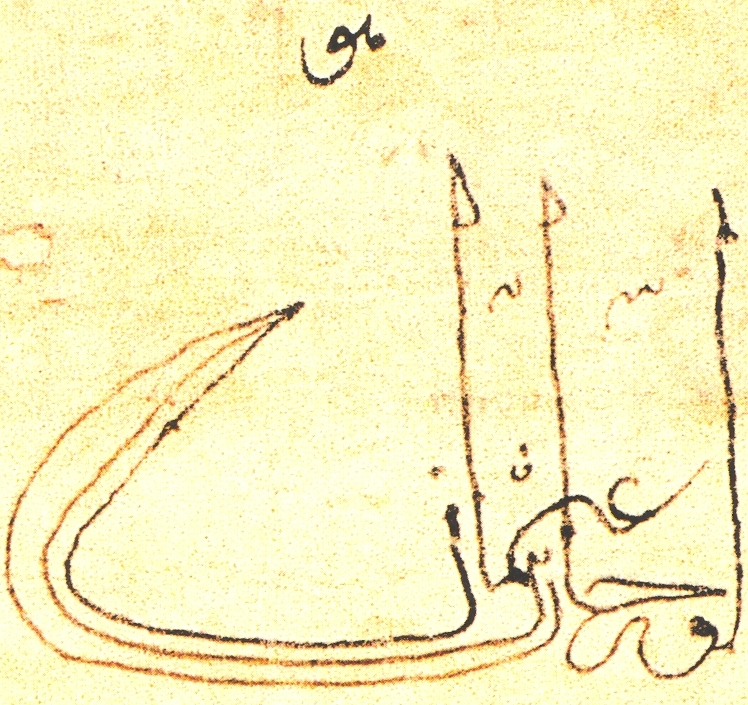
The first Ottoman tughra, Orhan (1326).

One of the earliest known tughras in Iran, on a Persian firman issued in 1233 CE by a local Turkic ruler named Muhammad b. Usman b. Uzbak.

A tughra (Ottoman Turkish: طغرا, romanized: ṭuġrā; Turkish: tuğra) is a calligraphic monogram, seal or signature of a sultan that was affixed to all official documents and correspondence. Inspired by the tamgha, it was also carved on his seal and stamped on the coins minted during his reign. Very elaborate decorated versions were created for important documents that were also works of art in the tradition of Ottoman illumination, such as the example of Suleiman the Magnificent in the gallery below.

The tughra was designed at the beginning of the sultan's reign and drawn by the court calligrapher or nişancı on written documents. The first tughra examples are from the 14th century.

Tughras served a purpose similar to the cartouche in ancient Egypt or the royal cypher of British monarchs. Every Ottoman sultan had his own individual tughra.

== Etymology ==
There are two main schools of thought on the origins of the word tughra. The first sees it derived from a Turkic secretarial emblem called tughragh, and the second as an effort by Persian scribes to shape the name of the ruler into a bow-like element called turgha/turghay, subsequently mispronounced as tughra.

The primary argument for the first school is a remark by Mahmud al-Kashgari in his Dīwān Lughāt al-Turk:

The tughragh is the seal and signature of the king [in] Oghuz dialect and not known to [Western] Turks; I do not know its origin.

== Visual elements of a tughra ==
The tughra of Sultan Mahmud II of the Ottoman Empire. It reads in Arabic "Mahmud Khan son of Abdülhamid, forever victorious". Written out: محمود خان بن عبد الحميد مظفر دائماً (Mahmūd Ḫān bin Abdulhamīd muẓaffer dāʾimā).

The tughra has a characteristic form, two loops on the left side, three vertical lines in the middle, stacked writing on the bottom and two extensions to the right. Each of these elements has a specific meaning, and together they make up the form that is easily recognizable as a tughra.

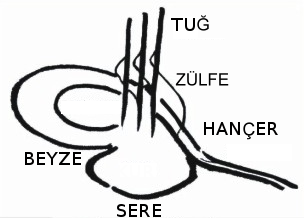
Visual Elements of a Tughra

The name of the sultan is written out in the bottom section, called a sere. Depending on the period, this name can be as simple as Orhan, son of Osman, in the first tughra in 1326. In later periods honorifics and prayers are also added to the name of the tughra holder and his father.

The loops to the left of the tughra are called beyze, from Arabic meaning egg. Some interpretations of tughra design claim that the beyzes are supposed to symbolize the two seas the sultans held sway over: the outer larger loop signifying the Mediterranean and the inner, smaller loop signifying the Black Sea.

The vertical lines on the top of the tughra are called tuğ, or flagstaff. The three tugs signify independence. The S-shaped lines crossing the tugs are called zülfe and they, together with the tops of the tugs that also look to the right, signify that the winds blow from the east to the west, the traditional movement of the Ottomans.

The lines to the right of the tughra are called hançer and signify a sword, symbol of power and might.

== Tughras of the Ottoman sultans ==
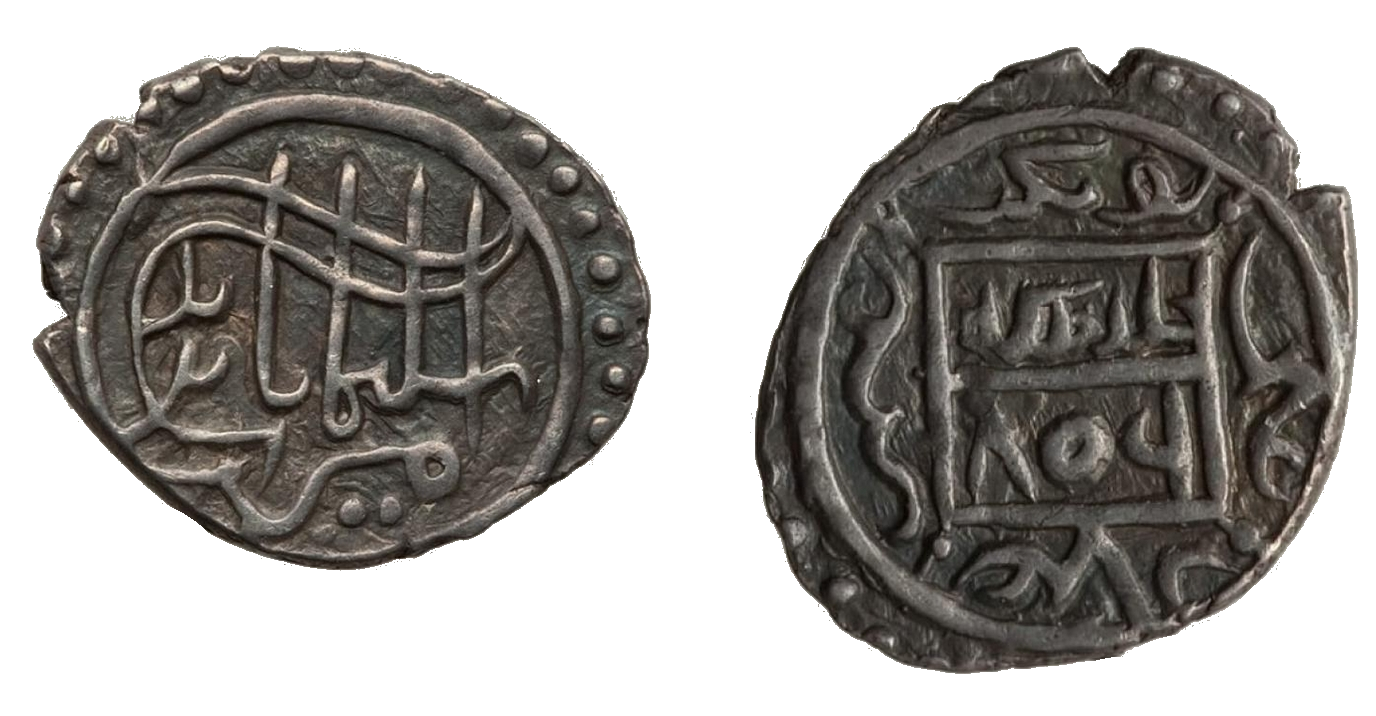
1404 AD dated akçe minted by Süleyman Çelebi. The first Ottoman coin bearing a tughra (on the obverse reading as follows: "Emir Süleyman son of Bayezid")

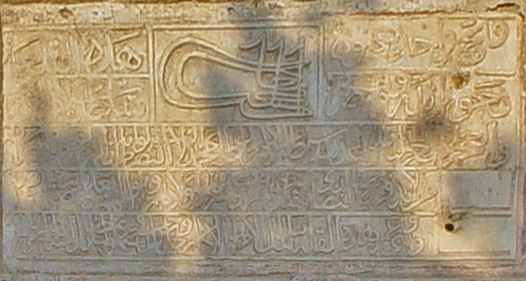
Tughra of Murad II at the Heptapyrgion in Thessaloniki (1431)

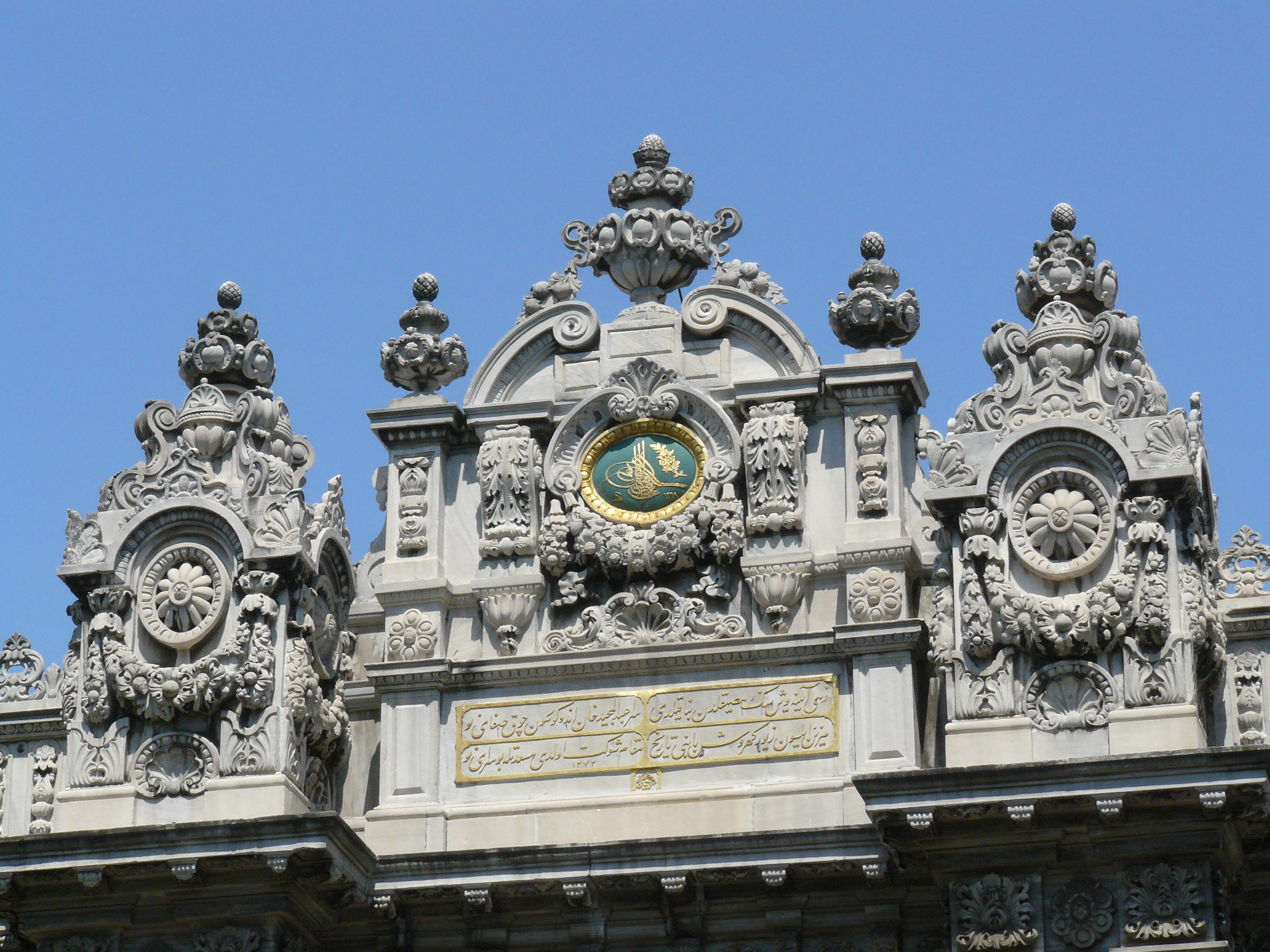
The Tughra at Dolmabahçe Palace.

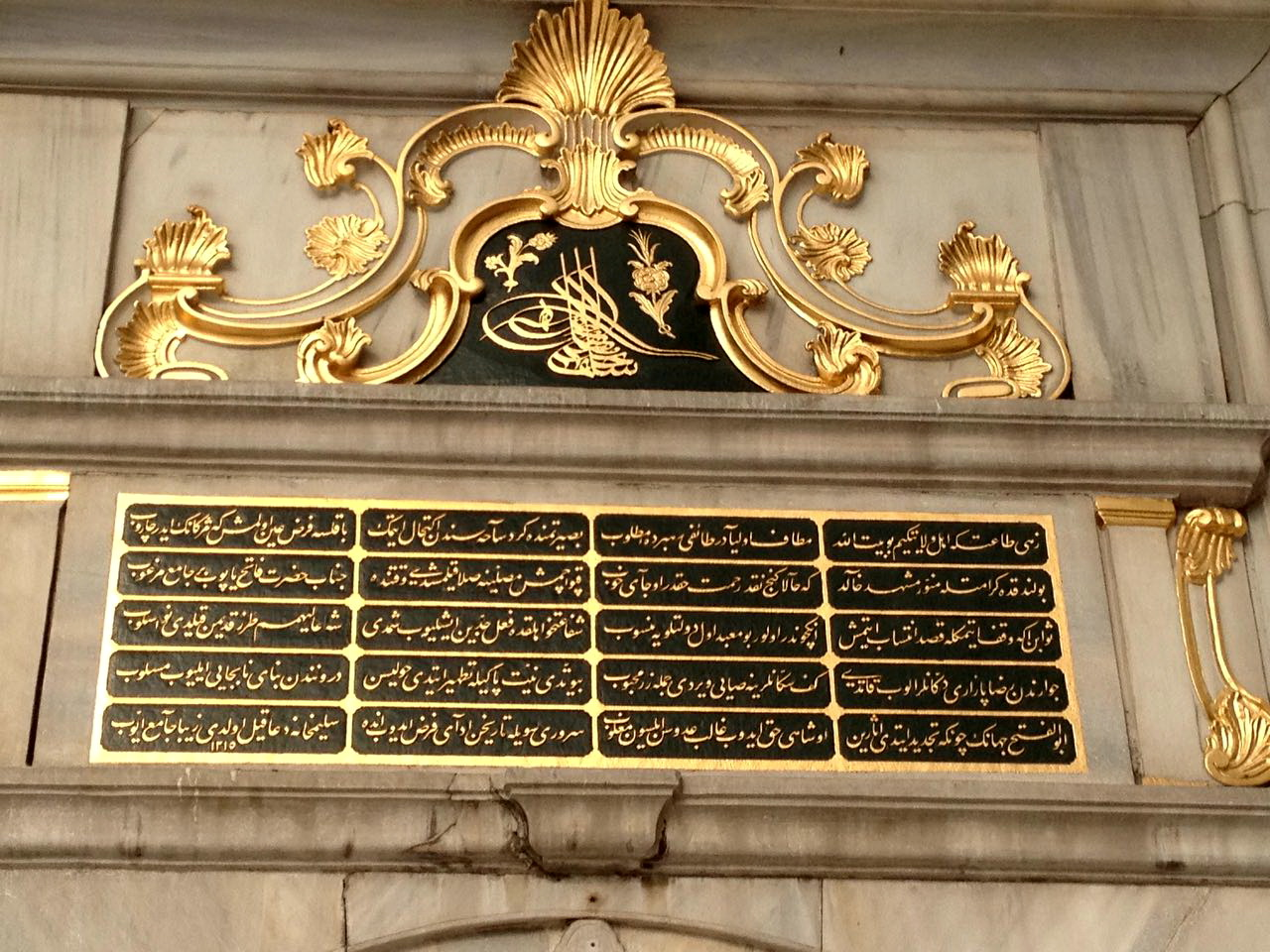

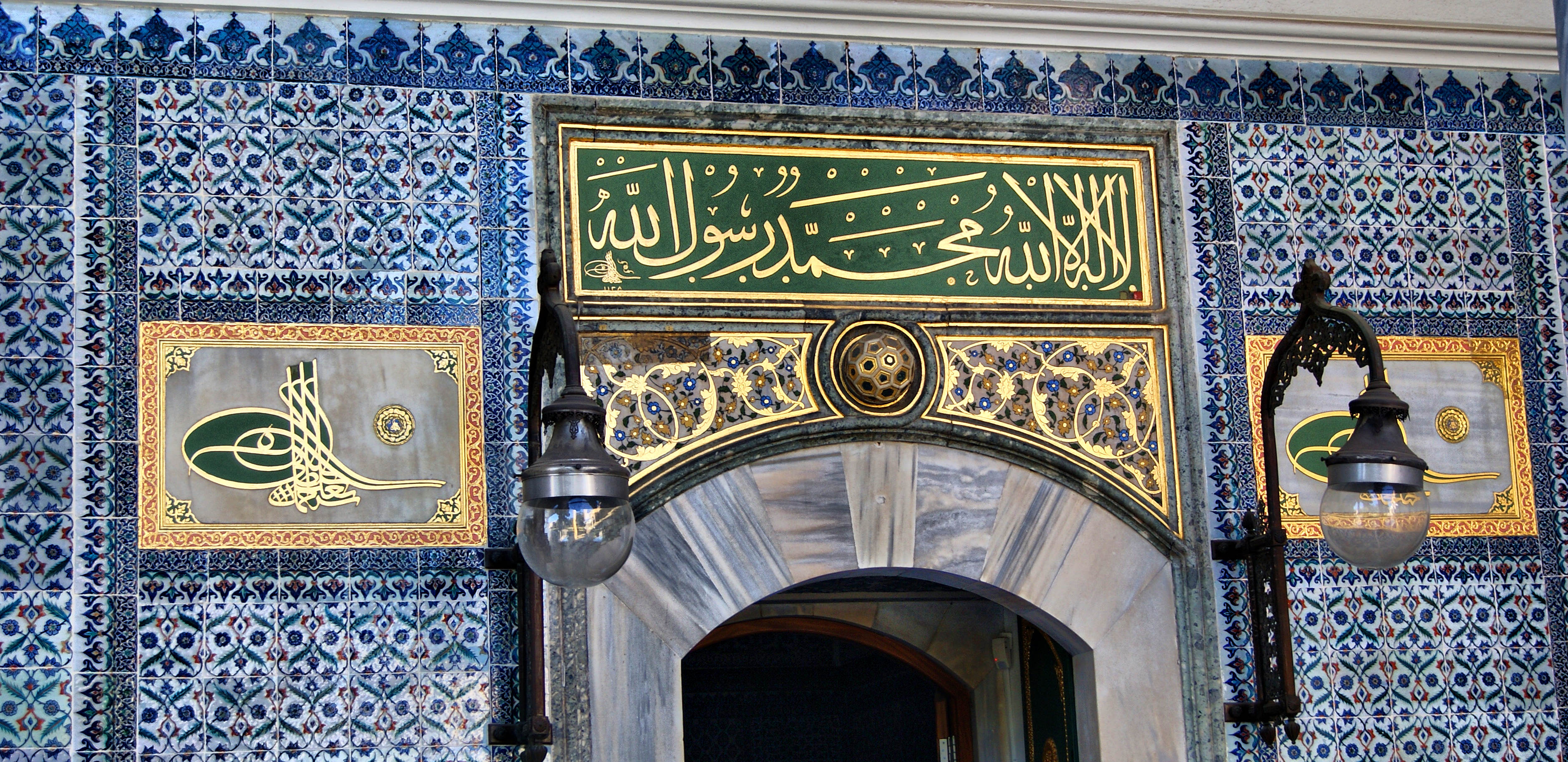

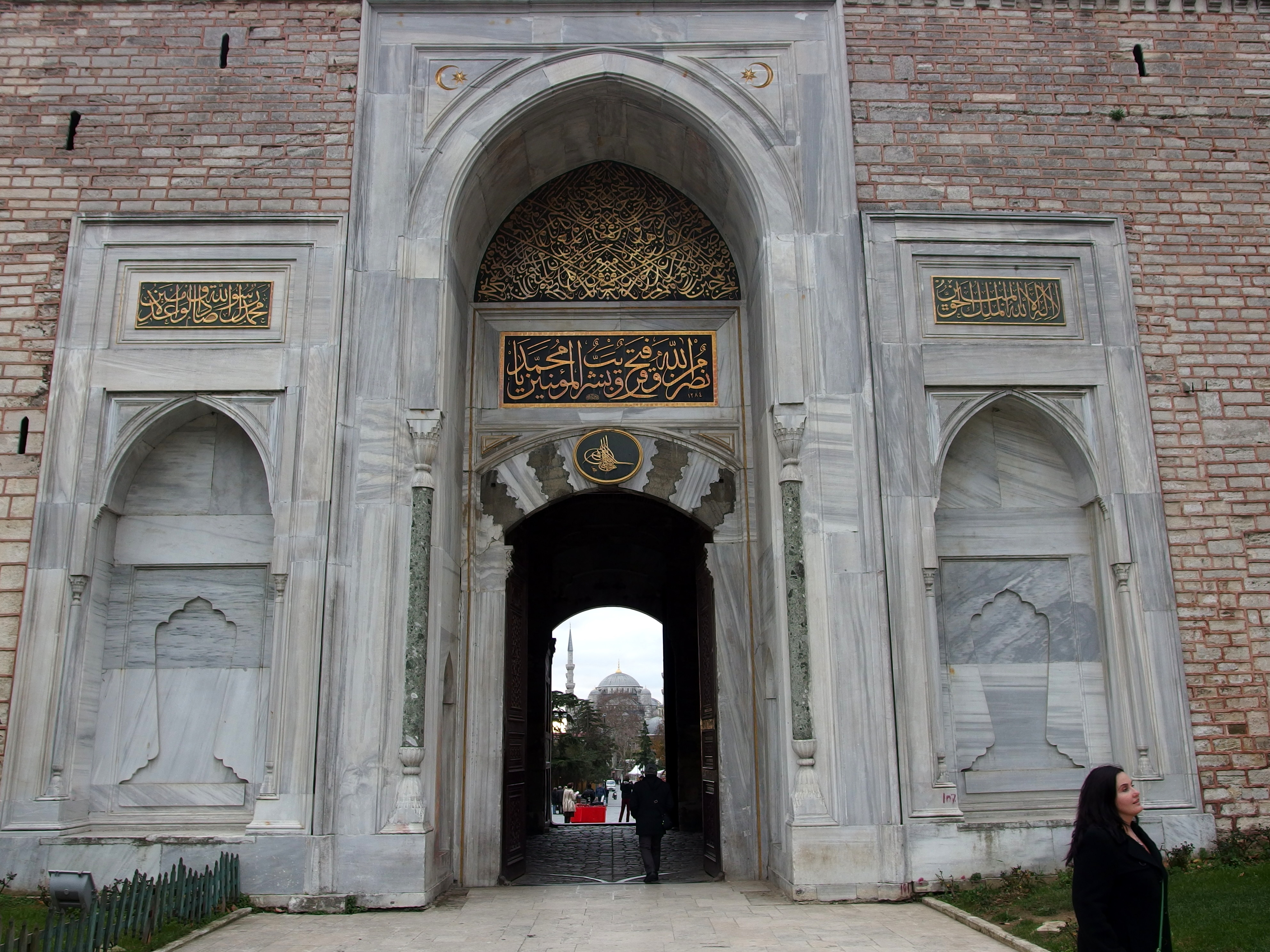

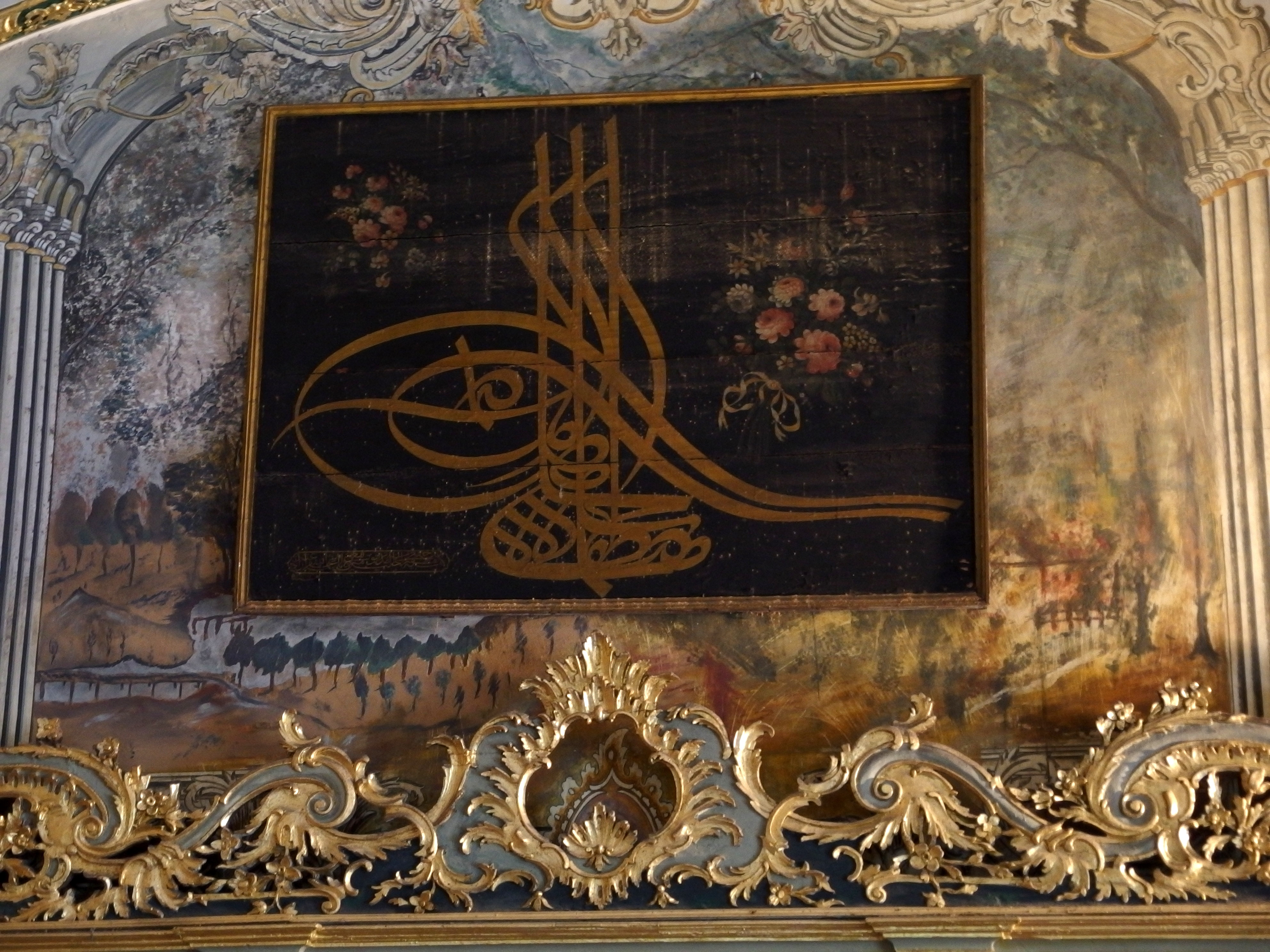

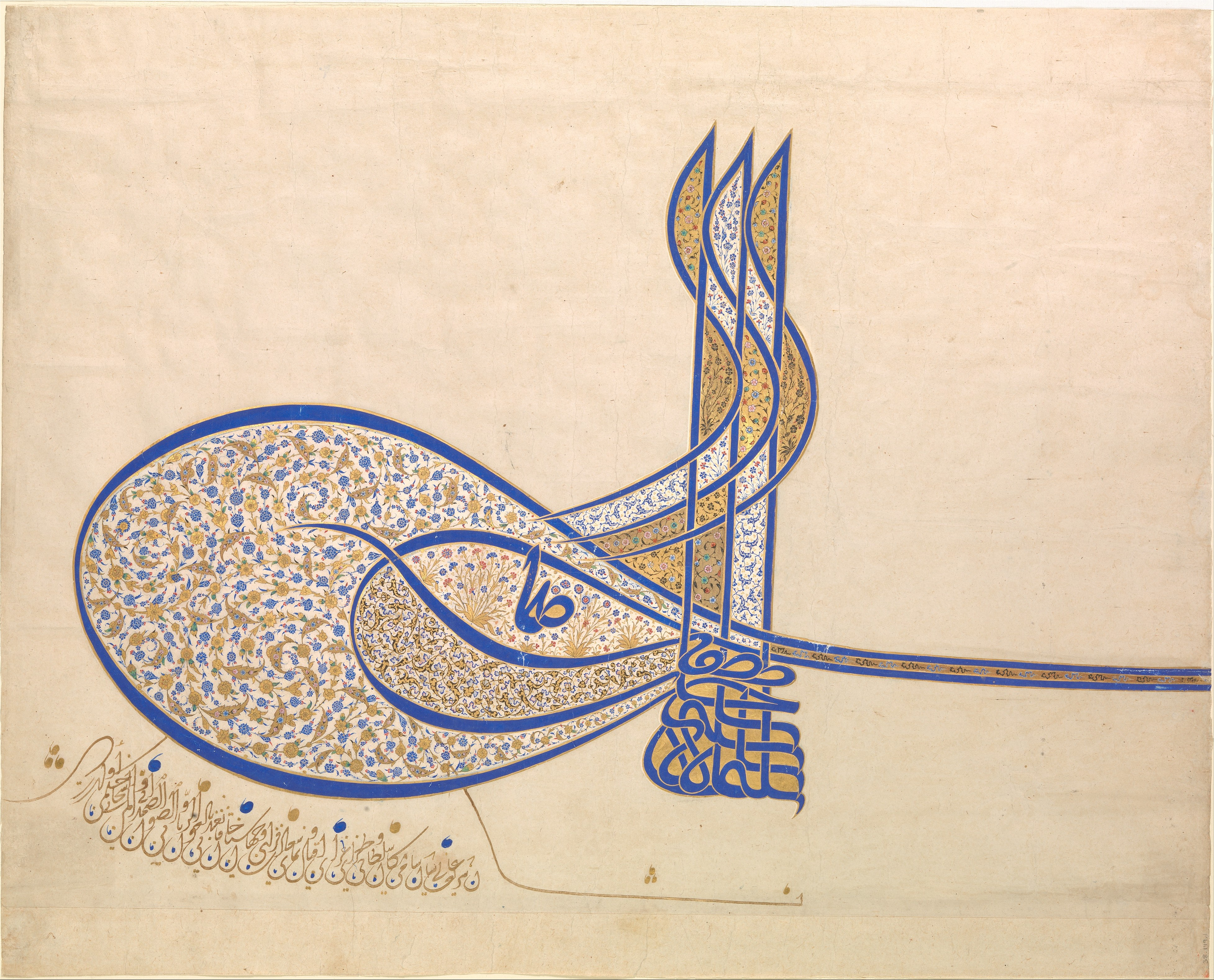
Decorated tughra of Süleyman the Magnificent (1520)

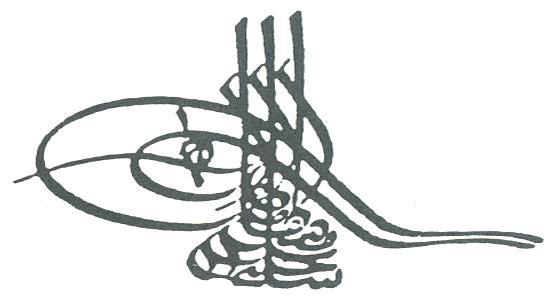
Tughra of Selim III (1789)

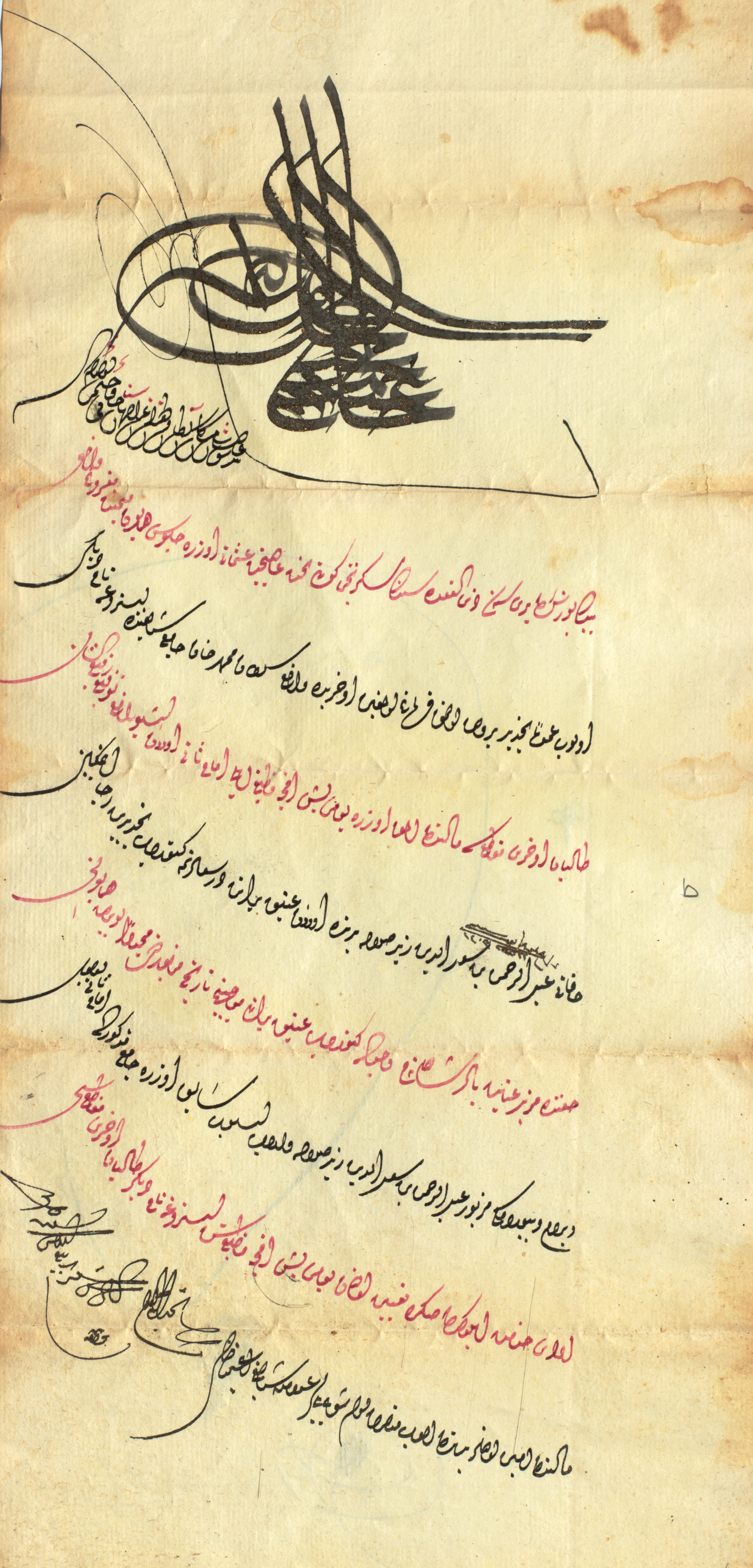

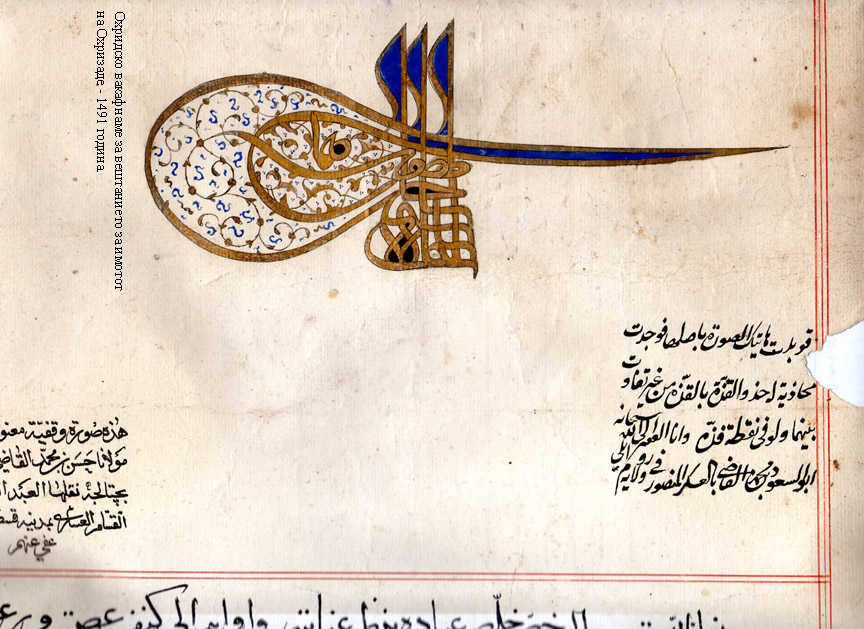

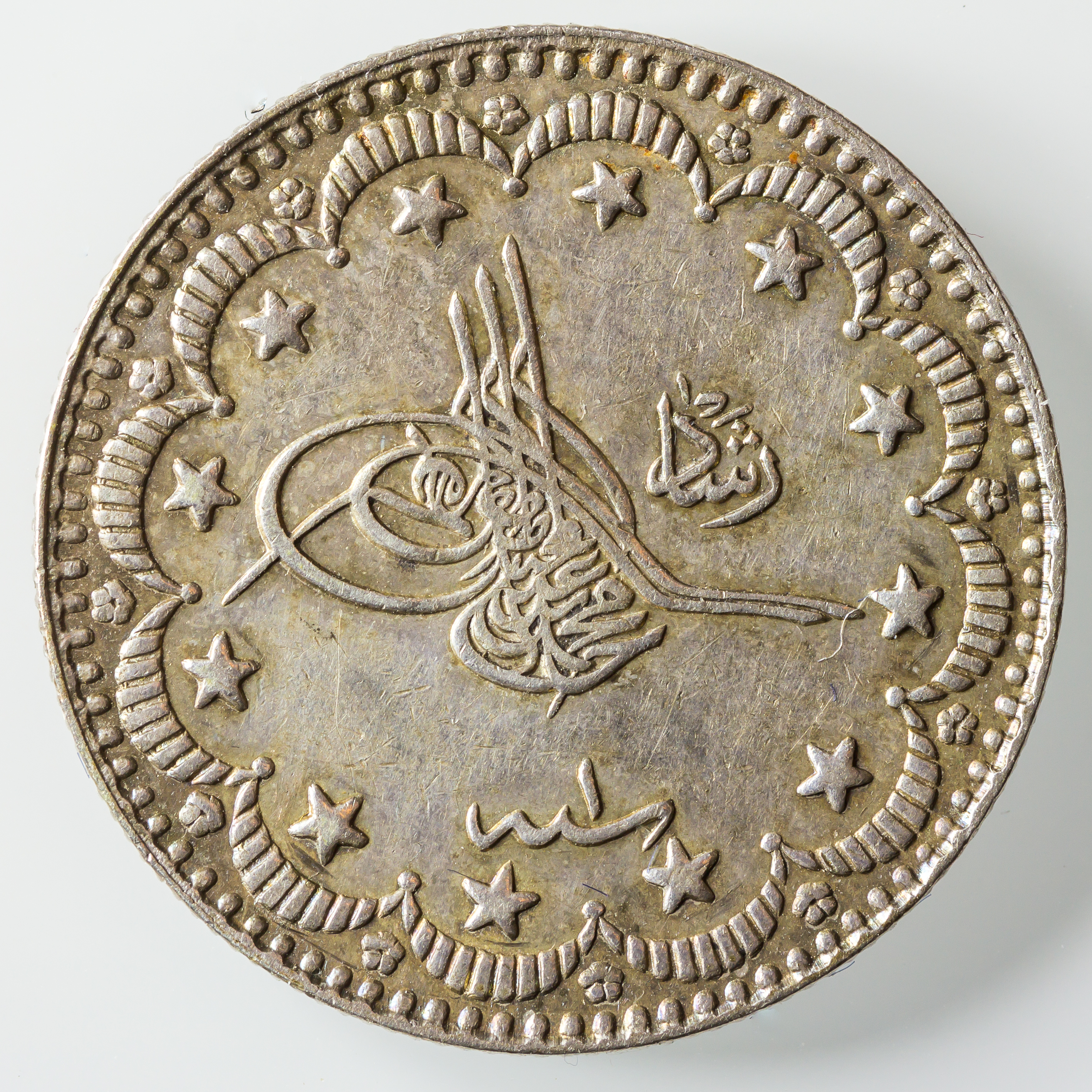

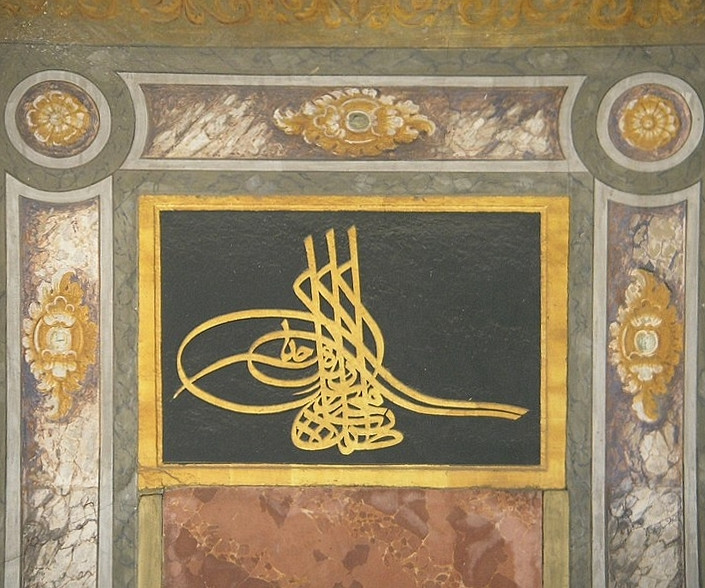
Tughra on the Gate of Felicity at Topkapı Palace

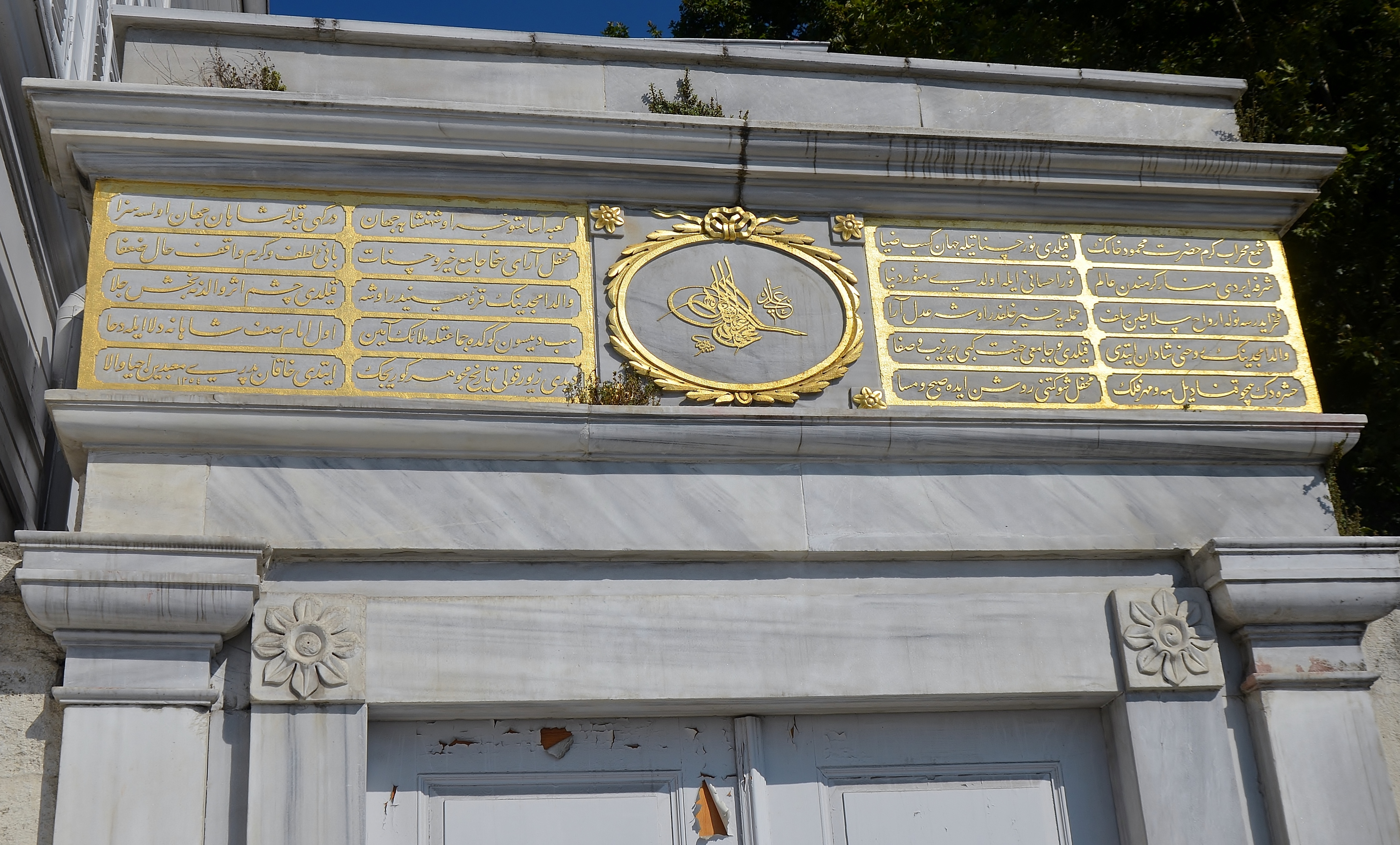

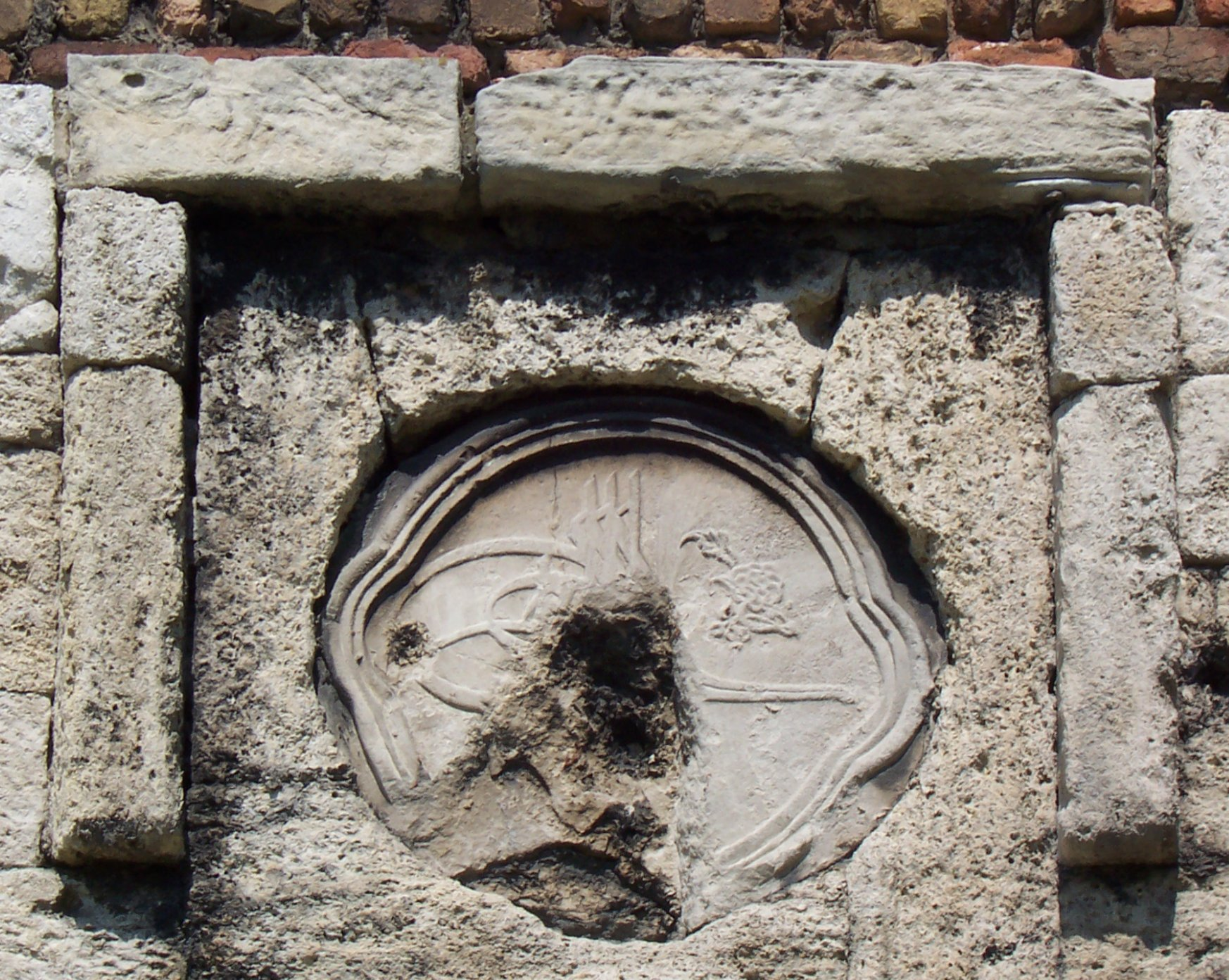
Tughra above Port Gate in Belgrade

== Other tughras ==
Although the tughra is largely identified with the Ottoman Sultans, they have also sometimes been used in other states, such as Qajar Iran, the Safavid Empire, the Crimean khanate, the Khanate of Kazan. Later, tughras were used among the Tartary in the Russian Empire. The Mughal "Tughra" was circular in shape.

Afghan currency notes from 1919 to 1936 had the tughra present as well. Pakistan had the tughra on its coins from 1947 till 1974; both of these are present in the State Bank Museum in Karachi. The nawab of Bahawalpur and the Nizam of Hyderabad had tughras on their coinage as well.

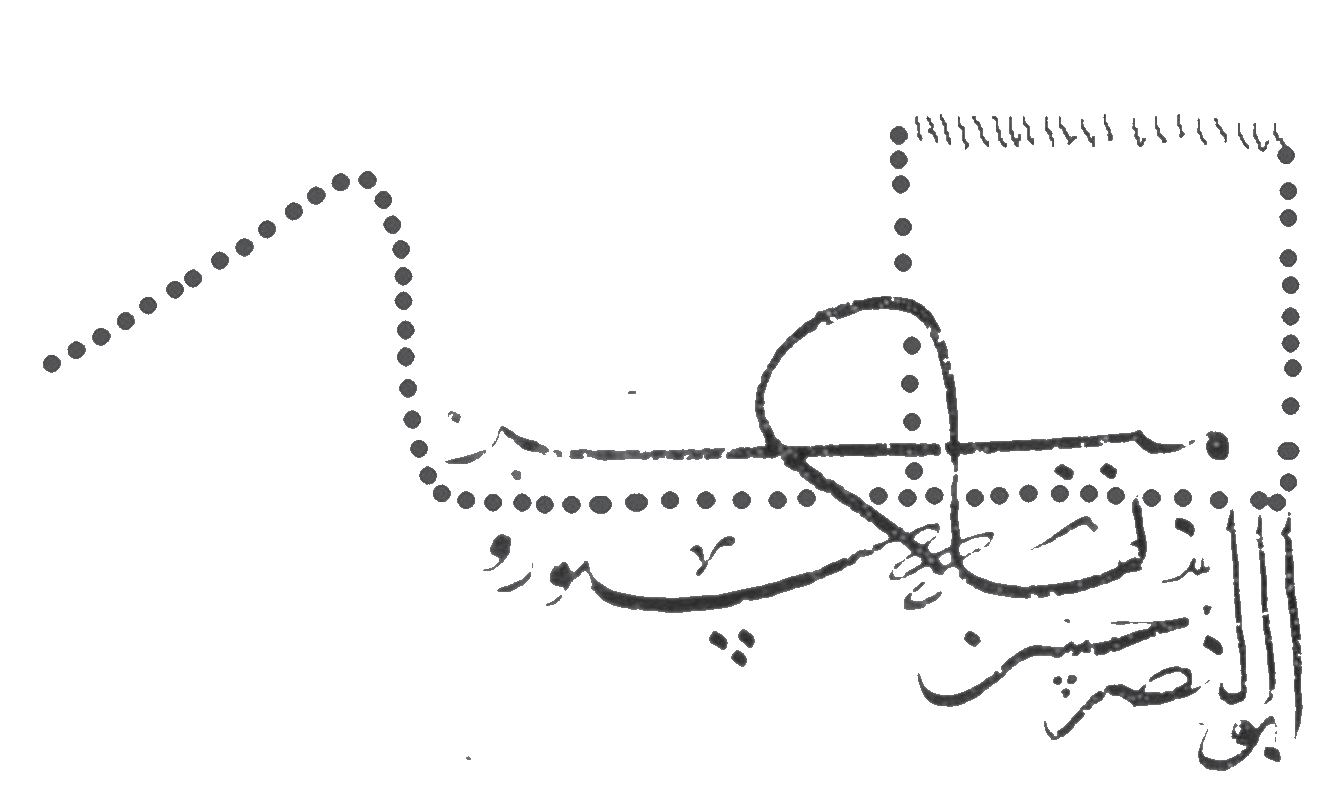
Tughra of Uzun Hasan

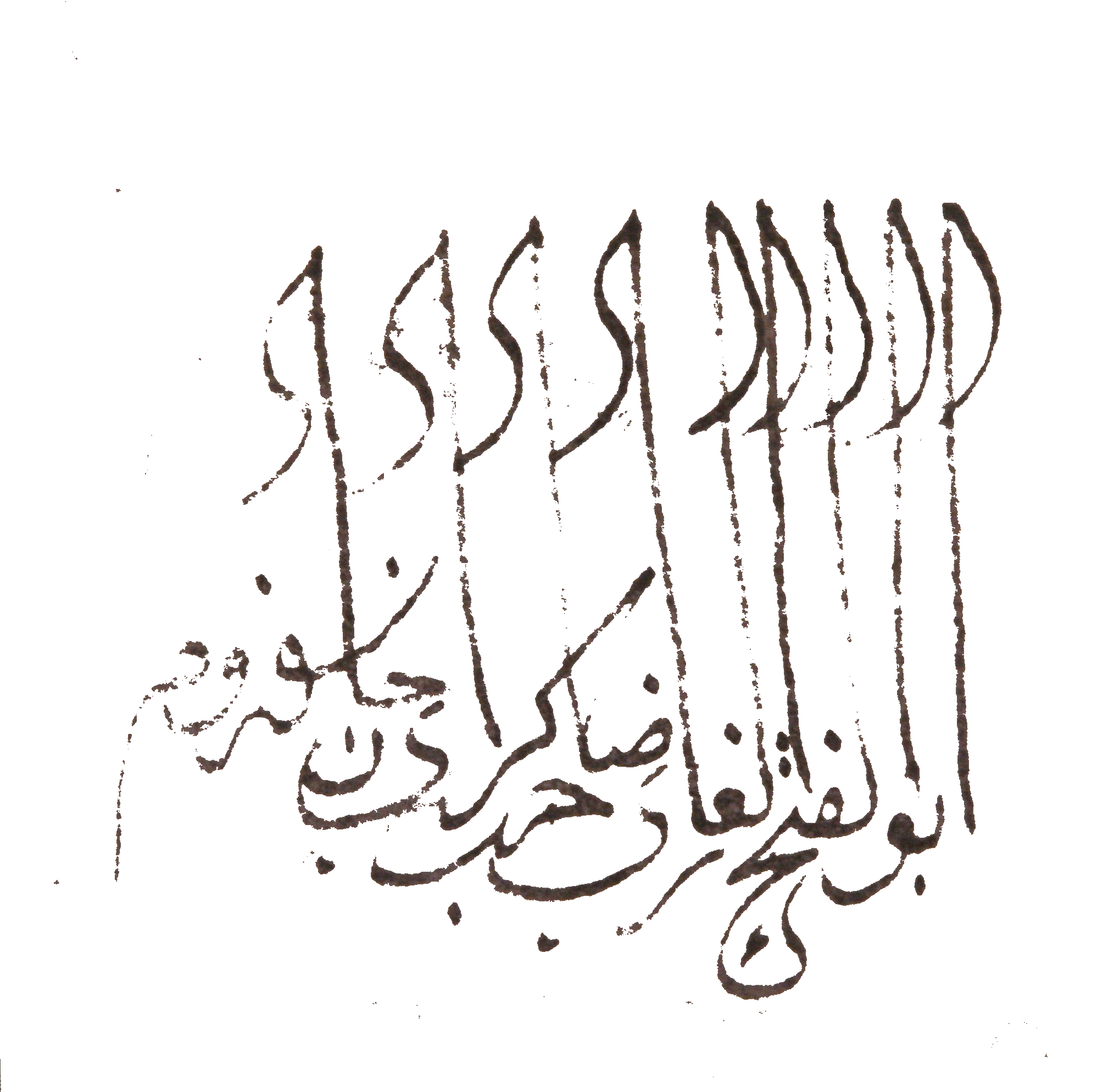
Tughra of Sahib I Giray

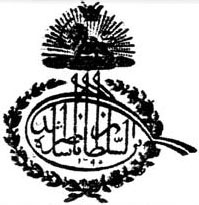
Tughra of Naser al-Din Shah Qajar

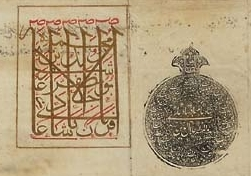
The official imperial "tughra" of the Mughal Empire in red ink, and in the lower right, there is the tughra of Shah Alam II.

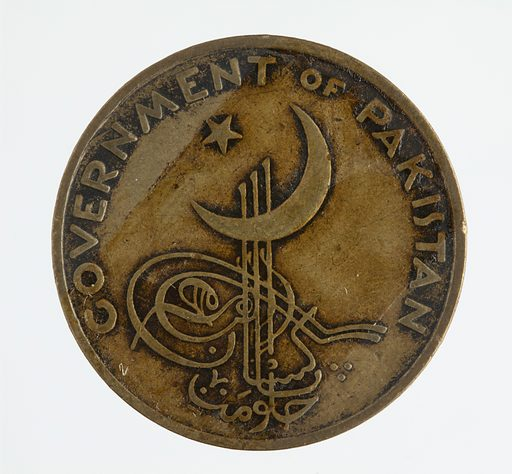
Tughra of Government of Pakistan on a 1 pice coin, 1957

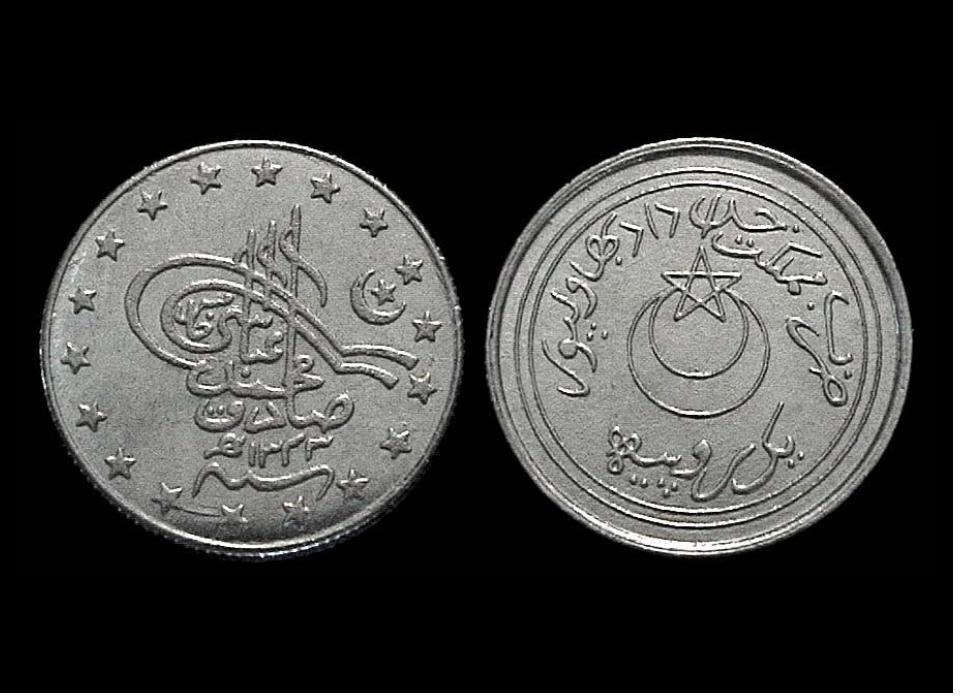
Tughra of Nawab of Bahawalpur on a Bahawalpur (princely state) coin

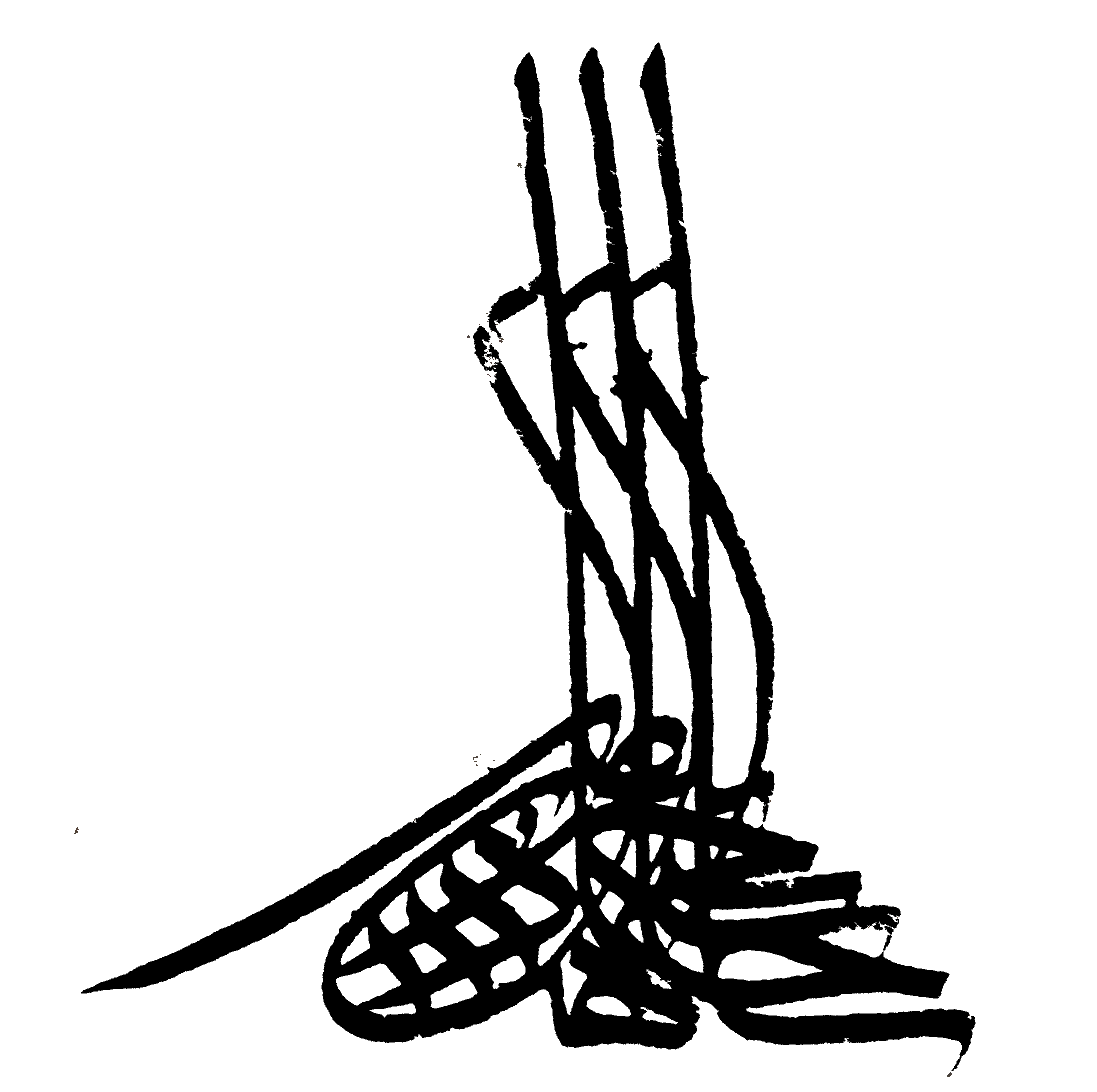
Tughra of Şahin Giray

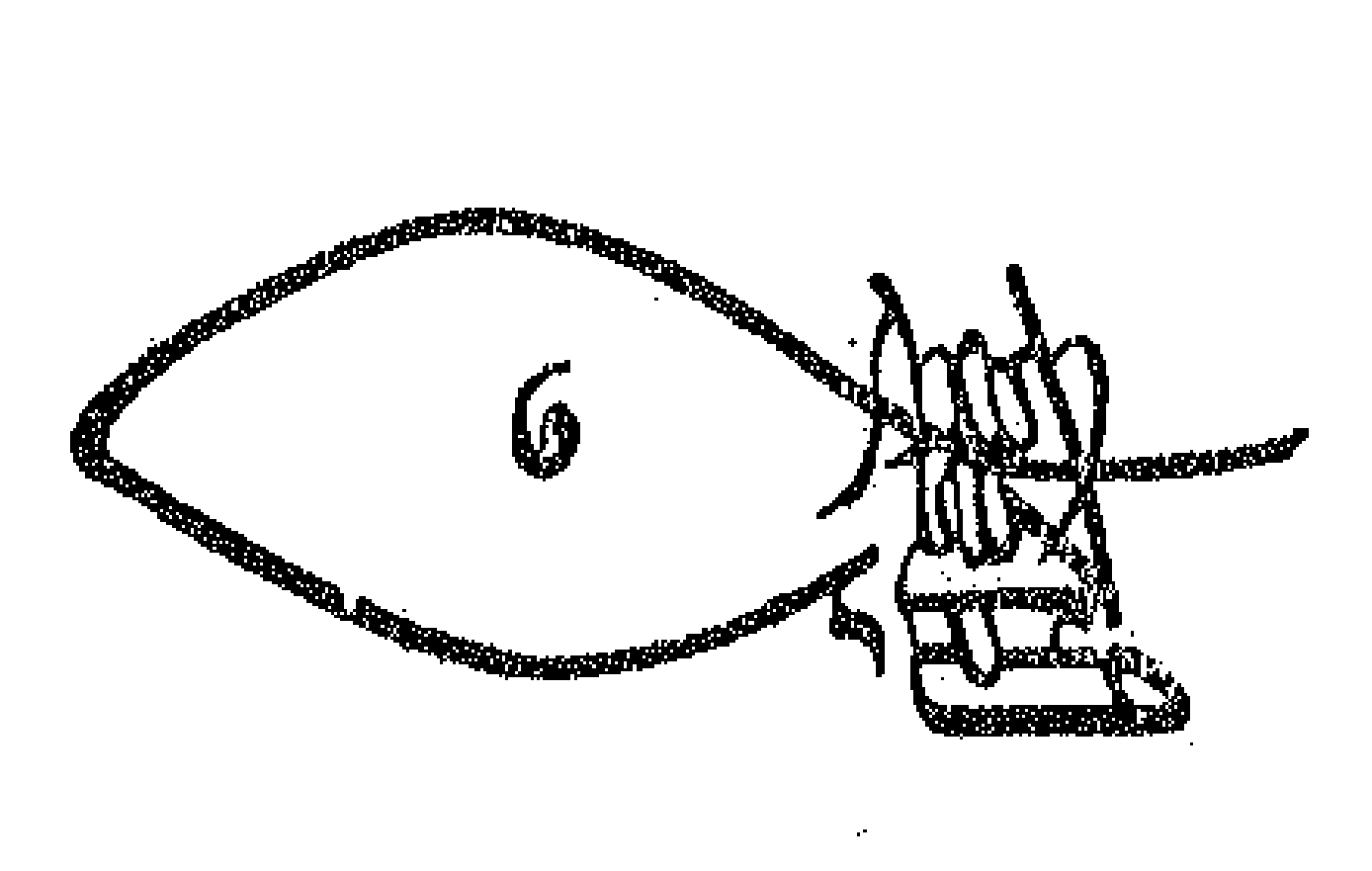
Tughra of Hass Murad Pasha

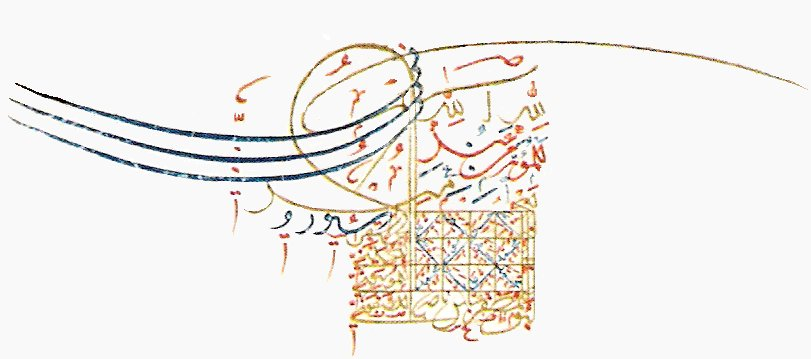
Tughra of Abbas II

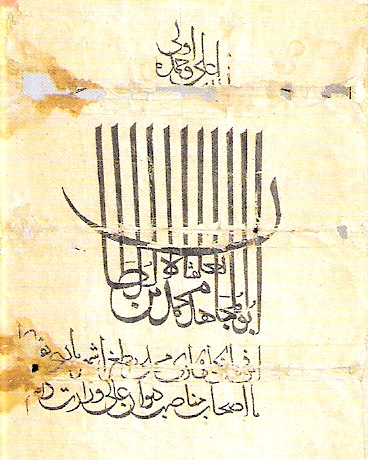
The tughra of Muhammad bin Tughluq

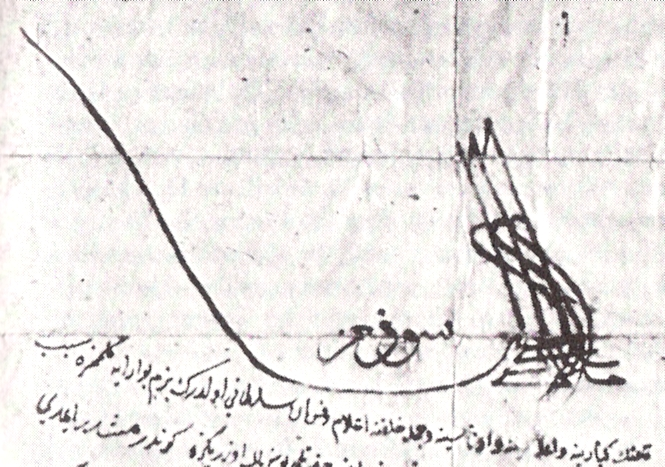
Tughra of Khan Murad Giray

Tughra of Mohammad Zahir Shah of Afghanistan

== Post-imperial interpretations ==
There are modern calligraphy artists that use the characteristic tughra form today. Examples are the tughras of Russian president Vladimir Putin and Emperor of Japan, Akihito, created by artist Vladimir Popov.

== See also ==
- Huaya, stylised calligraphic signatures used in East Asia
- Khelrtva, stylised calligraphic signatures used in Georgia
- Rota (papal signature)
- Totem
