= Rooster's Brewery =

Independent Craft Brewery in Harrogate, North Yorkshire, England

Rooster's Brewing Co.
- Location: Knaresborough, North Yorkshire, England
- Opened: 1993
- Annual production volume: 4,000 barrels per annum
- Owned by: Ian Fozard (independent)
- Website: https://www.roosters.co.uk/

Rooster's Brewing Co. is a family-owned brewery in Harrogate, North Yorkshire, England. The Rooster's brewery was established by Sean and Alison Franklin in 1993. In 2011, the Franklins sold the brewery to Ian Fozard and his sons Tom and Oliver.

== Outlaw Brewing Co. ==
Outlaw Brewing Co. is a subsidiary label of Rooster's Brewery. Under this name, the company makes experimental and seasonal beers.

== Awards ==
Rooster Brewing has received awards at the following competitions or trade shows:

- 2005 Brewing Industry International Awards
- 2006 World Beer Cup
- 2015 International Brewing Awards
- 2017 International Brewing Awards
- 2018 SIBA National Beer Awards
- 2019 SIBA National Beer Awards
- 2020 SIBA National Beer Awards
- 2021 International Brewing Awards
