= Rota (papal signature) =

Symbols

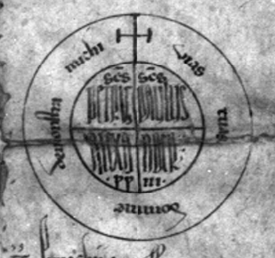
Rota of Pope Alexander III, AD 1175

The rota is one of the symbols used by the pope to authenticate documents such as papal bulls. It is a cross inscribed in two concentric circles. Pope Leo IX was the first pope to use it.

The four inner quadrants contain: "Petrus", "Paulus", the pope's name, and the pope's ordinal number. The pope's autograph or motto is sometimes inscribed between the concentric circles.

A rota was also used by monarchs for the authentication of documents and diplomas. (Note: For instance, it was used by William I and William II of Sicily.)

== See also ==
- Signum manus
- Tughra
- Khelrtva
