= Rooster bowl =

Pottery by Hakka people in China

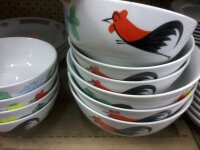

The rooster bowl (simplified Chinese: 公鸡碗; traditional Chinese: 公雞碗, 公鷄碗; pinyin: gōngjī wǎn; Jyutping: gai1 gung1 wun2, Indonesian: Mangkuk Ayam Jago, Thai: ชามตราไก่, Chiu Chow: Koi Ua) began in China over a hundred years ago by Hakka people in Guangdong Province.

== Background ==
In the late Qing Dynasty, Guangzhou, China, potters in prefectures like Meixian and Jiaying crafted ordinary white bowls without any patterns on them. A ceramicist from Jiaying named Sze Han was first credited for painting a rooster graphic on the bowls. The drawn rooster, typically depicted as a red junglefowl, had a red neck and trunk, black tail and legs walking on green grass, with purple peonies and green leaves cut with black outline. Generally, three banana trees and sometimes bats were drawn on the opposite side of the rooster. There were flowers and small leaves on the bottom of the bowl. This general design is still followed to this day. The quality of rooster bowls are durable, and the design's aesthetics have caused the rooster bowl to be a standard bowl used by the Chinese.

There are different sizes of rooster bowls: 4 inches wide, 5 inches wide, 6 inches deep, 8 inches wide and 8 inches deep. The 5 and 6 inch wide sizes are typically used for households and restaurants, and 7 and 8 inch sizes were used for laborers because of their larger portion sizes.

== In Thailand ==
Before World War II, Chinese merchants in Song Wat Road, Bangkok, ordered rooster bowls to sell because in that time, they were very cheap. During the Chinese-Japanese War, they were in short supply and the prices were rising; therefore, Thailand had the first manufacturer of rooster bowl. The first factory was in Ratchathewi district, Bangkok by Hakka people. When the war ended, the entrepreneurs produced more bowls because the characteristics of the bowl were suitable for eating with chopsticks. Later, Thai people started using the bowl because noodles have been commonly served in this type of food bowl due to its very durable features.

Around 1957, Chinese people in Thailand moved to set up a factory and furnace in Lampang province because of the availability of kaolin that is most suitable for producing rooster bowls at Chae-Hom District, Lampang.

In 1962, the manufactures started using the technique of burning bowls for one time and modifying the pattern to be the green rooster with blue tail with pink flowers to reduce the detail. It is very popular in market because of the cheapness and the toughness of the bowl. In 1963 this factory turned to produce Japanese crockery. Now Lampang is the only one province that continues to produce the bowls, but it is difficult to find the artisans that keep the original style, and the colors used for drawing the rooster are expensive. Therefore, people start to collect and buy the original rooster bowls, making rooster bowl prices rise because of the rarity.

Rooster bowl has been registered as a Geographical Indication (GI) product of Lampang, Thailand.
