= Rooster Flag =

Rooster flag may refer to:

- Cock flag, the flag of the Hindu god Kartikeya
- Flag of Wallonia, sub-national flag in Belgium which depicts a red rooster
