= Roster =

Roster may refer to:

- Roster (workplace), a list of employees and associated information for a given time period, sometimes referred to as a rota
- A list of players who are eligible to compete for a sports team
- Roster notation, a notation for specifying mathematical sets.

== People ==
- Fred H. Roster (1944–2017), American sculptor
- Kevin Roster (1983–2019), American poker player and activist
- Roster McCabe, American rock band active during 2006–2014

== Places ==
- Roster, Caithness, a township in the Scottish council area of Highland, United Kingdom
- Roster Road Halt railway station, in Highland, United Kingdom

== Sports ==
- 53-man roster, of the National Football League
- Developmental roster, of Major League Soccer
- Major League Baseball rosters
  - Active roster (baseball)
  - 40-man roster (officially the "expanded roster")
- Minor League Baseball rosters

== See also ==
- Rooster (disambiguation)
- Rostrum (ship)
- Rota (disambiguation)
