= Rooster olives =

Chinese olives

Rooster olives are Chinese olives and olive dishes sold by street vendors in Guangzhou, China in a tradition dating back to the Qing dynasty. The vendors are garbed in a traditional, brightly colored rooster costume playing suasion horn and yelling, in residential areas. In some places, chicken and lam is called "flying lam", because the vendors throw the olives to customers living on higher floors. They pack the olive in a small paper bag, and if someone throws money at them, they throw back an olive.

== Chicken and lam ==
Olives are a traditional Chinese ingredient, one used in dishes such as Chicken and Lam (Lam is the Chinese word for a white olive.)

Fresh olives undergo a complicated process; mixed with Chinese herbs and seasoning. Different pickling procedures make for varied flavors. The sweet version is Shun Lam, the salty one is Licorice Lam, the spicy one is Chili Lam.

The pickled olive is placed inside chicken dressing.

== History ==
Chicken and Lam became popular during the 1930s and 1940s, due to the increasing pace of life. More recently the practice mostly ended.

The Shangxiajiu Road, the busiest business district, is probably the only place where Chicken and Lam is still offered. This is because the Guangzhou Government classified the dish and practice as part of the city's cultural heritage. Subsidies are offered to encourage now-licensed, government employee vendors to continue.

A vendor can sell around 50 servings of Chicken and Lam per day. However, the job is demanding. One vendor stated, 'The chicken dressing weigh's 5 kg and we have to wear it for 12 hours every day'. The long work hours is believed to be another reason that stops young people from becoming vendors.

== Nutrition ==
The vitamin C content of Chinese olives is 10 times that of apples and 5 times that of pears. It offers higher calcium, protein, carbohydrate, fiber, iron and phosphorus.
