= El Gallo =

El Gallo (Spanish for "The Rooster") may refer to

Fictional characters

- El Gallo, a character in the musical The Fantasticks

Geology

- El Gallo Formation, in Mexico

People

- Luis Aguilar (actor) (1918–97), Mexican actor and singer "El Gallo Giro"
- Martín Castillo (born 1977), Mexican boxer "El Gallo"
- Juan de la Rosa (born 1986), Mexican boxer "El Gallo Negro"
- Valentín Elizalde (1979–2006), Mexican singer "El Gallo de Oro"
- José Gómez Ortega (1895–1920), Spanish matador "El Gallo"
- Rafael Gómez Ortega (1882–1960), Spanish matador "El Gallo"
- Antonio Rivera (1963–2005), Puerto Rican boxer "El Gallo Rivera"
- José Antonio Rivera (born 1973), American boxer "El Gallo"
- Tito Rojas (born 1955), Puerto Rican singer "El Gallo"
- El Gallo (wrestler) (born 1984), ring name of Mexican masked professional wrestler
- Rosendo "El Gallo" Díaz, singer, Cuban salsa and timba ensemble, Manolito y su Trabuco
- Juan Francisco Estrada (born 1990), Mexican boxer
- Wil Myers (born 1990), professional baseball player "El Gallo"
- Jake Paul (born 1997), American boxer, actor and YouTuber "El Gallo"

Ships

- SS El Gallo a British tanker in service 1946–59

Places

- San Rafael, New Mexico, also known as "El Gallo"

== See also ==
- Jake Paul, American boxer known as "El Gallo De Dorado"
