= Rota (surname) =

Rota is a surname. Notable people with the surname include:

- Alfredo Rota (born 1975), Italian fencer
- Anthony Rota (born 1961), Canadian Member of Parliament
- Carlo Rota (born 1961), Canadian chef and actor
- Cristina Rota (born 1945), Argentine playwright, actress, director and acting coach
- Darcy Rota (born 1953), Canadian ice hockey player
- Flavio Rota (born 1966), Swiss gymnast
- Gian-Carlo Rota (1932–1999), Italian-born American mathematician and philosopher
- Jérôme Rota (born 1973), French software developer
- Juan Diego Botto Rota (born 1975), Argentine-Spanish actor and director
- Lazaros Rota (born 1997), Greek football player
- Marco Rota (born 1942), Italian Disney comic artist
- Martino Rota (c. 1520–1583), artist
- Nino Rota (1911–1979), Italian composer
- Randy Rota (born 1950), Canadian ice hockey player
- Sal Rota, American musician
- Simone Rota (born 1984), Filipino football player

== See also ==
- Rota (disambiguation)
