= Vegas Red Rooster =

Swinger tclub in Las Vegas, Nevada, US

Coordinates: 36.095979°N 115.033080°W

Vegas Red Rooster is a 13,000 square feet (1,200 m^{2}) swingers club located in Whitney, Nevada in the Las Vegas Valley. The club hosted the after party for the annual Lifestyles Convention in Las Vegas. The Red Rooster is a member of NASCA International.

== History ==
The Red Rooster was founded in 1982 and consisted of an 850-square-foot (79 m^{2}) space. The Rooster is the oldest swingers club in the Las Vegas area.
