= Bathhouse =

Bathhouse may refer to:

- Public baths, public facilities for bathing
- Gay bathhouse, private clubs for gay men
- The Bathhouse, a 1929 play by Vladimir Mayakovsky
- Bathhouse: The Musical!, a 2006 musical by Tim Evanicki and Esther Daack
