= Everard Baths =

Bathhouse in New York City

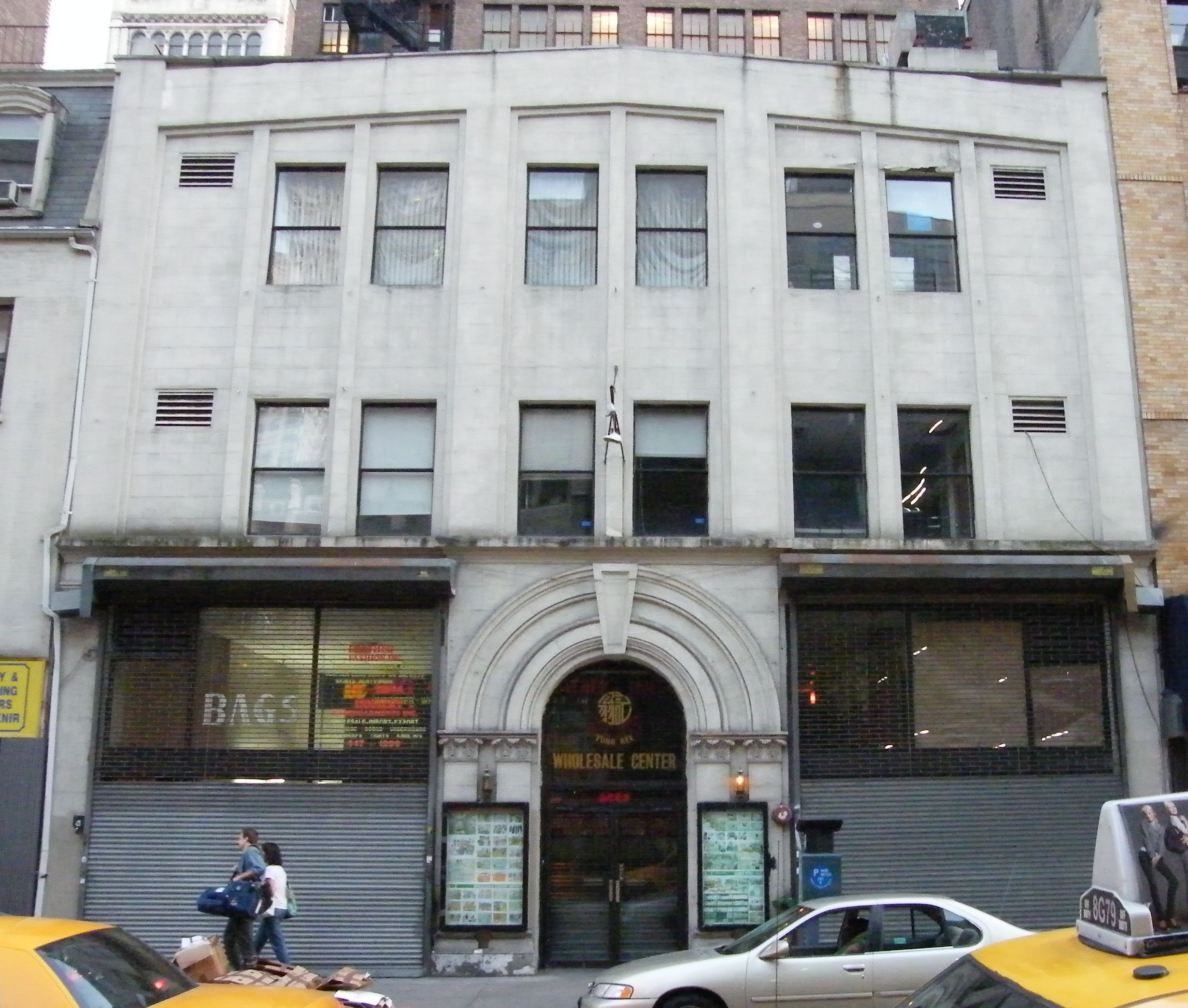
- Baths in 2009

General information
- Type: Bath house
- Location: 28 West 28th Street, New York City, United States
- Coordinates: 40.7454°N 73.9892°W
- Opened: 1888
- Renovated: 1977
- Closed: April 1986

Other information
- Facilities: private rooms, wet and dry steamrooms, pool

The Everard Baths or Everard Spa Turkish Bathhouse was a gay bathhouse at 28 West 28th Street in New York City that operated from 1888 to 1986. The venue occupied an adaptively reused church building and was the site of a deadly fire.

== History ==
Everard Baths was a Victorian Turkish bath founded by financier James Everard in 1888 in a former church building, designed in a typical late-19th-century Victorian Romanesque Revival architectural style. Everard, who operated the Everard brewery on 135th Street, converted it to a bathhouse in 1888. Everard's bathhouse was intended for general health and fitness.

On November 28, 1898, a soldier was found dead in his room at the baths and gas was suspected.

On January 5, 1919, the New York Society for the Suppression of Vice encouraged a police raid in which the manager and nine customers were arrested for lewd behavior. It was raided again in 1920 with 15 arrests.

It was patronized largely by homosexuals by the 1920s and became the community's preeminent social venue from the 1930s onward. It was patronized by gay men before the 1920s and by the 1930s had a reputation as the "classiest, safest, and best known of the baths," eventually picking up the nickname "Everhard".

The entrance was lit by two green lamps, giving it, according to patrons, the appearance of a police precinct, and giving rise to speculation that it was owned for a period by the Patrolmen's Benevolent Association of the City of New York (a claim that was vehemently denied after patrons died in a 1977 fire).

Emlyn Williams described a visit in 1927:

Up some stairs at a desk an ashen bored man in shirtsleeves produced a ledger crammed with illegible scrawls. I added mine, paid my dollar, was handed a key, towel and robe, hung the key on my wrist and mounted to a large floor as big as a warehouse and as high: intersecting rows of private rooms each windowless cell dark except from the glimmer from above through wire-netting shredded with dust and containing a narrow workhouse bed...[he later heard] a casual whisper, a sigh lighter than thistle-down, a smothered moan. Then appeasement: the snap of a lighter as two strangers sat back for a smoke and polite murmured small talk, such as they might exchange in a gym.

Among the documented patrons were Alfred Lunt, Clifton Webb, Noël Coward, Lorenz Hart, Truman Capote, Charles James, Gore Vidal, and Rudolf Nureyev. Capote and Ned Rorem wrote about their visits.

On May 25, 1977, nine patrons (ages 17 to 40) were killed in a fire: seven from smoke inhalation, one from respiratory burns, and one who had jumped from an upper floor. Contributing factors were the deteriorating conditions and the lack of sprinklers. Firefighters said they were thwarted in rescue efforts by paneling covering the windows. Between 80 and 100 patrons left the building; the indefinite number was because the club did not have registration at the time. Most of the victims were identified by friends rather than family. Accounts said costs were $5 for a locker or $7 for a cubicle ($6 and $9.25 on weekends).

Despite total destruction of the top two floors, the two floors were rebuilt, and the baths reopened. However, it was closed in April 1986 by New York City mayor Ed Koch during the city's campaign to close such venues during the AIDS epidemic.

== Popular culture ==
Michael Rumaker wrote a book A Day and a Night at the Baths, devoted totally to the baths.

The bathhouse is described in the novels Dancer from the Dance by Andrew Holleran, Faggots by Larry Kramer, and Now Voyagers by James McCourt.

The bathhouse is the subject of Goodbye Seventies by Todd Verow.
