= Faggots (novel) =

1978 book by Larry Kramer

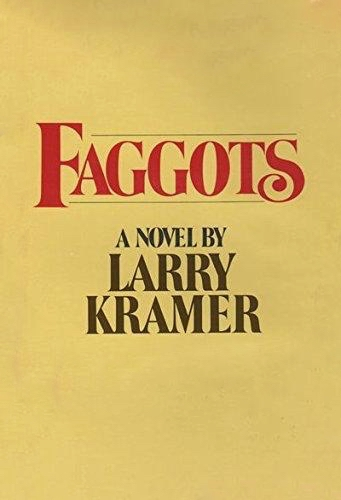
- Cover of the first edition
- Author: Larry Kramer
- Language: English
- Genre: Gay literature
- Published: 1978, Random House
- Publication date: November 17, 1978
- Publication place: United States
- Media type: Print (Hardcover and Paperback)
- Pages: 304
- ISBN: 0394410955
- OCLC: 43526781
- LC Class: PS3561.R252 F3

Faggots is a 1978 novel by Larry Kramer. It is a satirical portrayal of 1970s New York's very visible gay community in a time before AIDS. The novel's portrayal of promiscuous sex and recreational drug use provoked controversy and was condemned by some elements within the gay community.

== Summary ==
The main character, Fred Lemish, is loosely modeled on Kramer. Lemish wants to find a loving, long-term relationship. His desires are frustrated as he stumbles through an emotionally cold series of glory holes, bathhouses, BDSM encounters and group sex. He becomes disillusioned with the 1970s "fast lane" lifestyle dominating the gay subculture in and around New York.

Lemish also expresses discomfort with the widespread use of multiple street and prescription drugs helping to maintain the party atmosphere. Faggots details the use of over two dozen 1970s party drugs and intoxicants such as Seconal, poppers, LSD, Quaaludes, alcohol, marijuana, Valium, PCP, cocaine and heroin.

The book moves through, among other locales, a gay bathhouse called the "Everhard" (based on the Everard Baths), a large disco named Capriccio, an orgy at the apartment of a successful gay lawyer, the spectacular opening of a club called The Toilet Bowl, and ends with a tumultuous weekend on Fire Island.

== Characters ==
While Faggots contains over sixty named persons, only a few are fully fleshed-out characters. Some of the principal actors are listed here:

- Fred Lemish — 39, mustachioed screenwriter, once pudgy now trim-waisted; believes he should find true love by 40; very much in love with Dinky Adams. Fred longs for the approval of his straight brother, Ben. Fred's mother, Algonqua, appears in flashback as a classic Jewish mother. Fred's mousy and passive father, Lester, died before the novel begins.
- Dinky Adams — 30, bearded, in top physical shape; in high demand as a sex partner, he restlessly resists Fred's entreaties to settle down and make a household; his interest in leather and BDSM become more apparent as the book progresses.
- Timmy Purvis — 16, handsome youth from small-town Maryland; recruited by Paulie and Durwood to be part of R. Allan Pooker's gay porn empire; gains the attention of everyone at Garfield Toye's penthouse apartment orgy; later join's Hans Zoroaster's modeling agency.
- Randy Dildough — 30, president of Marathon Leisure Time, an entertainment company; thrill-seeking sadist; closeted at first, he becomes more public as the book progresses; desperately wants to make Timmy Purvis the next James Dean; sexually assaulted Robbie Swindon during a school play in high school.

...the widest field of shining waxed wood on which to move and glide and shake and boogie and turn and hug and hold and sweat and show the muscles, wiggle the ass, bump your crotch, clutch you tight, spin, spin, wave and shout, look and smile, say good-bye to all our cares, with all our brothers, a lifetime of friends, beside, around, above, bleachers stringing round all sides, everything bathed in light and sound, that legendary sound! ... .9034 psu's of decibelacular sound, all engorging all of the above, Hot Men!, Dancing!, Love!, Friendship!, this legendary spot of Heaven on Earth, our very own beloved exclusive club...

Bronstein family

- Abe Bronstein — millionaire cake-mix manufacturer; finances movies with his riches; considering financing gay film using Fred Lemish's screenplay.
- Ephra Bronstein — first wife of Abe; feels lesbian arousal from Nancellen Richtofen at the opening night of The Toilet Bowl, which they later consummate on Fire Island.
- Richard ("Richie") "Boo Boo" Bronstein — 24, son of Abe; keeps his body in top shape to increase his attractiveness on the gay scene; plots his own kidnapping to extort money from his father.
- Wyatt Bronstein — 15, from New Jersey; grandson of Abe and nephew of Richard; uses his 10-inch penis to earn money; exchanges incestuous fellatio with Richard at the opening night of The Toilet Bowl; agrees to help Richard with his fake kidnapping scheme.

Heiserdiener-Thalberg-Slough publicity firm

- Irving Slough — 55, and portly; former psychiatrist and founding partner of Heiserdiener-Thalberg-Slough, an international publicity firm; renowned for lavish productions at Fire Island; placed ad for buff young man which Dinky Adams answered, though he later becomes jealous of Dinky's attentions.
- Anthony Montano — 43, Fred Lemish's best friend; in charge of the Winston Man account at Heiserdiener-Thalberg-Slough; cruises abandoned dockside warehouses for dark, anonymous trysts; takes Wyatt Bronstein as his lover.
- Duncan "Winnie" Heinz — green-eyed, hay-haired Winston Man, male model extraordinaire and idol of all American gay men; self-supporting as a collateral heir to the pickle/ketchup fortune.
- Troy Mommser — creative director at Heiserdiener-Thalberg-Slough; deflowers Timmy Purvis at Garfield Toye's orgy.

Drag queens

- Patty, Maxine, and Laverne — drag queens; stationary dancers; owners of the Balalaika disco; Laverne was Dinky's last lover before Dinky took up with Fred; despondent after the death of Patty in the fire at the Everhard Baths, Laverne returns to using his birth name, Jack Humpstone.
- Miss Yootha Truth — drag performer; starving black man and aspiring singer; friend of Miss Rollarette.
- Miss Rollarette — drag performer; carries a wand and goes about on roller skates; friend of Miss Yootha Truth.

Tertiary characters

- Blaze Sorority — birth name Allan Bloomstein, writes articles for gay newsletter; engages in beer-chugging contest at Fire Island with fellow gay journalist Bella.
- Dordogna del Dongo — née Jones from Flatbush, middle-aged straight hanger-on of the gay scene; enjoys seducing gay men, including, after great effort, Randy Dildough at Fire Island.
- Durwood and Paulie — recruiters for R. Allan Pooker's Stud Studios; discover Timmy Purvis as he arrives in New York.
- Garfield Toye — gay activist and attorney; hosts the last orgy before everyone leaves for Fire Island for Memorial Day weekend.
- Hans Zoroaster — 55; heads the Hans Zoroaster Agency, with a stable of male models; he eventually adds the handsome young Timmy Purvis to his roster; friend of Irving Slough.
- Myron Musselman — Randy Dildough's boss; leads the Pan-Pacific family of companies, including Marathon Leisure Time.
- Robbie Swindon — Mormon architect; muscled gymnast's body; expelled from Brigham Young for being caught jerking off; sexually assaulted by Randy Dildough during a school play in high school; primarily courting Laverne.

== Reception ==
The book has been influential over the years, though many have criticized Kramer for perceived negativity toward his subject matter and writing style. Upon Faggots' release, the book was banned in the only gay bookstore in Manhattan.

The Washington Post noted that the book focused on "a peculiarly ugly, vicious, perverse, depraved, sado-masochistic subculture in which love does not exist–a subculture that homosexuals have been at pains to say is not representative of homosexual life" and slammed Kramer for "Pretty Lousy Writing." The New York Times also criticized Kramer's writing abilities, calling it "sentence for sentence, some of the worst writing [...] encountered in a published manuscript."

"I'm tired of using my body as a faceless thing to lure another faceless thing, I want to love a Person!, I want to go out and live in that world with that Person, a Person who loves me, we shouldn't have to be faithful, we should want to be faithful!, love grows, sex gets better, if you don't drain all your fucking energy off somewhere else" [...] "I've lived all over the world and I haven't seen more than half a dozen couples who have what I want." [...] It tells me something. It tells me no relationship in the world could survive the shit we lay on it. It tells me we're not looking at the reasons why we're doing the things we're doing. It tells me we've got a lot of work to do. A lot of looking to do. It tells me that, if those happy couples are there, they better come out of the woodwork fast and show themselves pronto so we can have a few examples for unbelieving heathens like you that it's possible. Before you fuck yourself to death."

— Larry Kramer, Faggots

In the advent of the AIDS crisis in the early 1980s, it was discovered that the drug use, multiple partner sex and other behavior condemned in Faggots increased the risk of HIV, which seemed to validate Kramer's criticism of homosexual promiscuity. Kramer was somewhat redeemed in the gay community.

The gay scholar John Lauritsen commented on Faggots, saying, "The book showed courage and insight. It touched a raw nerve. It was disgusting, and very funny." The historian Martin Duberman writes that "to me, Faggots represented not uncanny clairvoyance but merely Kramer's own garden-variety sex-negativism".

== See also ==
- Dancer from the Dance written by Andrew Holleran, published in 1978.
- Sexual Ecology written by Gabriel Rotello, published in 1997.
