= The Beauty of Men =

1996 novel by Andrew Holleran

- Author: Andrew Holleran
- Language: English
- Publication date: 1996

The Beauty of Men is a 1996 novel by Andrew Holleran, about Lark, a 47-year-old single gay man, who has moved to Florida to help care for his mother, who became paralyzed after a fall.

== Story ==
The novel is set in the mid-1980s when AIDS was ravaging a generation of gay men back home in New York City. In Florida, Lark lives alone, has few friends, terrified of venturing out in the daylight. Had he stayed in New York he would be just as alone for a different reason. Now, instead of going to clubs and bath houses, he goes to the boat ramp and the one local gay bar two towns over in Gainesville. He has become obsessed with a local man named Becker with whom he spent one long night and has followed periodically since.

== Award nominations ==
It was nominated for the 1997 ALA Gay Lesbian Bisexual Books award and the Lambda Book Award for Gay Fiction.
