= Christopher Street (magazine) =

Gay-oriented magazine published in New York City

- Christopher Street #1, cover dated July 1, 1976
- Editor-in-chief: Charles Ortleb
- Categories: Men's magazine
- Frequency: monthly
- First issue: July 1, 1976
- Final issue Number: December 1, 1995; Vol 19 No 4
- Company: That New Magazine Inc
- Country: United States
- Based in: New York, New York, United States
- Language: English
- Website: https://christopherstreetmag.com/

Christopher Street was an American gay-oriented magazine published in New York City, New York, by Charles Ortleb. It was founded in 1976 by Ortleb and Michael Denneny, an openly gay editor in book publishing. Two years later, the magazine had a circulation of 20,000 and annual revenues of $250,000. Known both for its serious discussion of issues within the gay community and its satire of anti-gay criticism, it was one of the two most widely read gay-issues publications in the United States. Christopher Street covered politics and culture and its aim was to become a gay equivalent of The New Yorker.

The magazine featured original fiction and non-fiction work from such notable authors as Andrew Holleran, Felice Picano, Gore Vidal, Edmund White, and John Preston, as well as emerging gay writers such as Christopher Bram, Allen Barnett, John Fox, Scott Heim, John Alan Lee, Patrick Merla, Randy Shilts and Matthew Stadler. The cartoons signed (Rick) Fiala, Lublin, (Henryk) Baum, Bertram Dusk, Dean, and March were all drawn by Rick Fiala, the founding art director of Christopher Street.

First published in July 1976, Christopher Street printed 231 issues before closing its doors in December 1995.

In 2016, the magazine received the Michele Karlsberg Leadership Award from the Publishing Triangle.

== Collections of Christopher Street material ==
- And God Bless Uncle Harry and His Roommate Jack Who We Are Not Supposed to Talk About: cartoons from Christopher Street magazine, Avon Books, 1978 ISBN 0380018977. The cartoon that provided the title of the collection was a collaboration between Charles Ortleb (caption) and Andy Tabbat (illustration). It was first published in the premiere issue of Christopher Street.
- Aphrodisiac, fiction from Christopher Street. New York: Coward, McCann & Geoghegan, 1980 ISBN 0698110358. Reprinted unchanged, New York: Putnam, 1982.
- Charles Ortleb and Richard Fiala, Le gay ghetto: gay cartoons from Christopher Street, St. Martin's Press, 1980 ISBN 0312475888.
- The Christopher Street Reader, ed. Michael Denneny; Charles Ortleb; Thomas Steele. New York: Coward, McCann & Geoghegan, 1983 ISBN 0698111257. Issued in Britain as The View from Christopher Street, Chatto & Windus, 1984 ISBN 0701129069.
- First Love/Last Love: New Fiction from Christopher Street, ed. Michael Denneny; Charles Ortleb; Thomas Steele. New York: Putnam, 1985 ISBN 0399130829.
- Boyd McDonald, Cruising the Movies: A Sexual Guide to "Oldies" on TV, Gay Presses of New York, 1985 ISBN 091401708X: a collection of movie reviews, all but a few first published in Christopher Street.
- Quentin Crisp, How to Go to the Movies: A Guide for the Perplexed, St. Martin's Press, 1989 ISBN 0-312-05444-0: more Christopher Street movie reviews.
- Andrew Holleran. Ground Zero. New York: Morrow, 1988. ISBN 9780688033576. Collection of essays from Christopher Street written in real time as AIDS devastated the gay community of New York.
