= List of films featuring gay bathhouses =

== Inclusion criteria ==
This is an annotated list of films by year of release that are notable for featuring, or including scenes of, Gay bathhouses or gay themes set in bathhouses. Films that have a Wikipedia page are linked. Films that do not have a Wikipedia page must be supported with reliable sources. Films that have no gay context cannot be included.

The purpose of this list is to illustrate the often taboo subject of gay bathhouse culture and its influence.

== Film list ==
Year	Film title	Description
1973	The Day of the Jackal	The Jackal knows all Parisian hotels are being watched by police. He enters a bathhouse and is approached by another man, who picks him up. They go to the man's apartment. Later, the man sees a television in a shop window, recognizing the Jackal's face but not knowing why. As he mentions this to the Jackal, the television in the apartment has a newsflash that Lundquist is wanted for the murder of Madame de Montpellier. The Jackal kills the man off-screen in his kitchen, then switches off the television.
1975	Saturday Night at the Baths	A musician from Montana finds work and other things at The Continental Baths, a gay bathhouse in New York City.
1976	The Ritz	The farce is set in a gay bathhouse in Manhattan, where an unsuspecting Cleveland businessman has taken refuge from his homicidal mobster brother-in-law. A number of characters feature, including a rabid chubby chaser, go-go boys, a squeaky-voiced detective, and a third-rate Puerto Rican entertainer with visions of Broadway glory who mistakes him for a famous producer and whom he mistakes for a man in drag.
1993	And the Band Played On	HBO adaptation of Randy Shilts's journalistic history of the AIDS epidemic.
1993	Zero Patience	Canadian film directed by John Greyson which refutes the patient zero theory of HIV's introduction to North America which was promulgated in Randy Shilts's book. A time-displaced Sir Richard Francis Burton visits a gay bathhouse in the course of his research.
1997	Hamam (in Italian)	Film featuring a derelict hamam ("Turkish bath") where the leading character decides to refurbish it and gradually becomes attracted to the son of the family he is staying with.
1997	The River (in Chinese)	The River contains a sequence in which the leading character visits a gay bathhouse and has sex in a totally dark room with his father, who slaps him brutally when the light goes on.
2004	Cachorro (Bear Cub) (in Spanish)	A bearish gay man ends up looking after his nephew while his sister goes away to India. He develops a fatherly bond with the boy and has to alter his lifestyle. Scenes of the leading character's gay sex life include picking up men at a bathhouse (filmed at the gay Sauna Principe, Madrid).
2005	Bathhouse	A group of gay friends experience bathhouse culture and one manages to find love. The entire film is set in a gay bathhouse.
2007	Chuecatown (Boys Town)	A black comedy featuring a couple of gay bears. The final chase sequence and shoot-out take place in a gay bathhouse.
2008	Kiss Me Deadly	Thriller whose principal character is a gay man. Features a gay bathhouse in Rome.
2008	Another Gay Sequel: Gays Gone Wild	Comedy that features a gay bathhouse and naked gay zombies in a dream sequence.
2025	Sauna	A gay man revels in nightlife until he meets a transgender man.
