= Michael Denneny =

American editor (1943–2023)

- Born: March 2, 1943; Providence, Rhode Island, U.S.
- Died: April 12/15, 2023 (aged 80); Manhattan, New York, U.S.
- Education: University of Chicago
- Occupations: Editor; literary consultant; publisher; writer
- Writing career
- Language: English

Michael Denneny (March 2, 1943 – April 12 or 15, 2023) was an American editor and author. He was one of the first openly gay editors at a major publishing house.

== Early life ==
Denneny was born in Providence, Rhode Island, and grew up in Pawtucket nearby. His father Leo was a mill worker and later worked for the Postal Service. His mother Dorothy (née Wilkinson) also worked in a mill. He had two brothers, Johnny who died from cancer in 1986 and his surviving brother, Joey. Joe described Pawtucket as "gloomy" and said that Michael "retreated into books at an early age".

== Education and career ==
Denneny graduated from the University of Chicago with a bachelor's degree in history in 1967. He then continued with graduate studies at the school's Committee on Social Thought under philosopher Hannah Arendt. On and off, he became the assistant of Arendt and was later an informal assistant of Michel Foucault as well.

Denneny moved to New York City in 1971 after the Stonewall riots and was shortly thereafter hired at Macmillan. There he published a book version of Ntozake Shange’s feminist play for colored girls who have considered suicide / when the rainbow is enuf.

In 1976, he and Chuck Ortleb started the gay literary magazine Christopher Street. According to Denneny, shortly before it started publishing several top gay men who were not open about their gayness subtly threatened to end his career if his name appeared in the magazine. In 1977, Denneny was fired by Macmillan when it was learned that he was going to publish The Homosexuals by Alan Ebert which contained interviews with gay men. He was briefly rehired to present the book at a sales conference because it was subsequently to be published due to legal obligations, but when his connection to Christopher Street became apparent he was fired again.

During this time he worked on the gay publication the New York Native in addition to Christopher Street. After applying for a large number of jobs at Manhattan publishers while openly admitting to being gay, in 1977 he was hired at St. Martin's Press, and wrote two books of his own, Lovers and Decent Passions.

In 1987 Denneny started the LGBT Stonewall Inn Editions paperback imprint at St. Martin’s, the first time a major publishing house had done such, and republished many books that had appeared previously in hard cover.

Denneny worked at St. Martin's until 2002 aside from two years at Crown Publishing Group, and subsequently left to become a freelance editor and consultant.

In 2002, Denneny won the Michele Karlsberg Leadership Award.

== Death ==
Denneny's death in April 2023 at his home in Manhattan was unexpected, which his brother Joe said was most likely due to a heart attack. He was found on April 15 but the exact day of his death (between the 12th and 15th) is not known.

== Bibliography ==
- Michael Denneny (1979). Lovers: The Story of Two Men.
- Michael Denneny (1984). Decent Passions: Real Stories about Love.
- Michael Denneny (2023). On Christopher Street: Life, Sex And Death After Stonewall. Chicago, London: University of Chicago Press. ISBN 9780226824611.

== Major works edited or published ==
- Alan Ebert (1977). The Homosexuals. Macmillan.
- Edmund White (1978). Nocturnes for the King of Naples. St. Martin's Press.
- G. Gordon Liddy (1980). Will: The Autobiography of G. Gordon Liddy. St. Martin's Press. ISBN 0312880146.
- Buckminster Fuller (1981). Critical Path. St. Martin's Press.
- Judith Thurman (1982). Isak Dinesen: The Life of a Storyteller. St. Martin's Press.
- Van Smith (1983). The Simply Divine Cut-Out Doll Book. St. Martin's Press.
- Robert Mapplethorpe (1986). Black Book. St. Martin's Press.
- Larry Duplechan (1986). Blackbird. St. Martin's Press.
- Randy Shilts (1987). And the Band Played On: Politics, People, and the AIDS Epidemic (1980–1985). ISBN 0-613-29872-1.
