= Ground Zero (book) =

1988 book of essays by Andrew Holleran

- Author: Andrew Holleran
- Publication date: 1988

Ground Zero (1988) is a book of essays by Andrew Holleran. The title refers to a catastrophic disaster in Lower Manhattan, namely the havoc wrought by AIDS in the 1980s among gay men. Holleran's essays are by turns thoughtful, reflective, angry, frustrated, and mournful in the extreme. Particularly notable are the twin essays "Notes on Promiscuity" and "Notes on Celibacy," each of which is a collection of provocative aphorisms.

In 2008, the book was reissued, with ten additional essays and a new introduction, under the title Chronicle of a Plague, Revisited: AIDS and Its Aftermath.
