= Bathhouse: The Musical! =

Bathhouse: the Musical!
- Music: Tim Evanicki; Esther Daack
- Lyrics: Tim Evanicki; Esther Daack
- Book: Tim Evanicki; Esther Daack
- Productions: 2006 Orlando; 2008 US tour; 2008 Canadian tour; 2009 Tampa; 2009 London; 2010 Paris

Bathhouse: the Musical! is a 2006 American musical written by Tim Evanicki and Esther Daack with additional material by Ryan Beck and Jason Wetzel. The show follows the story of Billy, a wide-eyed youth venturing into a bathhouse for the very first time. He is looking for love, but soon realizes that the other patrons are looking for something "a little more temporary". With some guidance, Billy soon learns the ins and outs of bathhouse etiquette.

The musical is structured like a revue composed of original songs that humorously depict the vagaries of men meeting other men online and in gay places. The show is intended for mature audiences as it contains explicit language and features a lot of gay sex-related themes.

Bathhouse: the Musical! premiered at the Orlando International Fringe Theater Festival in Orlando, Florida in June 2006. before the show found a home at the Footlight Theater in the same city. In 2008, a New-York production toured across the United-States and traveled to cities including Orlando, Florida; Tampa, Florida; Rochester, New York; Buffalo, New York; and Cleveland, Ohio. The same year, a Canadian tour brought the show to audiences in Montreal; Ottawa and Quebec City. A London production ran for five weeks at the Above The Stag Theatre in 2009.

== Plot ==
The show opens with the four characters making their entrance at the bathhouse and undressing as we get to know them better ("Friendly Neighborhood Bathhouse"). David is a young married man who finds it difficult to accept his homosexuality. Teddy is a young partygoer who likes to spend the end of the night in good company. Billy is an inexperienced boy who just came out and found the strength to cross the threshold of a bathhouse for the first time. He hopes he will be able to find the boy of his dreams in such a singular place. Maurice is a mature man with much sex-appeal who comes down here to unwind after a stressful week. He is one of the pillars of the bathhouse.
An anonymous voice-over welcomes Billy. Maurice then takes Billy for a tour of the bathhouse and gives him some advice as how to behave in this place ("The Bathhouse ABC's").

The voice tries to give confidence to a very shy Billy. He tries for the first time to approach a man (David), but this one disappears behind a door.
This leads the cast into a new scene and a new place in the bathhouse ("The Steamroom"), where each one tells to Billy that the steam is magical. When he decides to try to approach a guy, they all have disappeared.

The voice suggests that Billy first tries to make contact with boys through internet. Disgusted by the kinky ads he reads, Billy says he won't send a pic as a reply and that he just looks for someone to talk to ("Clickin' for dick").

The voice pushes Billy to make another attempt in the real world. He clumsily tries to seduce Teddy who says Billy is not his type. Billy exits and Teddy sings his love for bear-type men ("Bear Chaser").

From his room at the baths, Billy writes to another boy on the internet on a regular basis. His life changes when he stumbles upon Maurice who just had sex. Billy is conquered, while Maurice just tries to rush out with bad excuses. But Billy's now much more confident and reaches for Maurice's crotch. Maurice is immediately turned on. They start to dance as each one expresses his intentions : Maurice is a seducing guy in search for a one-night stand, Billy thinks he found the one ("Seduction Tango").

Billy goes on writing to his virtual friend. Everyone at the baths then checks out a beautiful guy. The voice reminds that "some men are just meant to be seen and left untouched". The cast bursts into a gospel song about these beautiful men that no one ever seems to land ("Hottie Revival").

Billy and Maurice go on meeting each other at the baths. When Billy says his parents are in town and suggest they should have dinner with them, Maurice decides to break up with him. He's helped by angel-Teddy and devil-David. As they exit, Billy sings a romantic torch song about his despair ("Lonely Love Song").

A depressed Billy ignores David, who tries to seduce him. David does not feel so much self-confident anymore and tells about the time he used to be fat, and how the gym at the bathhouse helped him become a well-built guy ("The Workout").

The characters then tell about their various experiences as gay men: Teddy reveals how he was drawn to understand that "penises are like snowflakes"; David tells about a former boyfriend who had an unusual foreskin; Maurice remembers a school friend who impressed everyone with his penis under the shower after sport practice; Teddy gives a conference about the "seven named penile shapes" that were identified by specialists, and Billy evokes a former boyfriend who used to be horny when he lied. And if you admit that "penis are like snowflakes, then every day is Christmas at the baths", and all four of them sing about gay sex and End-of-Year Festivities, parodying Christmas carols ("Penises are like Snowflakes / Christmas at the Baths").

The voice then suggests that one might find a "last package in the showers". The boys sing about the things they do there ("The Showers").

It's now New Year's Eve, and Billy is finally going to meet his internet friend, who appears to be Maurice. When they realize they have been opening their heart to each other for so long, they admit there is a special relationship between the two of them and they need each other ("Unlove Song"). Nevertheless, they know they don't love each other and that this could not lead them anywhere. Teddy and David count down the last seconds until the new year, then Billy and Maurice split up.

The voice invites Billy to take stock of the year that just ended: he may not have found the boy of his dreams, but he "found that [he] could find [him]self standing on [his] own". He is joined by the rest of the cast in a reprise of "Friendly Neighborhood Bathhouse".

== Musical numbers ==
- Friendly Neighborhood Bathhouse — Billy, David, Maurice & Teddy
- The Bathhouse ABC's — Maurice
- The Steamroom — Billy, David, Maurice & Teddy
- Clickin' for Dick — Billy, David, Maurice & Teddy
- Bear Chaser — Teddy
- Seduction Tango — Billy & Maurice
- Hottie Revival — Billy, David, Maurice & Teddy
- Lonely Love Song — Billy
- The Workout — David
- Penises are like Snowflakes / Christmas at the Baths — Billy, David, Maurice & Teddy
- In the Showers — Billy, David, Maurice & Teddy
- Unlove me — Billy & Maurice
- Bathhouse Finale — Billy, David, Maurice & Teddy

The segment that includes the songs "Penises are like Snowflakes" and "Christmas at the Baths" was not part of the original production of the play but was added later.

== Productions ==
=== 2006 Orlando ===
The original production of the show opened during Orlando International Fringe Theater Festival in May, 2006. It was then transferred to the Parliament House Footlight Theater in the same city from June 8 to July 15, where by popular demands two additional performances were added.
The cast featured Tim Evanicki as Billy and Karl Anderson as David alongside Kane Prestenback and Jerry Jobe Jr. The choreography was signed by Carl Anderson.

=== 2009 London Fringe Production ===
The UK premiere of the show opened at the Above the Stag Theatre on September 8 and ran through October 11, 2009. The cast consisted of Nic Gilder, Gary Fakes, Jon Harrison, Frank Loman, Craig O'Hara and Nicolas Sagar. The show was directed and choreographed by Tim McArthur. A new character, "Bathhouse Twink", appeared in this production of the musical.

=== 2010 Montreal ===
Davyn Ryall, artistic director of Village Scene Productions, announced the return of "Bathhouse: the Musical!" in Canada with "a new talented Canadian cast". He will direct the show, with additional coaching provided by Jacqueline Van de Geer.

=== 2011 Paris ===
The French production of Bathhouse: the Musical ! (translated into Sauna, le Musical) will have its premiere in early 2011. The show will be presented on September 14, 2010, during a showcase at the Vingtième Théâtre in Paris. The cast was revealed in June during a musicals-themed tea-dance party at Le Tango (boîte de nuit) in June, 2010. They performed "Bienvenue au Sauna" (literally "Welcome to the Bathhouse"), the French version of "Friendly Neighborhood Bathhouse". The musical will be directed by Nicolas Guilleminot and will feature Vincent Baillet (who is behind the project), François Borand, Grégory Garell and Julien Husser. The book and the lyrics will be adapted into French by Baptiste Delval. Johan Nus will choreograph the show.

=== 2014 London ===
Above The Stag Theatre, in its new Vauxhall venue, opened a second London production on 18 June 2014, directed by Tim McArthur, choreographed by Philip Aiden and designed by Andrew Beckett. The cast is Ryan Lynch, Tim McArthur, Alistair Frederick, Matthew Harper, Joe Leather and Royce Ullah, with recorded narration by Gyles Brandreth.

=== 2018 Montreal, Ottawa, Toronto ===
Davyn Ryall, artistic director of Village Scene Productions, announced the back by popular demand return of "Bathhouse: the Musical!" in Canada with "a Canada/Québec/US ensemble" featuring Douglas Connors, Nicholas Courcy, Marc Ducusin, Bryan Libero, and Austin Paz, under the musical direction of Ian Baird, with choreography by Nadia Verucci, costumes by Mélanie-Ann Fallnbigl.

This production is particularly interesting given the cast has been rehearsing the script in English and in French simultaneously in order to present the show in both of Canada's official languages during the Montreal leg of the run.

The Montreal shows (an official Montreal Pride event) were staged at Café Cléopâtre, the Ottawa (an official Capital Pride event) shows at Arts Court, and the Toronto shows at Buddies in Bad Times Theatre.

The opening nights in either official language in Montreal as well as in English in Ottawa served as fundraisers for HIV/AIDS service organisations.

== Critical response ==
The musical received very good reviews during its Orlando runs. Michael W. Freeman, reviewing the musical in Time Out, wrote that "the show is as much a really good comedy as it is a musical."; he added that "It has few aspirations beyond being an enjoyably silly diversion, and on those terms, it is a lot of fun. There's rich camp humor to spare because the performers demonstrate a great deal of talent in singing, dancing and being goofy."
Roger Moore from Orlando Sentinel defined it as "one of the can't-miss shows at this year's Fringe."

== Recordings ==
There is no official cast recording for Bathhouse: the Musical!. Nevertheless, the mySpace page of the show includes a dance-music remix of "Friendly Neighborhood Bathhouse" which includes several lines from the show.
