= Andrew Holleran =

American writer (born 1944)

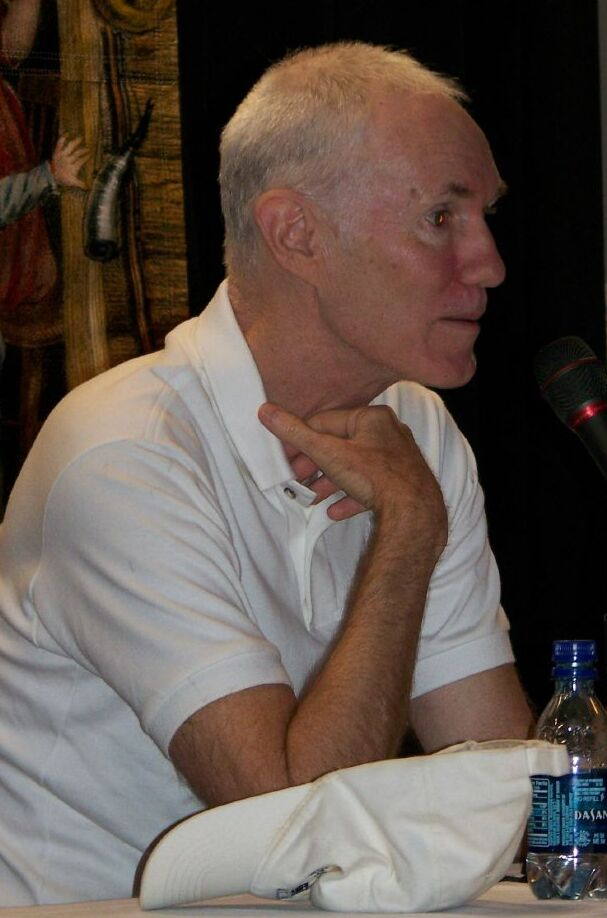
- Holleran, 2007
- Born: Eric Garber; 1944 (age 81–82); Aruba
- Education: University of Pennsylvania
- Alma mater: Harvard University (BA) University of Iowa (MA, MFA)
- Occupations: Novelist, essayist
- Writing career
- Notable works: Dancer from the Dance; Ground Zero
- Notable awards: Ferro-Grumley Award; Bill Whitehead Award; Stonewall Book Award

Andrew Holleran is the pseudonym of Eric Garber (born 1944), an American novelist, essayist, and short story writer, born on the island of Aruba. Most of his adult life has been spent in New York City, Washington, D.C., and a small town in Florida. Following the critical and financial success of his first novel Dancer from the Dance in 1978, he became a prominent author of post-Stonewall gay literature.

He is the only surviving member of the gay writer's group The Violet Quill. Historically protective of his privacy, the author continues to use the pseudonym Andrew Holleran as a writer and public speaker. Holleran is often considered to be among the most acclaimed voices in American gay literature. In 2015, gay writer Larry Kramer called him "our Fitzgerald and Hemingway, but for one thing: He writes better than both of them".

== Early life, education, military service ==
Holleran was born and spent much of his childhood on the island of Aruba in the Dutch Caribbean, where his father worked for an oil company. He was raised a Catholic. After his father retired, the family moved to a small town in northern Florida in 1961. After high school, he attended Harvard College, where he studied literature and American history. During his senior year, he met Peter Taylor, who taught creative writing. After graduating from Harvard with a BA in English in 1965, he followed Taylor to the University of Iowa Writers' Workshop, in part to postpone "the horror of law school."

At Iowa, where Holleran's teachers included Kurt Vonnegut and José Donoso, he formed a long-lasting friendship with fellow student Robert Ferro. None of Holleran's writings from this period were ever published, but he did obtain both an MA and an MFA from Iowa. Then, after one year at the University of Pennsylvania Law School, which he found "a drag," in 1968 Holleran found himself "in the clutches of a Kafkaesque nightmare" when he was drafted into the U.S. Army at the height of the Vietnam War. A "fluke of the computer system" sent him not to Vietnam but to West Germany. While in Germany he made his first sale of a short story, to The New Yorker. It was also in Germany that he had his first experience of gay sex, which he recounted in a Christopher Street interview:

One night I was in an N.C.O. club with this mad queen from Boston...He got me drunk and put me on the train to Ludwigshafen and dragged me to my first gay bar. It was stunning...I had sex that night and came back to the post so depressed that I took a three-hour-long shower. I felt that I had violated myself...After that experience in Germany I went back into the closet for a year.

== Move to New York City ==
Following his return to the United States after serving in the army, Holleran attended one additional semester of law school in Philadelphia, where by chance one night he discovered the gay part of town and developed a "case of 'Every Night Fever'" that "went on for four or five years. Bars seemed to be the most wonderful places on earth. I just had to walk into one to be in heaven. I would stand for hours. I was very shy and everyone seemed so glamorous." After dropping out of law school and moving to New York City, his "fever" only intensified with his discovery of gay dance clubs and bathhouses and the gay scene at Cherry Grove and Fire Island Pines. When not at a gym or out partying, dancing, and cruising for sex, he lived "in roach-infested apartments, working as a bartender, as a typist." He continued to write, thinking, after the appearance of his story in The New Yorker in 1971, that "they would publish me three times a year," but instead, "I had nothing published for seven years after that, until Dancer from the Dance," in 1978. "It's been a terrible struggle," he recalled.

Dancer from the Dance was a critical success, became a national bestseller, and launched Holleran's career as a writer. His subsequent, increasingly autobiographical novels, short stories, and essays reflect his concerns as an aging gay man and track his movements between homes in New York City, Washington, D.C., and the small town in Florida where his parents retired and where he continues to live.

Holleran was part of The Violet Quill, a prominent post-stonewall gay writer's group that met in 1980 and 1981 and included Christopher Cox, Robert Ferro, Michael Grumley, Felice Picano, Edmund White, and George Whitmore. Since the deaths of Picano and White in 2025, Holleran is the sole surviving member.

== Literary career ==
=== Dancer from the Dance ===
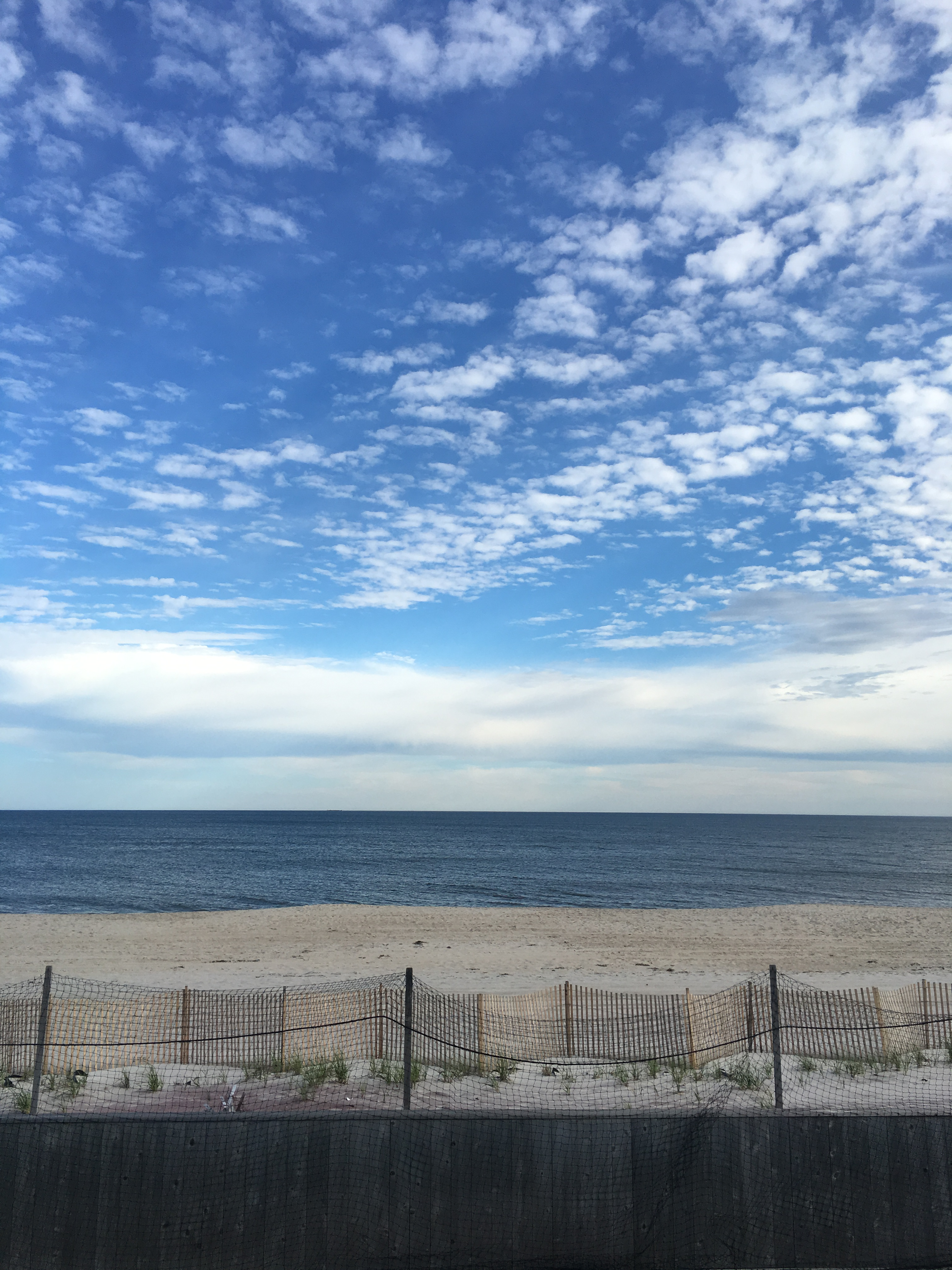
The beach at Fire Island Pines, an important location in Dancer from the Dance.

Dancer from the Dance (1978) takes place amid discotheques, gay bathhouses, fabulous parties, and seedy apartments in New York City and Fire Island. John Lahr in The New York Times called it

A meditation on ecstasy...constructed as a memoir of one very special member of this world: Malone, a paradigm of the romantic ideal...Malone becomes a circuit queen, but an aura of innocence not odium surrounds him. His delirium becomes a kind of saintliness; he gives love to the ugly as well as the beautiful...The Virgil who leads Malone through this inferno is an outrageous transvestite called Sutherland. Where Malone is beautiful, Sutherland is wise...And as we get to know this wonderful character, we see how his frivolity is a rebellion against the meaningless he finds around him.

The same review included a caustic dismissal of Larry Kramer's novel Faggots, set in the same milieu of gay New York and Fire Island, calling it, "sentence for sentence, some of the worst writing I've encountered in a published manuscript...an embarrassing fiasco." The two novels would continue to be linked and compared by readers and critics. Bill Goldstein in The New York Times in 2006 called the books "remarkably similar" in "erotic and pharmacological particulars, with Mr. Kramer channeling Theodore Dreiser or Upton Sinclair to Mr. Holleran's [F. Scott] Fitzgerald."

Dancer from the Dance became a breakthrough bestseller and is regarded as a classic of gay literature, enjoying a cult status in the gay community. William Johnson, program director of PEN America and former deputy director of Lambda Literary, calls Dancer from the Dance "our Catcher in the Rye, the book you read when you're young." Michael Cunningham calls it "the first gay novel everybody read...the first Big Gay Literary Sensation."

In 1983, after a fall rendered his mother an invalid, he began living full-time in Florida, but kept a rent-controlled apartment on St. Mark's Place in the East Village.

=== Nights in Aruba ===
Holleran's second novel, Nights in Aruba (1983), drew on his childhood in Aruba, his experience in the U.S. Army in Germany, his love-life and friendships in New York, and his ongoing relationships with his sister in Pennsylvania and his parents in Florida. The novel is not entirely autobiographical. One of the most vivid characters is "a tart-tongued older queen named Mister Friel"; Holleran says, "I took the greatest pleasure in the Friel sections, which were totally made up." (Mister Friel reappears in the short story "The Hamburger Man" in In September, the Light Changes.)

=== Ground Zero ===
Ground Zero (1988) presented a collection of Holleran's essays, originally published in Christopher Street, written as the AIDS epidemic struck New York and decimated its gay community. A quarter-century after its publication, Garth Greenwell in The New Yorker assessed it as "one of the most important books to emerge from the plague," and wrote:

The essays combine journalistic reportage in real time with an extraordinarily refined literary sensibility, and the conjunction is startling. As Holleran, along with the rest of gay New York, slowly realizes the scope of the catastrophe, the effect is something like reading F. Scott Fitzgerald's notes on the apocalypse.

Among the essays is Holleran's reflection on Charles Ludlam, which Greenwell calls "the most concise and profound discussion of camp aesthetics I know."

=== The Beauty of Men ===
In his third novel, The Beauty of Men (1996), a 47-year-old gay man living in a small town in Florida visits his quadriplegic mother at a nursing home in nearby Gainesville, remembers his friends in New York—most of them dead from AIDS—and agonizes over an unrequited obsession with a younger gay man. Peter Parker in The New York Times found it "extremely well written, and in its muted way an altogether more impressive novel than Dancer From the Dance." Alan Hollinghurst called it a "beautiful and desolating tally of what makes up a life, what images and obsessions and childlike hungers, beyond anything that it is respectable or usual to admit, haunt it and impel it and obstruct it." The novel received the 1996 Ferro-Grumley Award.

=== In September, the Light Changes ===
In September, the Light Changes (1999) was a collection of short stories, most of them published for the first time. Peter Parker in The New York Times called the book "unflinching, provocative, witty and shrewd."

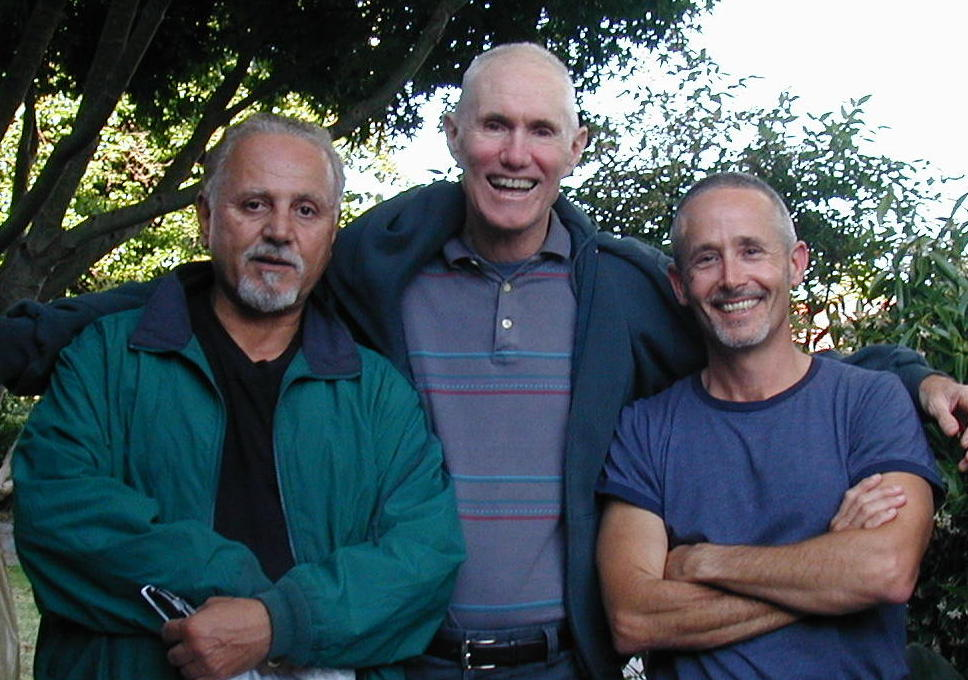
Andrew Holleran (center) and Felice Picano (left) at the home of Steven Saylor (right) in Berkeley, California, July 4, 2006.

=== Grief ===
After the death of his mother, Holleran taught creative writing at American University in Washington, D.C. at the invitation of longtime friend and colleague Richard McCann. Holleran's grief at his mother's death in Florida, his observations on Washington and its gay residents, together with a meditation on the letters of Mary Todd Lincoln, inform his short novel Grief (2006). Elizabeth Hand was struck by Holleran's evocation of the city: "Like Cavafy leading one through the alleys and restaurants and history of Alexandria, Egypt, Holleran's narrator is a guide to the labyrinth of ambition, death, art and desire that lies within L'Enfant's carefully executed grid of streets and parks."

Grief received the 2007 Stonewall Book Award. Also in 2007, Holleran received the Bill Whitehead Award for Lifetime Achievement from Publishing Triangle.

=== The Kingdom of Sand ===
While Holleran continued to publish essays and short stories, it was not until 2022 that his next novel appeared, The Kingdom of Sand, a "story...about the things we accumulate during a lifetime but cannot bear to part with before we die." The setting is again a small Florida town, and the narrator is again an aging gay man, living in the house where his late parents retired, making "their bedroom into a temple" and keeping

all their possessions, undisturbed—the clothes in their closet, my mother's gowns, the madras shirts my father had bought long after he'd gotten so old they were too beautiful for his wizened face, the package of Pall Mall cigarettes he had left in the refrigerator; all of their liquor, my mother's bottles of perfume, a picture of my mother in a red high-necked dress, looking Victorian in a small oval golden frame set between a crystal statue of the Virgin Mary and a bottle of Chanel No. 5.

The narrator recounts his visits with Earl, an older gay man in town who is approaching death and in some ways takes the place of his father; but because Earl is gay, "I could talk to him in a way I could not my father." Reviewing The Kingdom of Sand in The New York Times, Colm Tóibín wrote that Holleran, "at almost 80 years of age...has produced a novel remarkable for its integrity, for its readiness to embrace difficult truths and for its complex way of paying homage to the passing of time."

=== Essays and letters ===
Holleran has been a prolific essayist throughout his career. (His essays and fiction are both so autobiographical and introspective that they sometimes seem indistinguishable.) For many years he wrote regularly for the groundbreaking gay magazine Christopher Street. More recently, he has been a frequent contributor to The Gay & Lesbian Review Worldwide.

Holleran is also known as a prolific writer of letters. A selection of his early correspondence with Robert Ferro was published in The Violet Quill Reader in 1994. Having earlier written to Ferro about his awed reaction to Proust's Remembrance of Things Past, Holleran (not yet a published novelist) ends a letter from 1970 by writing:

Incidentally I have begun to think that novels may be mere excuses for publishing of letters; having read now Proust to his mother, Proust to Antoine Bibesco, John Addington Symonds to everyone, and who else...But novels are such work. There must be an easier way to have one's letters published.

== Influences ==
Holleran has called The Great Gatsby "my favorite book." He still owns the "well-worn paperback" he "had to read in high school." When asked "Who are your models as a writer?" in a 1983 interview, Holleran replied,

Scott Fitzgerald. I think Gatsby is just it for language and the beauty of the prose, and Tender Is the Night. And I love Proust. But he's the dangerous one. He's so overwhelming, so immense, so brilliant on so many levels that that book is stultifying in a way. It stands like this enormous mountain, and you can't go up it. You have to go around it."

Recalling Dancer from the Dance, with its "twilit languor and ambered nostalgia," Garth Greenwell in The New Yorker noted that "Holleran's clearest influences are Fitzgerald and Proust." Edmund White wrote that Dancer "accomplished for the 1970s what The Great Gatsby achieved for the 1920s—the glamorization of a decade and a culture."

Tony Kushner also links Holleran and Fitzgerald:

Fitzgerald is also a writer about loss; there's this sense with both [Holleran and Fitzgerald] of people inhabiting something that's already disappeared. One of the first things I remember about Dancer from the Dance is that it lands on the notion that all of us are self-invented people, and that behind that is a difficult and somewhat concealed past, as if in coming out there's a reverse closeting that's very Fitzgeraldian."

Another influence is "Henry James, who hovers as a tutelary spirit over much of his work."

== Recurring themes and elements ==
In 2022, looking back over Holleran's 44-year career, Garth Greenwell in The New Yorker noted that, after the "uniquely novelistic" Dancer from the Dance, Holleran's subsequent books

can most profitably be read as a sustained study of one man's life. Though the protagonists are sometimes granted different names...the major facts of their biographies are largely constant, and shared with their author: a devout Catholic childhood on a Caribbean island; military service and initiation into gay life in Heidelberg; young adulthood in New York, where the thrill of sexual freedom competed with anxiety about possibly wasting one's life; then a mostly closeted small-town existence, caring for a disabled parent, and crushing grief after that parent's death. Incidents, scenes, even lines of dialogue drift between the books, and certain events take on a totemic force: a roommate's suicide; a father calling out after suffering a stroke; a mother asking her adult son if he is gay and the son's panicked denial.

A notable exception to this assessment is In September, the Light Changes (1999), in which many of the short stories are less essay-like and autobiographical, and more traditionally fictional and in the vein of Dancer from the Dance than Holleran's subsequent novels.

== Critical reception ==
In a positive review of Holleran's Grief in The New York Times in 2006, Caryn James wrote that "Holleran's earlier novels can seem so determined to speak for their disenfranchised gay characters that the works become inaccessible to anyone else, like looking through a window at someone else's world."

Quoting Caryn James, in 2015 Larry Kramer took the critical establishment to task, calling Holleran

the best gay writer we have today...If he were straight, his reputation would be immense. The beauty of his language, the empathy for his characters and the world he writes about, are unsurpassed by any other gay writing of our time...He is our Fitzgerald and Hemingway but for one thing: He writes better than both of them...When we fall into the hands of book critics at The Times, we are amazed at their lack of understanding and empathy of what we are trying to do and say. It is quite amazing how fervent and omnipresent is the homophobia that never-endingly remains the norm for gay writers in their book reviews.

Asked by New York Magazine to name her "favorite underrated book of the past ten years," Daphne Merkin cited Grief, and, like Kramer, said that Holleran's work is under-appreciated:

This slim but singularly affecting novel put in an appearance to conditional praise last June and, to my knowledge, sank thereafter without a trace. A meditation on personal loss and the loss of erotic/romantic possibilities for aging homosexual men (and by implication all aging people) it's bone-spare but plangent with meaning—the kind of novel that would be immediately hailed if it were written by a laconic European writer.

Explicitly acknowledging Kramer's complaint from 2015, with the publication of The Kingdom of Sand in 2022 Joshua Barone in The New York Times wrote a lengthy profile and appreciation of Holleran, accompanied by photographs of the novelist in the natural habitat of the small town in Florida that is so often the setting of his works.

== Works ==
=== Fiction ===
- "The Holy Family" (short story, The New Yorker, January 2, 1971)
- Dancer from the Dance (novel, 1978)
- Nights in Aruba (novel, 1983)
- "A House Divided" (short story, First Love/Last Love: New Fiction from Christopher Street, 1985)
- "Friends at Evening" (short story, Men on Men: Best New Gay Fiction, 1986)
- "Lights in the Valley" (short story, Men on Men 3, 1990)
- "Sleeping Soldiers" (short story, The Violet Quill Reader, 1994)
- The Beauty of Men (novel, 1996)
- In September, the Light Changes (short stories, 1999)
- "The Incontinents" (short story, M2M: New Literary Fiction, 2003)
- Grief (novel, 2006)
- "There's a Small Hotel" (short story, Granta 124, August 2, 2013)
- The Kingdom of Sand (novel, 2022)

=== Nonfiction (collections and anthologies) ===
- "Nipples" (essay, Aphrodisiac: Fiction from Christopher Street, 1980)
- "Introduction" (The Normal Heart by Larry Kramer, 1985)
- Ground Zero (essays, 1988)
- "Fire Island, New York" (essay, Hometowns: Gay Men Write About Where They Belong, 1991)
- "'Mmmmpfgh'" (essay, Flesh and the Word, 1992)
- "My Uncle, Sitting Beneath the Tree" (essay, A Member of the Family: Gay Men Write About Their Families, 1992)
- "Afterword" (Men on Men 4), 1992)
- "Herzschmerz" (essay, Flesh and the Word 2, 1993)
- "Early Correspondence of Andrew Holleran and Robert Ferro" (letters, The Violet Quill Reader, 1994)
- "Dark Disco: A Lament" and "A Place of Their Own" (essays, The Violet Quill Reader, 1994)
- "Preston" (essay, Looking for Mr. Preston, 1995)
- "Friends" (essay, Friends and Lovers: Gay Men Write About the Families They Create, 1995)
- "The Sex Vacation" (essay, Flesh and the Word 3, 1995)
- "The Sense of Sin" (essay, Wrestling with the Angel: Faith and Religion in the Lives of Gay Men 1995)
- "Larry and the Wall of Books" (essay, We Must Love One Another or Die: The Life and Legacies of Larry Kramer, 1997)
- "Introduction" (Fresh Men 2: New Voices in Gay Fiction, 2005)
- Chronicle of a Plague, Revisited: AIDS and Its Aftermath (reissue of Ground Zero with ten additional essays and a new introduction, 2008)
- "My Father and Myself (1968) by J.R. Ackerley" (essay, 50 Gay and Lesbian Books that Everybody Must Read, 2009)
- "The Magic Mountain" (essay, The Brokeback Book: From Story to Cultural Phenomenon, 2011)

== Sources ==
- Barone, Joshua (2022). "Andrew Holleran's Work Has Traced the Arc of Life. Now, He Takes on Death", The New York Times, June 6, 2022, Section C, p. 1.
- Bergman, David, editor (1994). The Violet Quill Reader: The Emergence of Gay Writing after Stonewall, New York: St. Martin's Press, 1994.
- Cunningham, Michael (2018). "How the Early '80s Changed Gay Writing Forever", The New York Times Style Magazine, April 16, 2018.
- Gambone, Philip (1999) "Andrew Holleran" (1993 interview), Something Inside: Conversations with Gay Fiction Writers, Madison: University of Wisconsin Press, 1999.
- Goldstein, Bill (2006). "Writer of Gay Classic Evokes Mrs. Lincoln", The New York Times, June 3, 2006.
- Greenwell, Garth (2020). "Chronicle of a Plague, Revisited and the Inner Life of Catastrophe", The New Yorker, April 15, 2020.
- Greenwell, Garth (2022). "Andrew Holleran Chronicles Life after Catastrophe", The New Yorker, June 6, 2022.
- Hand, Elizabeth (2006). "The District of Sorrow", Washington Post, July 2, 2006.
- Holleran, Andrew (2012). "My Harvard, Part 2: New York", The Gay & Lesbian Review Worldwide, November 1, 2012.
- Holleran, Andrew (2022). The Kingdom of Sand, New York: Farrar, Straus and Giroux, 2022.
- Hollinghurst, Alan (1996). "'So I'm Shallow'", The New York Times, June 30, 1996, Section 7, Page 1.
- James, Caryn (2006). "Solitary Man", The New York Times, July 30, 2006, Section 7, p. 17.
- Kramer, Larry (2015). "Guest Column: Larry Kramer's Sour Times", originally published in Paper, October 20, 2015.
- Lahr, John (1979). "Camp Tales", The New York Times, January 14, 1979, Section SM, p. 24.
- Mahtani, Sahil K. (2006). "The Men of Lamont: Come out, come out, wherever you are", The Harvard Crimson, November 18, 2006.
- Ortleb, Charles. "An Interview with Andrew Holleran," Christopher Street, July 1978, pp. 53–56.
- Parker, Peter (1999). "The Party's Over", The New York Times, July 25, 1999, Section 7, p. 25.
- Strobel, Christina (1995). "Andrew Holleran" (interview) in American Contradictions: Interviews with Nine American Writers, edited by Wolfgang Binder and Helmgrecht Breinig, Hanover, NH: Wesleyan University Press, 1995.
- Tóibín, Colm (2022). "The Problem With Surviving? The Next 30 Years. In Florida." The New York Times, Sunday Book Review, July 10, 2022, p. 9.
- White, Edmund (1991). "Out of the Closet, Onto the Bookshelf", The New York Times, June 16, 1991, Section 6, p. 22.
