= Gay bathhouse =

Commercial space for male-male sex

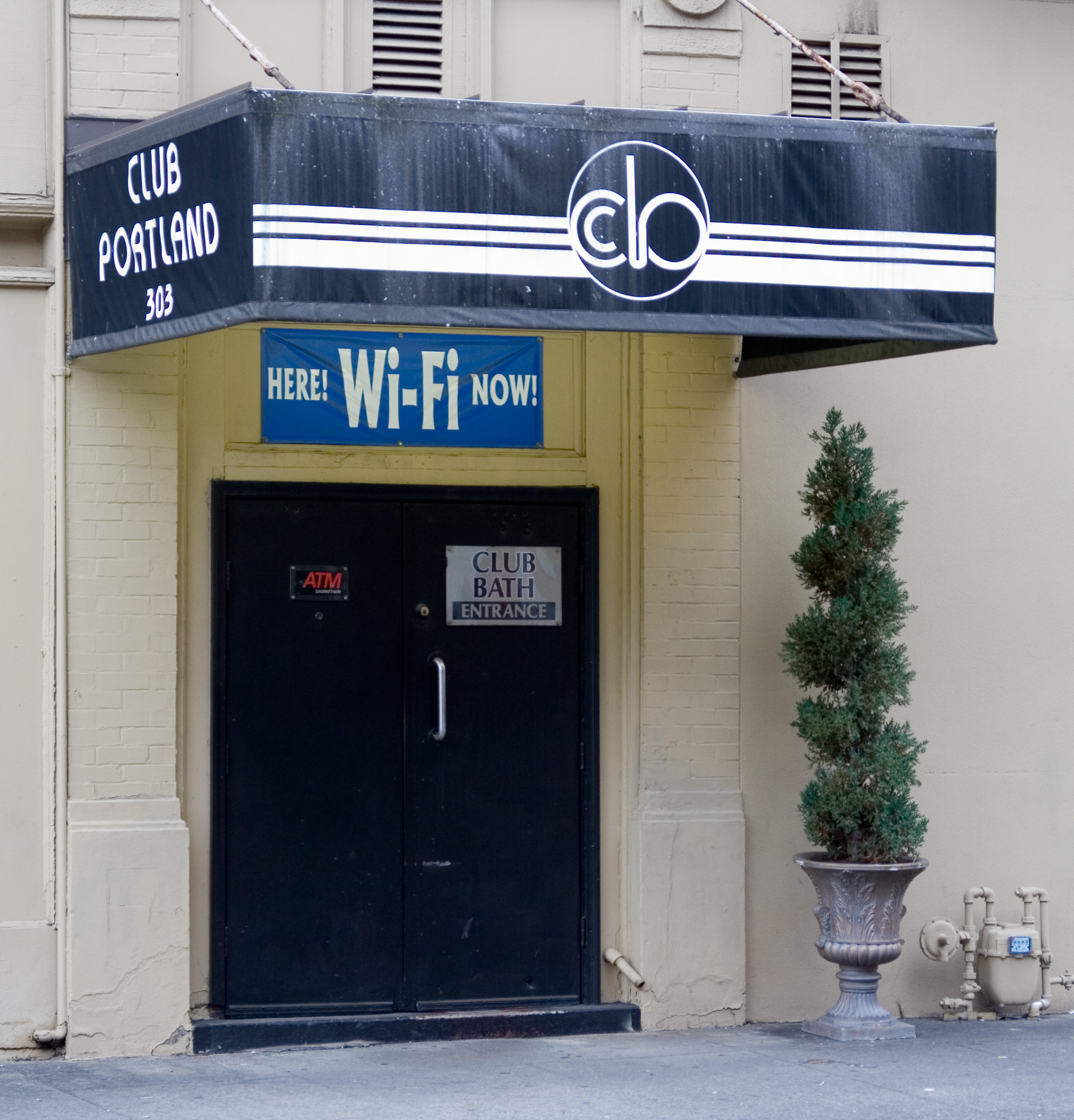
Club Portland, a now defunct gay bathhouse in Portland, Oregon

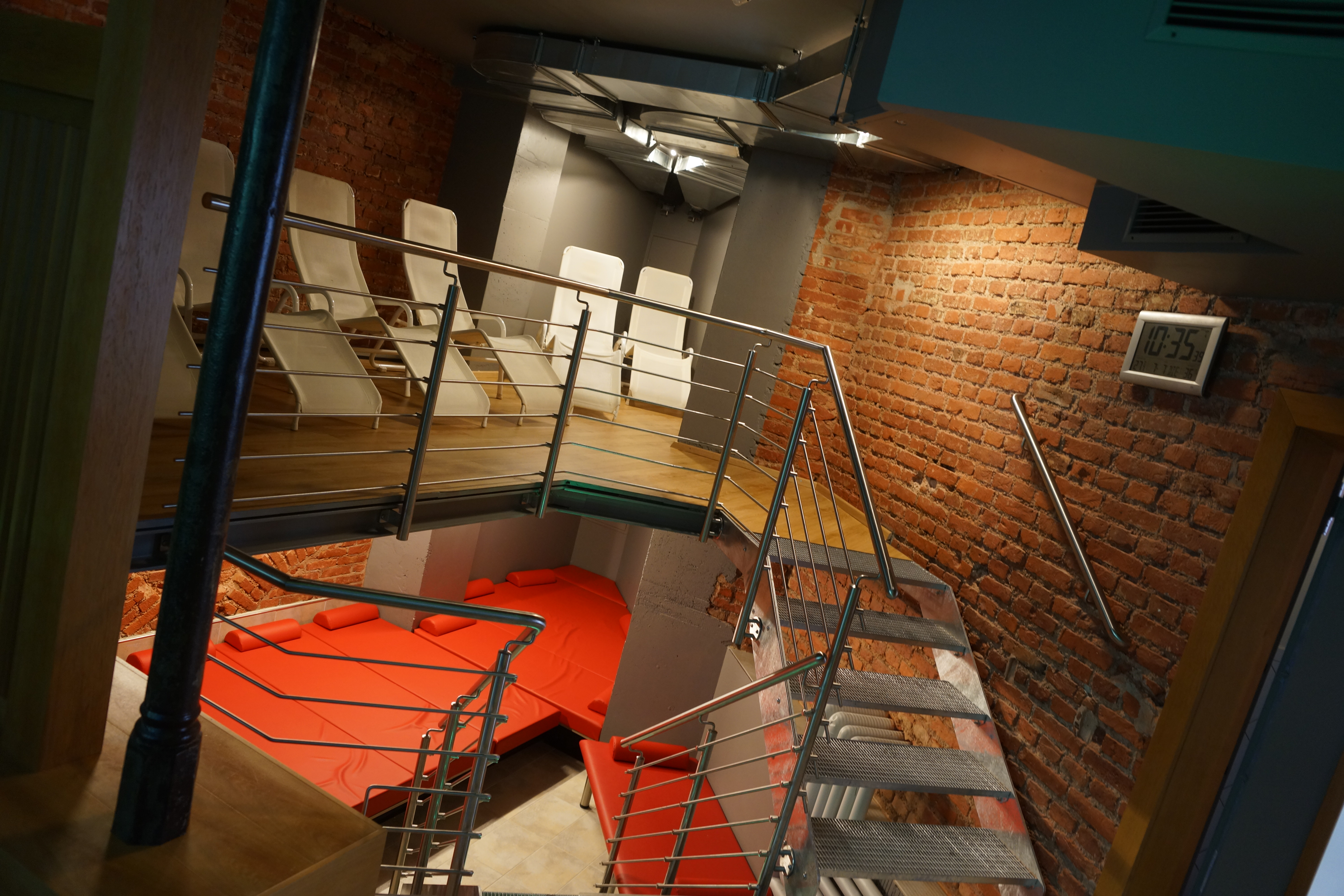
Deutsche Eiche, (lit. 'German Oak') in Munich

A gay bathhouse, also known as a gay sauna or a gay steambath, is a public bath targeted towards gay and bisexual men. In gay slang, a bathhouse may be called just "the baths", "the sauna", or "the tubs". Historically, they have been used for sexual activity.

Bathhouses offering similar services for women are rare, but some men's bathhouses occasionally have a "lesbian" or "women only" night. Some, such as Hawks PDX, offer so-called "bisexual" nights, where anyone is welcome regardless of gender.

Gay bathhouses differentiate themselves from similar gay sex clubs or gay bar darkrooms by offering communal and/or individual water facilities (and thus, a more sanitary experience).

Bathhouses vary considerably in size and amenities—from small establishments with 10 or 20 rooms and a handful of lockers to multi-story saunas with a variety of room styles or sizes and several steam baths, hot tubs, and sometimes swimming pools and private outdoor facilities. Most have a steam room (or wet sauna), dry sauna, showers, lockers, and small private rooms.

Different cultures emphasize different uses of a gay bathhouse. In Asia, nearly every gay sauna includes a communal karaoke room complete with handheld microphones and large selections of songs for their toweled patrons. In Northern Europe, there are often small cafes or even restaurants offering full meals within a gay bathhouse. In North America, many gay bathhouses include a large dedicated gym area with weights and exercise machines.

In many countries, bathhouses are "membership only" (for legal reasons); though membership is generally open to anyone over the age of consent who seeks it, usually after paying a small fee. Unlike brothels, customers at gay bathhouses in the U.S. pay only for the use of the facilities. Sexual activity, if it occurs, is not provided by staff of the establishment, but is between customers with no money exchanged. Many gay bathhouses in the U.S., for legal reasons, explicitly prohibit and/or discourage prostitution and ban known sex workers.

In other countries (notably Thailand and Brazil), bathhouses may employ male sex workers to work directly on site. Their availability may be blatant (patrons choose a numbered male who is viewable behind a partition), or subtle (male sex workers may wear a towel and mix in as a general patron, but when approached will clarify they are solely "for rent".) These men for hire may have access to private rooms in the establishment that are otherwise off-limits to general guests. Sex fees are typically set by the management, although tipping is encouraged. Private session lengths and costs may be tallied up as "per song" playing overhead on the bathhouse's audio system. Since true male-only brothels are rarely found anywhere in the world, gay bathhouses sometimes also act as this hybrid model. However, unlike an actual brothel, patrons can choose to solely have sex with each other for free (without paying anything in addition to the price at the door).

== History ==
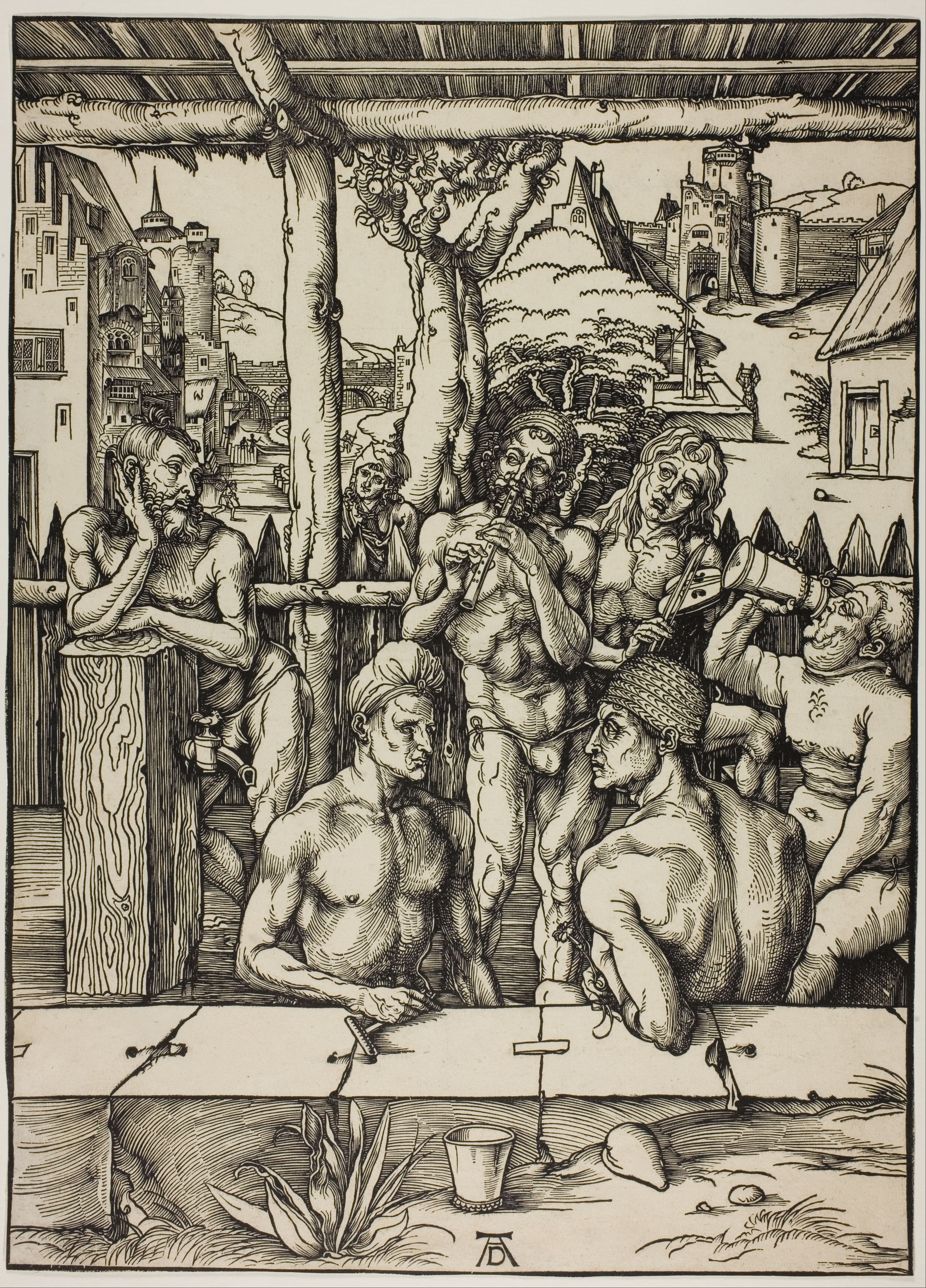
Albrecht Dürer, The Men's Bath, c. 1496–1497

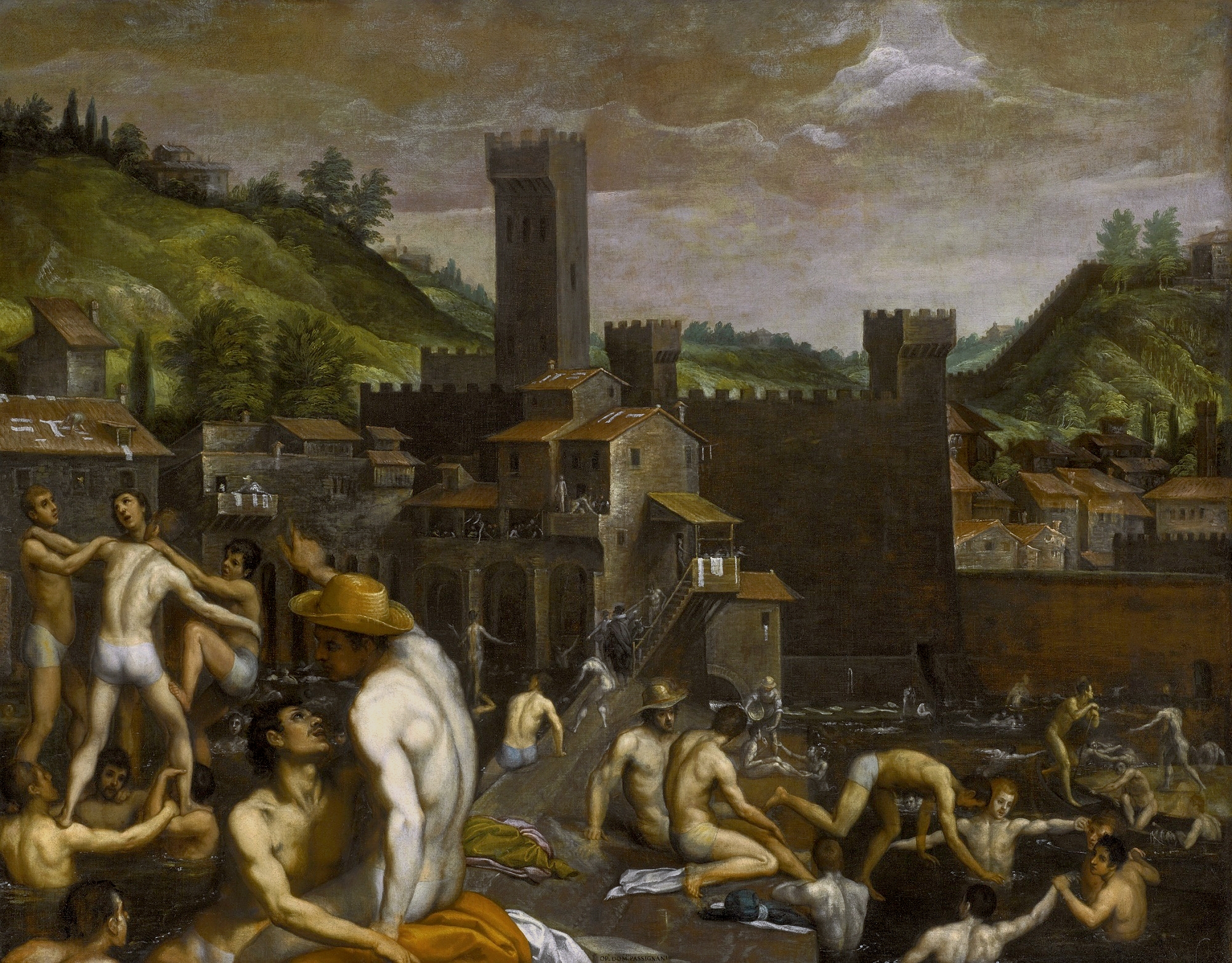
Domenico Cresti, Bathers at San Niccolò, 1600

Gay saunas have become important safe locations for men to meet and explore their sexuality, according to the LGBTQ+ community. These establishments first appeared in large European cities in the early 20th century, providing undercover and remote settings for same-sex interactions at a time when homosexuality was strongly stigmatized and illegal. A tradition of public baths dates back to the 6th century BCE, and there are many ancient records of homosexual activity in Greece. In the West, gay men have been using bathhouses for sex since at least the late 19th and early 20th centuries, a time when homosexual acts were illegal in most Western countries and men who were caught engaging in homosexual acts were often arrested and publicly humiliated. Men began frequenting cruising areas such as bathhouses, public parks, alleys, train and bus stations, adult theaters, public lavatories (cottages or tearooms), and gym changing rooms where they could meet other men for sex. Some bathhouse owners tried to prevent sex among patrons while others, mindful of profits or prepared to risk prosecution, overlooked discreet homosexual activity.

=== Early records ===
1492 Florence
In Florence, Italy, in 1492 there was a purge against the "vice of sodomy". The places used for homosexual acts were taverns, baths, and casini (sheds or houses used for illicit sex and gambling). The Eight of Watch (the city's leading criminal court) issued several decrees associated with sodomy, and on April 11, 1492, it warned the managers of bathhouses to keep out "suspect boys" on penalty of a fine. In the short period from April 1492 to February 1494, it convicted 44 men for homosexual relations not involving violence or aggravating circumstances.
1876 Paris
In France the first recorded police raid on a Parisian bathhouse was in 1876 in the Bains de Gymnase on the Rue du Faubourg-Poissonnière. Six men aged 14 to 22 were prosecuted for an "offence against public decency" and the manager and two employees for "facilitating pederasty".
1903 New York
In the United States on February 21, 1903, New York police conducted the first recorded raid on a gay bathhouse, the Ariston Hotel Baths. 26 men were arrested, and 12 brought to trial on sodomy charges; seven men received sentences ranging from four to 20 years in prison.

=== Early gay bathhouses ===
In New York City, the Everard (nicknamed "the Everhard") was converted from a church to a bathhouse in 1888 and was patronized by gay men before the 1920s and by the 1930s had a reputation as the "classiest, safest, and best known of the baths". It was damaged by fire on May 25, 1977, when nine men died and several others were seriously injured. The Everard closed in 1986. Also popular in the 1910s were the Produce Exchange Baths and the Lafayette Baths (403–405 Lafayette Street, which from 1916 was managed by Ira & George Gershwin). American precisionist painter Charles Demuth used the Lafayette Baths as his favorite haunt. His 1918 homoerotic self-portrait set in a Victorian Turkish bath is likely to have been inspired by it. The Penn Post Baths in a hotel basement (the Penn Post Hotel, 304 West 31st Street) was a popular gay location in the 1920s despite a seedy condition and the lack of private rooms.

The American composer Charles Griffes (1884–1920) wrote in his diaries about visits to New York City bathhouses and the YMCA. His biography states: "So great was his need to be with boys, that though his home contained two pianos, he chose to practice at an instrument at the Y, and his favourite time was when the players were coming and going from their games."

When a friend with "little experience but great desire" confided his homosexual longings to Charles Griffes in 1916, Griffes took him to the Lafayette so that he could meet other gay men and explore his sexual interests in a supportive environment: the friend was "astounded and fascinated" by what he saw there. The baths also encouraged more advanced forms of sexual experimentation. Griffes himself had had his first encounter with a man interested in sadomasochism at the Lafayette two years earlier (he found the man "interesting" but the experience unappealing), and several men interviewed in the mid-1930s referred to experimenting in the baths and learning of new pleasures.

— George Chauncey, Gay New York, 1995

In London, the Savoy Victorian-style Turkish Baths at 92 Jermyn Street became a favorite spot (opening in 1910 and remaining open until September 1975). The journalist A.J. Langguth wrote: "...[The baths at 92 Jermyn Street] represented a twilight arena for elderly men who came to sweat poisons from their systems and youths who came to strike beguiling poses in Turkish towels... although they were closely overseen by attendants, they provided a discreet place to inspect a young man before offering a cup of tea at Lyons." Regulars included Rock Hudson.

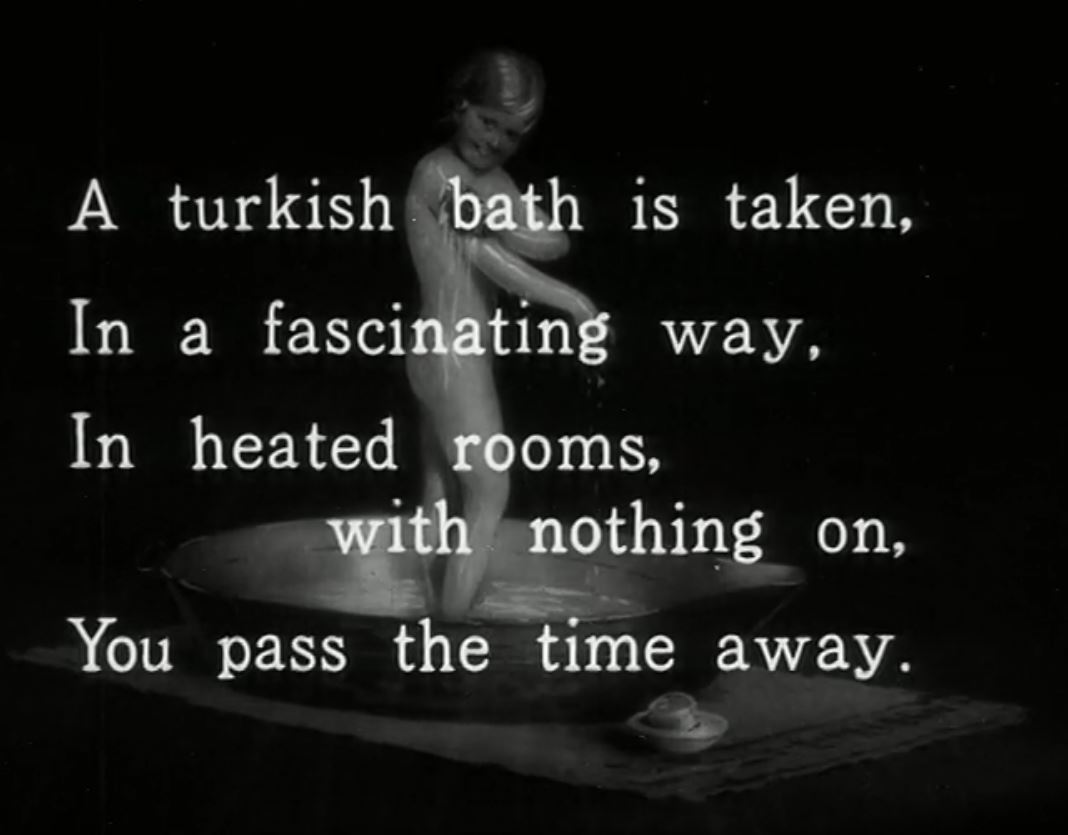
A still from 'Where there's life there's soap', a 1933 film about cleanliness aimed at younger audiences, made by Bermondsey Council describing their Victorian-style Turkish baths opened in 1927.

In the 1950s, Bermondsey's Victorian-style Turkish Baths were rated by Kenneth Williams as "quite fabulous" in his diaries.

Steambaths in the 1930s: The steambaths that had been well known to me were those of East Ham, Greenwich and Bermondsey. In the first two it was frequently possible to indulge in what the Spartacus Guide coyly describes as 'action', but behaviour at all times had to be reasonably cautious. In the Grange Road baths in Bermondsey, however, all restraint could immediately be discarded with the small towels provided to cover your nakedness."

— Anthony Aspinall, Gay Times

=== Modern gay bathhouses ===
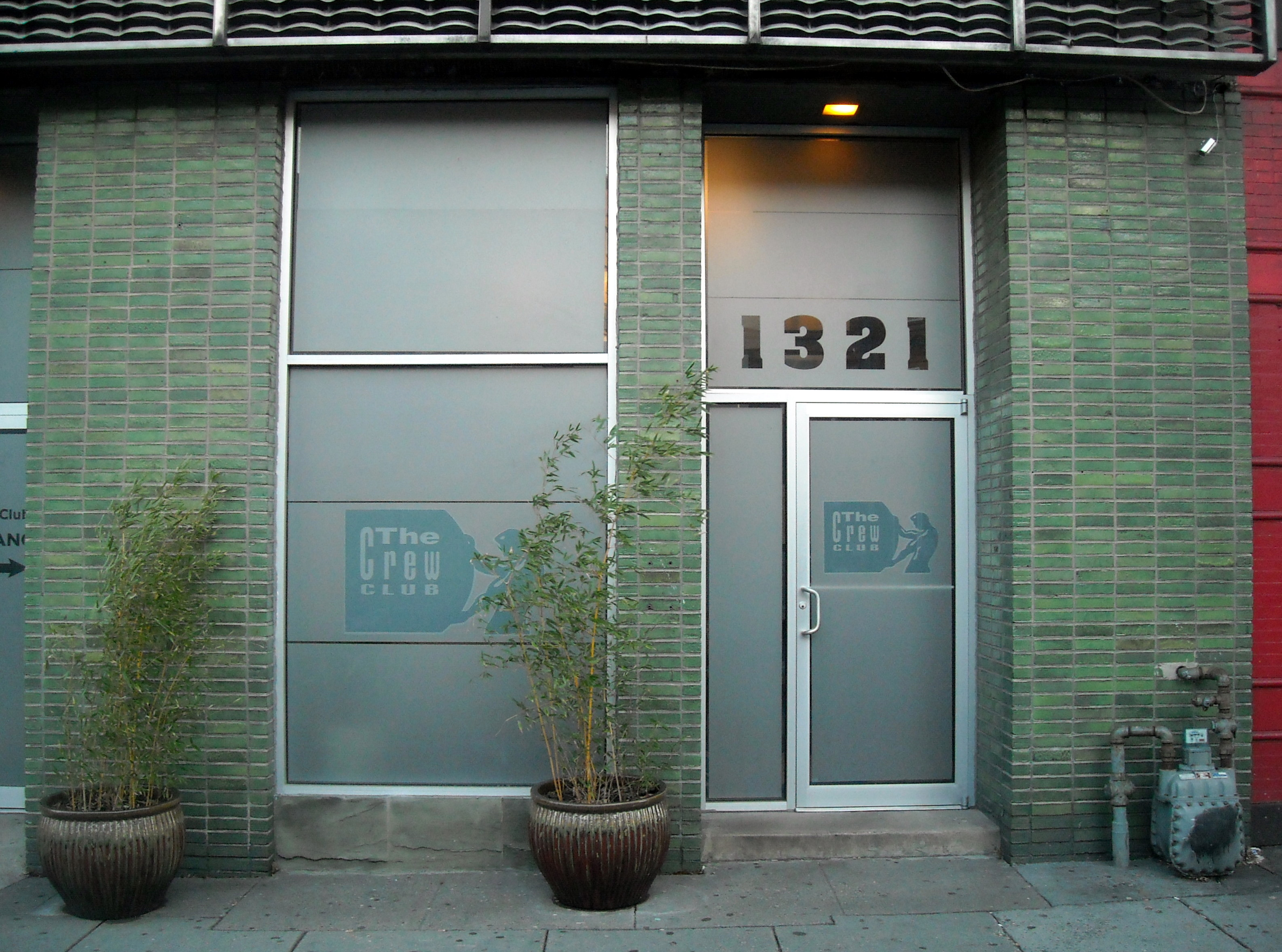
Crew Club, in the Logan Circle neighborhood of Washington, D.C.

In the 1950s, exclusively gay bathhouses began to open in the United States. Though subject to vice raids, these bathhouses were "oases of homosexual camaraderie" and were, as they remain today, "places where it was safe to be gay", whether or not patrons themselves identified as homosexual. The gay baths offered a much safer alternative to sex in other public places.

In the late 1960s and 1970s, gay bathhouses—now primarily gay-owned and operated—became fully licensed gay establishments which soon became major gay institutions. These bathhouses served as informal gay meeting places, places where friends could meet, relax and have sex. Gay bathhouses frequently threw parties for Pride Day and were usually open, and busy, on public holidays such as Thanksgiving and Christmas, when some gay men, particularly those who had been rejected by their families due to their sexual orientation, had nowhere else to go. The American writer Truman Capote was a regular at New York City baths in the 1970s, in particular the sauna at West 58th Street.

Another service offered by the baths was voter registration. In the run-up to the 1980 election, the New St. Mark's Baths in New York City, with the assistance of the League of Women Voters, conducted a voter registration drive on its premises.

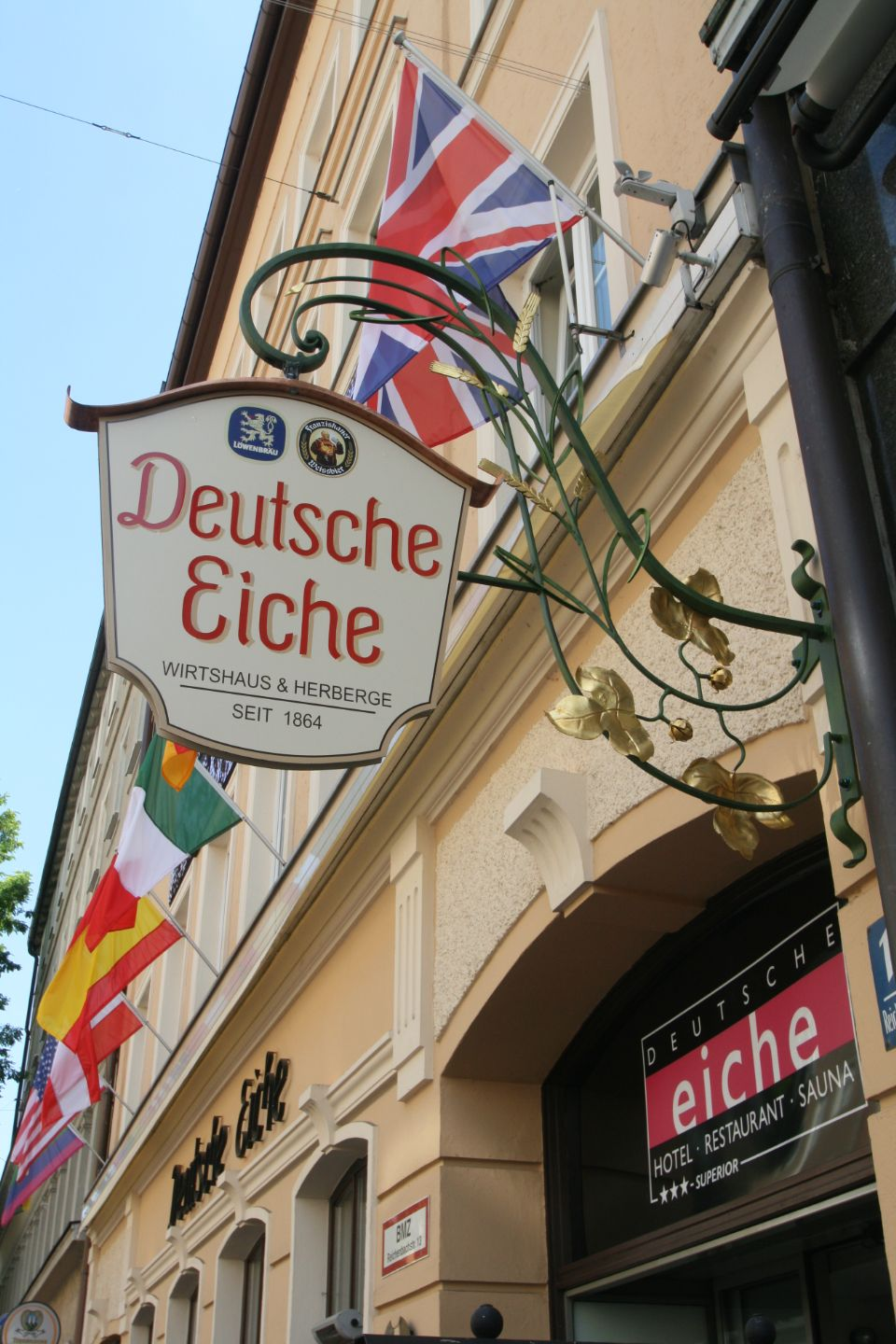
Deutsche Eiche, Munich, 2008

In Australia, the first gay steam bath was opened in Sydney in 1967. This was the Bondi Junction Steam Baths at 109 Oxford Street. From 1972 through 1977 the following gay steam baths opened: Ken's Karate Klub (nicknamed "KKK"), later called Ken's at Kensington; No. 253; King Steam; Silhouette American Health Centre; Colt 107 Recreation Centre; Barefoot Boy; and Roman Bath (nicknamed "Roman Ruins"). In Melbourne the first gay bathhouse was Steamworks at 279 La Trobe Street, which opened in 1979 and closed October 13, 2008. Adelaide's Pulteney 431 is one of the oldest gay saunas in Australia still in operation, having opened in 1977.

Gay saunas, as they are more commonly known in Australia and New Zealand, were present in most large cities in those countries by the late 1980s. As homosexuality was legalised in New Zealand and most Australian states during the 1970s and 1980s, there was no criminal conduct occurring on the premises of such "sex on site venues".

In the United Kingdom, gay saunas were routinely raided by police up until the end of the 1980s; for example, raids in May 1988 on Brownies in Streatham resulted in the establishment's owner getting a six-month jail sentence and a £5,000 fine, and the Brooklyn House Hotel sauna in Manchester. By the 1990s, with increasing scrutiny of the costs of such operations (charges of gross indecency in a sauna normally needing the expense of undercover officers), a reduced likelihood of successful prosecution, concerns of being perceived as homophobic, and little public interest in victimless crime, gay saunas became free to operate without the risk of being raided by police. Also, police attitudes meant that they were more willing to turn a blind eye because they preferred such activity to take place in a contained environment rather than outdoors even though users were still committing the homosexual sexual offence of gross indecency, until gross indecency was wiped from the statute books following the Sexual Offences Act 2003.

== Bathhouses today ==
Sailors leaflet in 1998

Gay bathhouses today continue to fill a similar function as they did historically. The community aspect has lessened in some territories, particularly where gay men increasingly tend to come out.

Some men still use bathhouses as a convenient, safe place to meet other men for sex. In areas where homosexuality is more accepted, safety may no longer be a primary attraction.

Many bathhouses are open twenty-four hours a day, seven days a week. There is typically a single customer entrance and exit. After paying at the main entrance, the customer is buzzed through the main door. This system allows establishments to screen potential troublemakers; many bathhouses refuse entry to those who are visibly intoxicated, as well as known prostitutes. In some areas, particularly where homosexuality is illegal, considered immoral, or viewed with hostility, this is a necessary safety precaution.

Sexual encounters at bathhouses are frequently, but not always, anonymous. Some feel that the anonymity adds to the erotic excitement: that is what, for these patrons, one goes to the bathhouse for. Bathhouse encounters sometimes lead to relationships, but usually do not. Bathhouses are still used by men who have sex with men and do not identify as gay or bisexual, including those that are closeted or in heterosexual relationships.

In many bathhouses the customer has a choice between renting a room or a locker, often for fixed periods of up to 12 hours. A room typically consists of a locker and a single bed (though doubles are sometimes available) with a thin vinyl mat supported on a simple wooden box or frame, an arrangement that facilitates easy cleaning between patrons. In many bathhouses (particularly those outside the United States), some or all of the rooms are freely available to all patrons.

Some bathhouses have areas designed to facilitate impersonal sex. These areas – rooms or hallways – are illuminated only by a (dim) red exit sign. It is possible to have sex, but not to see with whom. Other bathhouses, such as the Continental Baths in New York or the Club Baths in Washington, D.C., have two or more bunkbeds in close proximity, in a public area. This provides a place to have sex for those who could afford only a locker, and facilitated exhibitionism and voyeurism for those so inclined. Baths often have a (porn) TV room or snack bar where patrons can recuperate between orgasms.

Some men use the baths as a cheaper alternative to hotels, despite the limitations of being potentially crowded public venues with only rudimentary rooms and limited or non-existent pass out privileges.

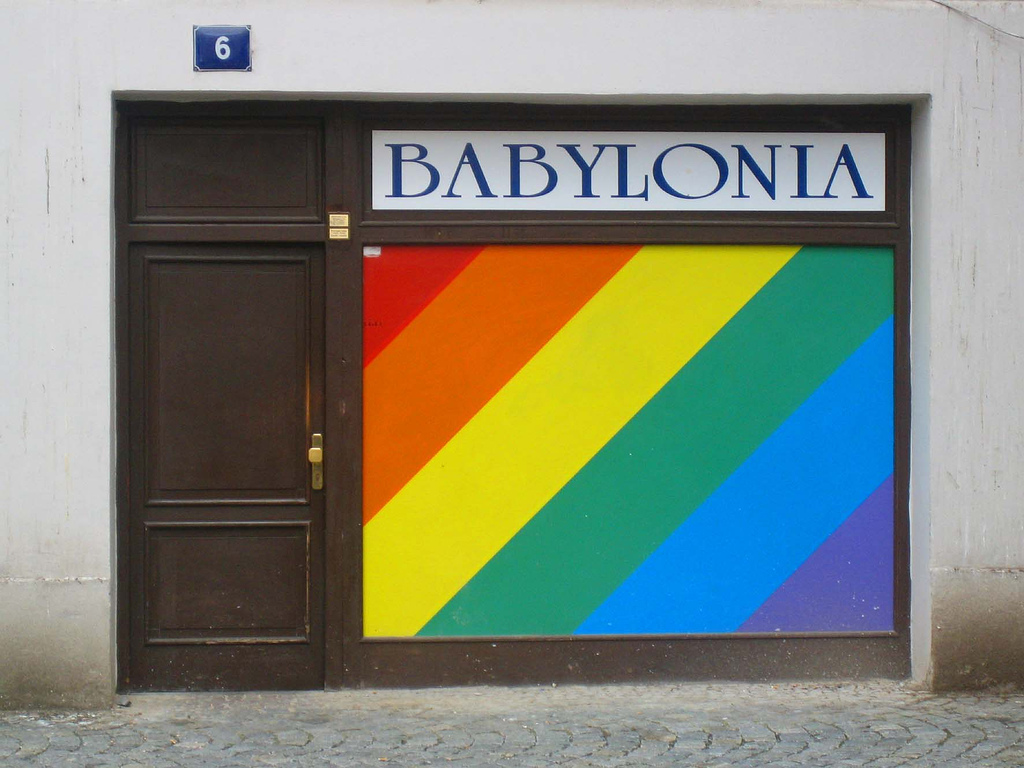
Entrance to Babylonia sauna in Prague, 2006

These guys will actually call me at home or send me e-mails and we will make a date and we will meet at the baths purely because the sling is there and it's easier and we go for a beer afterwards. I use the bathhouse more as an ancient Greek, Roman social centre and also a fucking centre and a fisting centre as well, and there's a lounge where I can sit and relax with a coffee and a cigarette.

— "Peter", Haubrich et al. (2004)

Bathhouses are not always identifiable as such from the outside. Some bathhouses are clearly marked and well lit, others have no marking other than a street address on the door. Bathhouses sometimes display the rainbow flag, which is commonly flown by businesses to identify themselves as gay-run or gay-friendly. Bathhouses commonly advertise widely in the gay press and sometimes advertise in mainstream newspapers and other media. In 2003 Australia began airing possibly the world's first television advertisements for a gay bathhouse when advertisements on commercial television in Melbourne promoted Wet on Wellington, a sauna in Wellington Street, Collingwood.

In many countries, being identified in such a sauna was still viewed by the press as scandalous. In Ireland in November 1994, the Incognito sauna made mainstream press as the gay sauna where a priest had died of a heart attack and two other priests were on hand to help out. Scott Capurro is known for his deliberately provocative comedy material and often refers to gay sexual culture including gay bathhouses.

== Layout and typical amenities ==
On being buzzed in, the customer receives a towel (to wear, around the waist) and the key for his room or locker. The customer undresses, storing his clothing in the locker provided or room, and is then free to wander throughout the bathhouse which typically includes the amenities of a traditional bathhouse or steambath. In contrast with traditional bathhouses for bathing, the common areas of a modern gay bathhouse resemble a gym's locker room or a small lobby.

Many bathhouses also provide free condoms and lubricant. Some establishments require a piece of identification or an item of value to be left with the front desk on entry. Homosexualities emphasized the importance of a towel:

Visiting a downtown gay bath was in many ways like revisiting a high-school gym – everyone wearing the same towel, in the same color, on the same part of the body. There was no status consciousness in the social-stratification sense; the towel or loincloth created a sort of equal-status social group.

— a paragraph, Homosexualities, p239, 1979

Bathhouses are often designed with imagery and/or music to create surroundings that are arousing to the visitors.

Bathhouses are usually dimly lit and play music, although an outdoors, enclosed rooftop or pool area is not uncommon. They are often laid out in a manner that allows or encourages customers to wander throughout the establishment; a space laid out in this way is often referred to as a "maze". Some bathhouses have a space where random, anonymous sex is all that can occur. These spaces—rooms, hallways, or mazes, sometimes with glory holes—have as their only illumination a (dim) red "Exit" sign, so one can have sex but one cannot see with whom. Other clubs, such as the Continental Baths or the Club Baths of Washington, D.C., would have two or more bunk beds placed near each other, in a public area, thus providing a place to have sex for those who can afford only to rent a locker, and also maximizing the chances of being watched, for the exhibitionists so inclined. Rooms are usually grouped together, as are lockers. Bathhouses are frequently decorated with posters of nude or semi-nude men, and sometimes explicit depictions of sex. It is not uncommon to see pornographic movies playing on wall-mounted televisions throughout the bathhouse. The same movies may be shown on smaller screens in the individual rooms, sometimes for an extra fee.

Most men, beyond footwear, typically just wear the towel provided. According to bathhouse etiquette, it is perfectly acceptable, even friendly, to put one's hand under someone else's towel to feel his penis, which, if well received, is the first step in sexual intimacy. Some bathhouses permit and others not only permit but encourage total nudity. In some bathhouses nudity is forbidden in the common areas of the establishments. Some men may wear underwear or fetish-wear, but it is unusual for customers to remain fully or even partially dressed in street clothes. Bare feet are frequent, though some men prefer to wear flip flops or sandals, sometimes provided by the establishment, for foot protection. The room or locker key is usually suspended from an elastic band which can be worn around the wrist or ankle.

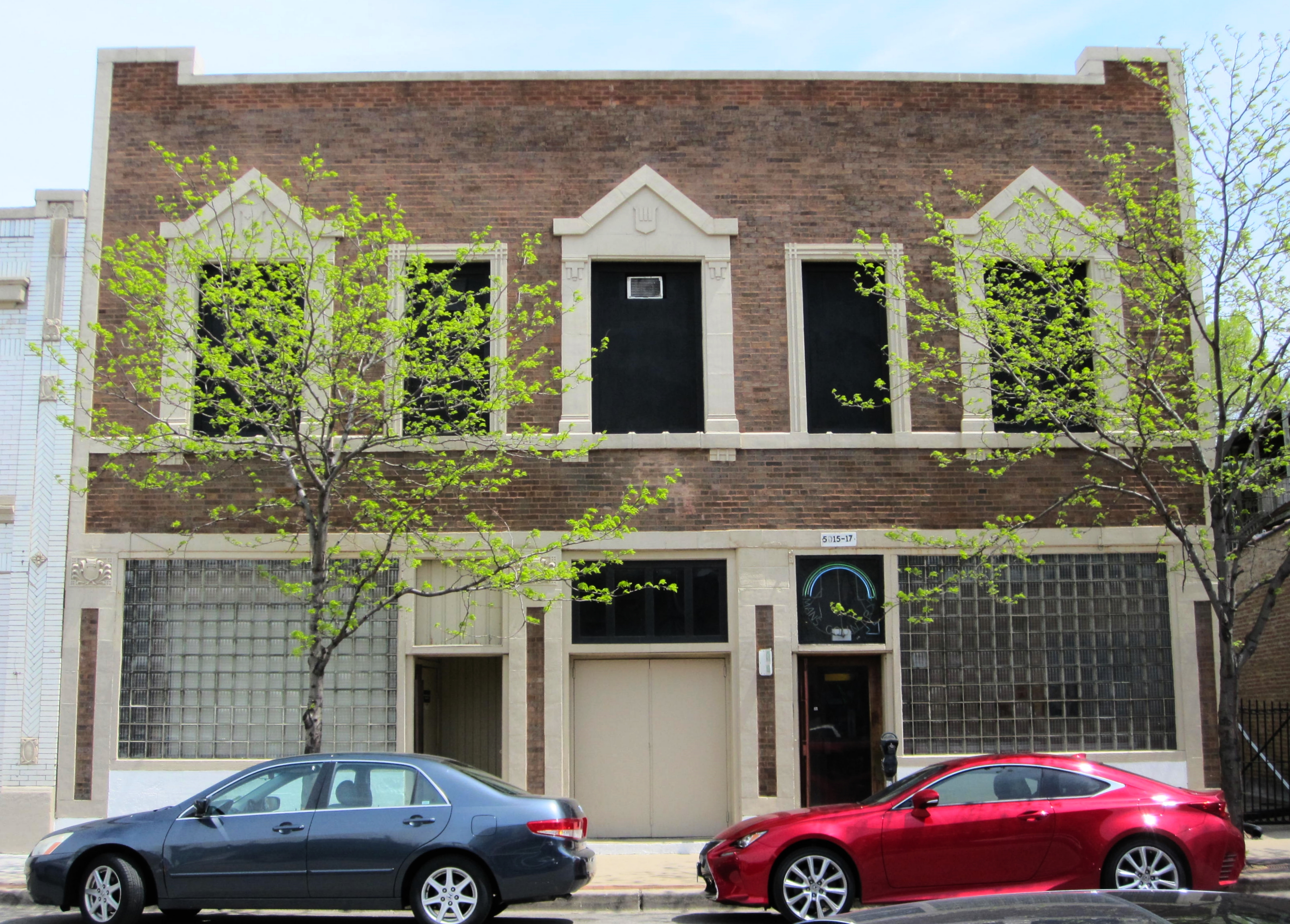
Man's Country (Chicago)

Some bathhouses require customers to purchase yearly memberships and many offer special entry rates to members, students, military, or other groups. In some countries, bathhouses can restrict entrance to men of certain age ranges (apart from the general requirement of being an adult) or physical types, although in other places this would be considered illegal discrimination. Some bathhouses hold occasional "leather", "underwear", or other theme nights.

In the 1970s bathhouses began to install "fantasy environments" which simulated erotic situations that would be illegal or dangerous in reality:

Orgy rooms ... encouraged group sex, while glory holes recreated (public) toilets, and mazes took the place of bushes and undergrowth (in public parks). Steam rooms and gyms were reminiscent of the cruisy YMCAs, while video rooms recreated the balconies and back rows of movie theaters. A popular Chicago bathhouse called Man's Country provided a full-size model of an Everlast truck where visitors could have sex in the cab or in the rear, which served as an orgy room ... Man's Country also offered a [...] fake prison cell made of rubber bars.

— Eddie Coronado

Many bathhouses sell food and drinks, cigarettes, pornography, sex toys, lubricants, and toiletries. Some bathhouses also provide non-sexual services such as massage and reflexology.

== Etiquette ==
Customers typically divide their time between the showers, saunas, and hot tub area and the main areas of the establishment. Customers who have rented rooms have free access to their room.

Customers who have rooms may leave their room doors open to signal that they are available for sex. An open door can also be an invitation for others to watch or join in sexual activity that is already occurring.

When a room is occupied only by a single person, some men will position themselves to suggest what they might like from someone joining them in the room: those who would like to be penetrated anally ("bottoms") will sometimes lie face down on the bed with the door open, while those who prefer to penetrate others ("tops") or to receive fellatio might lie face up.

In the past, the baths served as community spaces for gay men. Even now, some men choose to go to the baths with their friends (even though they may not necessarily have sex with each other). While many men talk to each other at the baths, even forming long-lasting friendships or relationships, many others do not, preferring, for various reasons, anonymity.

But I've been to a sauna recently in New Zealand, where everyone just chatted away, which I found very strange. Um, but you know, that's because I guess it was a smaller city and people generally knew each other.

— "S Alfred", The Social Construction of Sexual Practice, (Richters 2006, PhD Thesis)

In this highly sexualized environment a look or nod is frequently enough to express interest. In darkened areas of the establishment including the mazes, video rooms, group sex areas, and the saunas or hot tubs (but not generally in the showers, toilets, hallways, gyms, café areas, and lounges), men are usually free to touch other patrons; it is expected, and often welcomed. A shake of the head, or pushing away the other's hand, means that the attention is not welcomed.

I normally find people with groping don't go away. You really have to as they grope your crotch area grab their hand and push it away and there have been times when I've had to do that three, two or three or four times before they actually get the message. There's also been times when I actually just had to say to them to fuck off.

— "Richard", The Social Construction of Sexual Practice, (Richters 2006, PhD Thesis)

Some establishments allow or encourage sex in specific group sex areas. In some jurisdictions such activity is prohibited, and sex must be confined to private rooms. Some forbid sex in pools for hygiene reasons. In the United Kingdom, the requirement is often set by the local authority's Environmental Health department.

== High-risk behavior ==
=== Sexually transmitted diseases ===
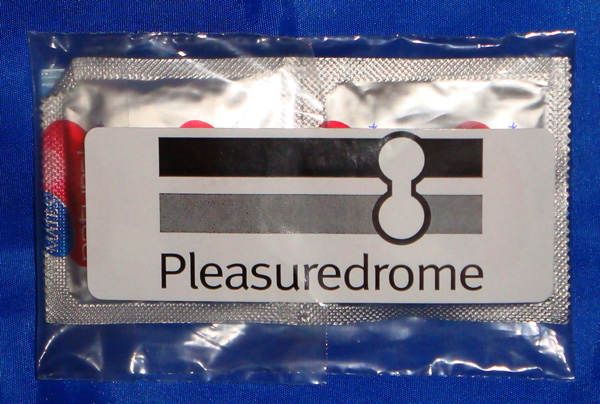
Pleasuredrome condoms

From the mid-1980s onward there was lobbying against gay bathhouses blaming them for being a focus of infection encouraging the spread of sexually transmitted diseases (STDs), in particular HIV, and this forced their closure in some jurisdictions (see Legal issues, below).

In some countries, fears about the spread of STDs have prompted the closing of bathhouses—with their private rooms—in favor of sex clubs, in which all sexual activity takes place in the open, and can be observed by monitors whose job it is to enforce safe-sex practices. However, proponents of bathhouses point out that closing these facilities does not prevent people from engaging in unsafe sex.

Neither the claim that bathhouses are responsible for the spread of sexually transmitted diseases, nor the claim that they are not, has been conclusively proven. However, it is known that STDs are spread via unprotected sex, and as part of their membership agreement, or as a condition of entry, some bathhouses now require customers to affirm in writing that they will only practice safe sex on the premises. In addition, venues frequently provide free condoms, latex gloves, and lubrication (and/or have them available for purchase). In New Zealand and Australia, the New Zealand AIDS Foundation and constituent members of the Australian Federation of AIDS Organizations provide safe sex information for sex on site venue users.

Some anti-bathhouse activists argue that these measures are not enough, given that it is virtually impossible to monitor sexual activity in a bathhouse. However, while they acknowledge that closing gay bathhouses may force some men into unsafe or illegal situations in public parks and lavatories, they point out that they may be less likely to engage in anal or multi-partner sex, both of which put participants at greater risk for contracting STDs.

Others counter these claims by pointing out that bathhouses are a major source of safer sex information, providing pamphlets and posting safer sex posters prominently (often on the walls of each room as well as in the common areas). In cities with larger gay populations, STD and HIV testing and counseling may be offered on-site for no charge.

=== Drugs ===
In some countries, bathhouses are prohibited from selling alcohol. (In Canada, where some bathhouses serve alcohol, a bathhouse holding a liquor license may be required to submit to liquor inspections, which activists claim are often a pretext for regulating gay sexual activity.) Many bathhouses deny entry to those who are visibly intoxicated but do not—or cannot—regulate the consumption of drugs (typically marijuana, poppers, ecstasy, cocaine, and crystal meth) by their patrons. The use of drugs may make people more likely to engage in unsafe sex. Sex clubs with no private areas may find it easier to regulate the consumption of drugs on their premises.

The use of crystal meth is also known to lead to riskier sexual behavior, but since gay crystal meth users tend to seek out other users to engage in sexual activity, they often prefer to make such arrangements via the internet.

=== Prostitution ===
In some countries straight and gay bathhouses are used by rent boys to find customers by offering massage services, the "complete service" is often used as a euphemism for sex.

All interviewees were asked whether or not they used condoms, and all with the exception of Fabian, said they used them when having penetrative sex with clients. For fellatio, sometimes they used condoms and sometimes not ... For him (Fabian), it was all the same whether he used a condom or not. He also talked about the drugs he had taken, pure alcohol, crack cocaine, and 'sometimes I inject, maybe 15 times I've injected, crystal, cocaine and sometimes heroin'.

— Interviews with masajistas ('masseurs') in a Mexico City gay bathhouse, Peter Aggleton, Men who Sell Sex, 1999

== Legal issues ==
=== Canada ===
1977 Mystique and Truxx bathhouse raids

The 1977 Mystique and Truxx bathhouse raids in Montreal involved 146 people being arrested, although most of the charges were later dropped or dismissed in court. These raids led within a few months to Quebec becoming the first government in Canada to pass a law banning discrimination on the basis of sexual orientation.

Toronto bathhouse raids of 1981

On February 5, 1981, 150 police raided four gay bathhouses in Toronto, Ontario: the Club Baths, the Romans II Health and Recreation Spa, the Richmond Street Health Emporium, and The Barracks. The Richmond Health Emporium was so badly damaged in the raid that it never reopened. Nicknamed Operation Soap, the raid resulted in the arrests of 268 men. There was an immediate and angry response from both the gay and lesbian community and over 3,000 people gathered in protest. A second demonstration which took place on February 20, included over 4,000 people who gathered at Queen's Park and marched to Metro Toronto Police's 52 Division. Operation Soap is considered a special turning point in the history of the lesbian, gay, bisexual and transgender community in Canada; the raids and their aftermath are today widely considered to be the Canadian equivalent of the 1969 Stonewall riots in New York City.

Raid on Toronto Women's Bathhouse

In 2000, Toronto police raided a women's night at a bathhouse called Club Toronto. Police, almost all of them male, entered the establishment and walked around, taking the names and addresses of some 10 women and "aggressively questioned" volunteers. A Pussy Palace organizer stated "[m]any women at the event were deeply angered and traumatized". A judge of the Ontario Court of Justice held that the police had violated the Canadian Charter of Rights and Freedoms by using male police officers in the raid, describing the police actions as analogous to a strip search.

Raid on Goliath's
In December 2002, Calgary police raided Goliath's resulting in charges against 19 men. Fifteen men were arrested in the raid. Thirteen customers were charged as "found-ins" (found in a common bawdy house without a legal excuse) and two staff members were charged with the more serious offense of keeping a common bawdy house. The customers faced up to two years in prison. In addition, the owners of the bathhouse and a third staff member were later charged with keeping a common bawdy house.

On May 27, 2004, a judge ruled that the police had reasonable justification to raid Goliath's. Defense lawyers countered that none of the anonymous information the police acted upon – for example that live sex shows were being staged and drugs sold on the premises – featured in the charges made against the seventeen men. They also pointed out that the police failed to call in the force's gay community liaison officer. Goliath's reopened a little more than a month after the raid.

In November 2004, the Crown stayed the found-in charge against the last remaining patron, saying it was no longer in the public interest to pursue the case. The case against the owners and managers of Goliath's, however, was expected to come to trial in February 2005. Terry Haldane, the only "found-in" patron who was actively fighting the charge against him, accused the Crown of dropping the charge because Haldane and his lawyers had given notice of their plan to challenge the bawdy house law all the way to the Supreme Court.

In February 2005, all remaining charges in the case were dropped. The court cited a lack of community support and evidence (from a poll) that the community supported the existence of gay bathhouses by a small margin.

Raid on Hamilton's Warehouse Spa
On August 3, 2004, Hamilton's Warehouse Spa and Bath was "inspected" by a task force of officers from the police, public health, the city's building and licensing department, the fire department, and the alcohol and gaming commission. Two men were arrested and charged with committing indecent acts.

=== United States ===
As of 2013, Los Angeles, Chicago, Philadelphia, Atlanta, San Diego, Seattle, Berkeley, San Jose, Cleveland, Portland, Providence, Reno, Las Vegas, Detroit, Indianapolis, Houston, Dallas, Denver, Miami and Fort Lauderdale were some of the American cities that had bathhouses in operation.

In 1985, the New York City Health Department ordered that the city's gay bathhouses be closed. As a result, heterosexual sex clubs such as Plato's Retreat had to shut down as well because the city had just passed a gay rights ordinance, and allowing the heterosexual clubs to remain open while closing the gay establishments would have been a violation of that ordinance.

In 1988, Minneapolis banned bathhouses; however, this ban was repealed in 2026.

On October 8, 2010, ten patrons and one employee were arrested during a police raid at Club Dallas in Texas. The patrons were charged with either public lewdness or indecent exposure while the employee was charged with interfering with the police. The Dallas Police Department's liaison to the gay community stated that their actions were in response to a complaint.

==== California ====
In 1973, it was added to San Francisco’s police code, in Article 26, that locked rooms were not allowed in bathhouses, and that owners of public bathhouses must have a daily register of their patrons that health department employees and police could see at any time; Article 26 was repealed in 2024.

In California the "Consenting Adult Sex Bill", passed in January 1976, made gay bathhouses and the sex that took place within them legal for the first time. During the 1970s, the two most popular gay bathhouses in San Francisco, both located in the SOMA neighborhood, were the Ritch Street Health Club, the interior of which was designed like a Minoan palace, and The Barracks, a BDSM bathhouse on Hallam near Folsom Street, in which each room was designed to accommodate a different BDSM sexual fantasy. In 1978, a group of police officers raided the Liberty Baths in the Polk Gulch neighborhood of San Francisco and arrested three patrons for "lewd conduct in a public place", but the District Attorney's office soon dropped the charges against them.

In 1984, San Francisco city and county sued the operators of bathhouses, saying they were a "public health nuisance." A judge’s ruling declared the bathhouses could only stay open if they had "monitors" to make sure people there were not having unsafe sex, and sexual activity was visible with few walls or doors. 21st Street Baths was the last gay bathhouse in San Francisco when it closed in 1987, the owners having been charged with not banning unsafe sex, and reaching a settlement with San Francisco that would dismiss the charges if the bathhouse was closed. In 1997 less harsh rules were instituted, but those rules still mandated "monitors" and no locks on doors. In 2021 the rules requiring monitors and no locked doors were repealed. In 2022 the mayor of San Francisco signed an ordinance changing zoning matters and allowing traditional gay bathhouses to reopen in historically LGBTQ neighborhoods, such as the South of Market and Castro districts.

=== China ===
In March 2008, a series of police raids in gay bathhouses and at gay meeting spots in Beijing resulted in arrests and bathhouse closures. This included raids on two branches of the Oasis bathhouses, known to be the most popular in Beijing. In 2000, police arrested 37 men in a Guangzhou gay spa on charges of prostitution. Homosexuality was legalised in China in 1997.

=== Germany, Austria and Switzerland ===
The German-speaking countries have many gay bathhouses (schwule Saunas) since homosexuality had been legalized in 1969 (and later). The oldest ones are the Hotel Deutsche Eiche (German Oak) in Munich, the Vulcan-Sauna in Hanover and Kaiserbründl in Vienna.

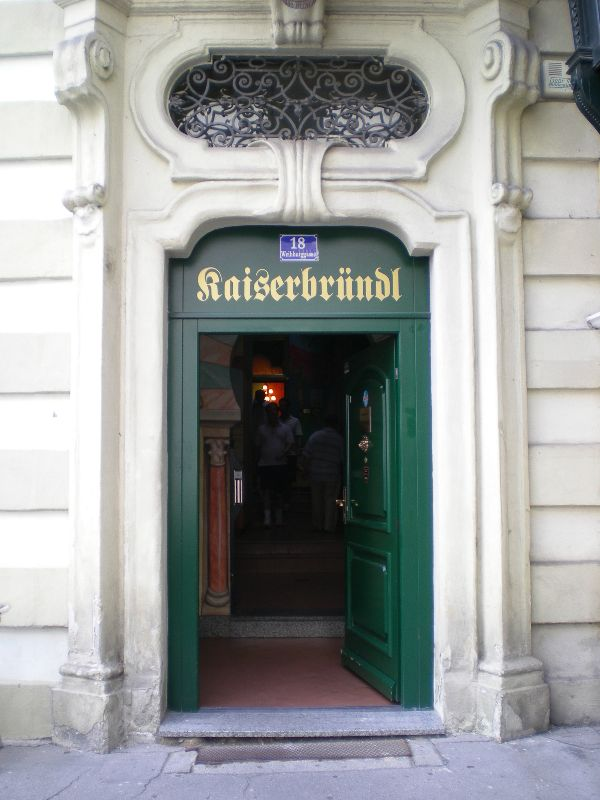
Kaiserbründl-Sauna in Central Bathhouse Vienna

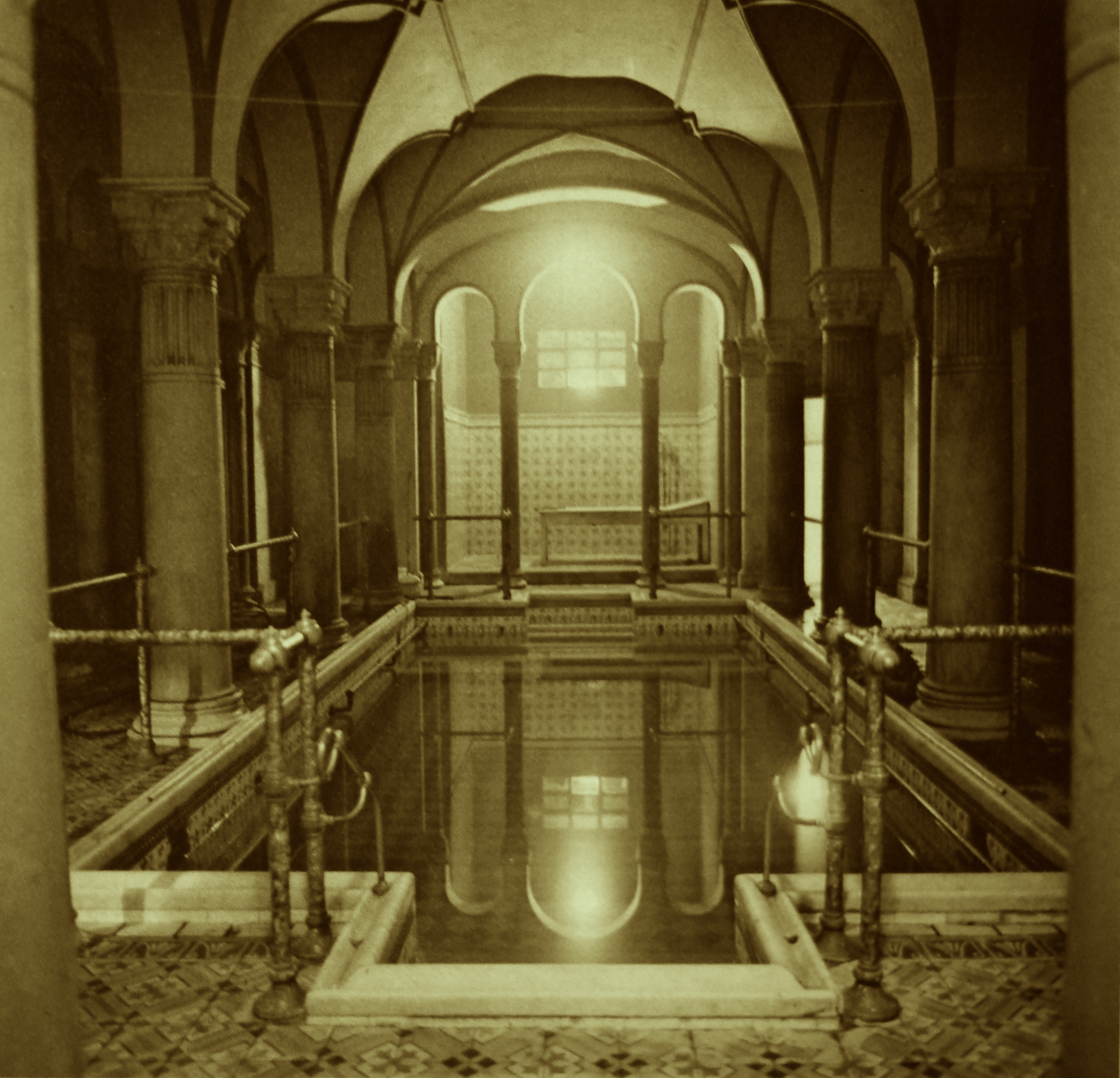
Kaiserbründl: Pool for men (1889)

=== Sweden ===
During the AIDS crisis in the 1980s, the Swedish government in 1987 banned gay saunas (Swedish: bastuklubb), by amending the country's public health law, the Infections Protection Act under the law known informally as the Bastuklubbslagen (SFS 1987:375). The aim was to stop the spread of HIV and other sexually transmitted diseases. The law was criticised by noted gay rights organisation RSFL. Gay saunas were re-legalised on the July 1, 2004, due to a revision of law. The first gay sauna to be opened since the law was repealed was Klubb Vegas in Stockholm in April 2005.

== Notable patrons ==
Truman Capote
Gay author Truman Capote wrote about his visits to the Everard Baths.
Andrew Cunanan
Andrew Cunanan's membership card to the West Side Club NYC was recovered in Miami Beach close to where he killed designer Gianni Versace. It is not known if Cunanan visited the bathhouse during his murder spree or at some other time. Other receipts indicated he had visited New York in early May 1997 between the murder of Chicago developer Lee Miglin and Finn's Point National Cemetery caretaker William Reese.
Justin Fashanu
The first openly gay British footballer Justin Fashanu (1961–1998) spent his last night in Chariots Roman Spa.
Michel Foucault
The influential 20th-century French philosopher Michel Foucault (1926–1984) visited bathhouses in California in the 1970s and early 1980s, and the Mineshaft in New York.
Jack Fritscher
Gay erotic author and editor Jack Fritscher (born 1939) made hundreds of visits to the Mineshaft (a bathhouse without the bath).
Andrew Holleran
Andrew Holleran (born 1943) has written both essays and fiction about his experiences at the baths. The fatal May 25, 1977, fire at the Everard Baths in New York is a crucial event in his novel Dancer from the Dance (1978). Edmund White recalls, "I used to see him years ago at the gay baths. But he wouldn't be having sex; he would just observe."
Mikhail Kuzmin
Russian poet, novelist and composer Mikhail Kuzmin (1872–1936) is known to have patronized bathhouses. Some of the bathhouses in St. Petersburg at the time became known as friendly to gay men and provided "attendants", who might provide sexual services for a fee. In his diary, Kuzmin writes of one bathhouse visit: "the evening I had the urge to go to a bathhouse simply to be stylish, for the fun of it, for cleanliness."
Harvey Milk
The openly gay American politician Harvey Milk (1930–1978) vowed to stop visiting gay bathhouses when he ran for supervisor in 1975.
Rudolf Nureyev
The Russian dancer Rudolf Nureyev (1938–1993) was known to frequent the baths in New York. He did not get past the door of the Mineshaft.
Ned Rorem
The composer Ned Rorem (1923–2022) wrote of his visits to the Everard Baths.
Edmund White
Novelist Edmund White acknowledges visits to the baths in New York (where he would see Andrew Holleran).
Gore Vidal
Bisexual author Gore Vidal (1925–2012) was a documented patron of the Everard Baths.

== Celebrities and the Continental Baths ==
Singer Bette Midler is well known for getting her start at the famous Continental Baths in New York City in the early 1970s, where she earned the nickname Bathhouse Betty. It was there, accompanied by pianist Barry Manilow (who, like the bathhouse patrons, sometimes wore only a white towel), that she created her stage persona "the Divine Miss M". On getting her start in bathhouses, Midler has remarked:

Despite the way things turned out [with the AIDS crisis], I'm still proud of those days [when I got my start singing at the gay bathhouses]. I feel like I was at the forefront of the gay liberation movement, and I hope I did my part to help it move forward. So, I kind of wear the label of 'Bathhouse Betty' with pride.

== See also ==
- Public bathing
- Public sex
- Hall–Carpenter Archives
- Homosocialization
- List of films featuring gay bathhouses
- Adult video arcade
- Sex club
- Caldron (sex club)
- Catacombs (sex club)
- Mineshaft (gay club)
- Bathhouse: The Musical!, 2006 musical by Tim Evanicki and Esther Daack
