= Dancer from the Dance =

1978 novel by Andrew Holleran

- Cover of the first edition
- Author: Andrew Holleran
- Language: English
- Genre: Gay novel
- Publisher: William Morrow & Co.
- Publication date: 1978
- Publication place: United States
- Media type: Print (hardcover)
- Pages: 250 pp
- ISBN: 978-0-688-03357-6

Dancer from the Dance is a 1978 novel by Andrew Holleran (pen name of Eric Garber) about gay men in New York City and Fire Island.

== Title ==
The book's title is derived from William Butler Yeats' poem "Among school children" published in 1928. It ends with the stanza:

Labour is blossoming or dancing where
The body is not bruised to pleasure soul,
Nor beauty born out of its own despair,
Nor blear-eyed wisdom out of midnight oil.
O chestnut tree, great rooted blossomer,
Are you the leaf, the blossom or the bole?
O body swayed to music, O brightening glance,
How can we know the dancer from the dance?

== Plot ==
Malone, a handsome young man from the Midwest, leaves behind his straight life as a lawyer to immerse himself in the gay life of 1970s New York. He meets Andrew Sutherland, variously described as a speed addict, a socialite, and a drag queen who guides him through his new social circle. Their social life includes long nights of drinking, dancing, and drug use in New York's gay bars. Though they enjoy many physical pleasures, their lives lack any spiritual depth. Much of the plot concerns Sutherland's efforts to leverage Malone's beauty by "marrying" him to a young millionaire. The marriage never happens: Sutherland dies of an overdose, and Malone goes for a late-night swim the same night. He is never seen again.

== Style and themes ==
The book switches perspective often. Characters are sometimes tracked closely using traditional omniscient narrative techniques, before turning to one character's point of view. Yale Review contributor Garth Greenwell posits that this narrative structure echoes Yeats' poem ("How can we know the dancers from the dance?"): "[and] alternates between first person singular, the enigmatic narrator whose circumstances we only ever glimpse, and a communal “we.”

The narrative centered around Malone builds over the course of the novel to reach a finale, but unlike the Bildungsroman, Holleran saw it as "constant, multiple cycles of love, “like the growing and dying of a plant, from indifference to love to extinction”."

== Reception ==
The novel is known for its vivid imagery, and lush language depicting gay men searching for love and acceptance in a harsh, dreamlike urban landscape. The novel was one of the first among gay fiction to portray the party atmosphere of Fire Island, a summer community on Long Island where many urban homosexuals celebrated drugs, parties, tea dances, and sexual exploration.

The New York Times critic John Lahr described the book's style as "superb", writing that "erotic heat percolates through these pages: Men burn for love; the metaphor for their obsession is dancing." Kirkus reviews was more critical, writing that "without a single character capable of growth, this fiction debut can't succeed as a novel. But it does succeed off and on as a vivid, perceptive, authentically pathetic neon side show".

The book can be read from a moralist perspective, as a criticism of the world it depicts. This point of view often pairs Dancer from the Dance, with Faggots by Larry Kramer, another gay novel published the same year. The latter is a direct and incisive critique of the 1970s New York city gay scene, and takes on a judgmental tone while Holleran left his book's perspective ambivalent.

There was some speculation that Holleran wrote the book under a pseudonym due to its subject matter. The author denied the fact, stating that he would always write under a pseudonym to better separate his private and public lives.

== Influence ==
Published in the same year as Edmund White's Nocturnes for the King of Naples and Larry Kramer's Faggots, Dancer from the Dance is regarded as a major contribution to post-Stonewall gay male literature and it enjoys cult status in the gay community. It has been described as "the best gay novel of all time," a work that is continually rediscovered by new generations of gay male readers despite not being taught in colleges and universities, unlike other classic works by writers from minority groups.
