= The Lost Library: Gay Fiction Rediscovered =

2010 book

- First edition
- Editor: Tom Cardamone
- Cover artist: Mel Odom
- Language: English
- Publisher: Haiduk Press
- Publication date: March 2010
- Media type: Print (paperback)
- Pages: 232
- ISBN: 978-0-971-46863-4

The Lost Library: Gay Fiction Rediscovered, edited by Tom Cardamone, includes appreciations by 28 contemporary writers of significant gay novels and short story collections now out of print. The Lost Library includes an essay on reprints of gay literature by Philip Clark. Published in March 2010, it features a cover illustration by Mel Odom.

== Table of contents ==
1. Introduction — Tom Cardamone
2. Rabih Alameddine, The Perv: Stories — Michael Graves
3. Allen Barnett, The Body and Its Dangers — Christopher Bram
4. Neil Bartlett, Ready to Catch Him, Should He Fall — Philip Clark
5. George Baxt, A Queer Kind of Death — Larry Duplechan
6. Bruce Benderson, User — Rob Stephenson
7. Christopher Coe, Such Times — Jameson Currier
8. Daniel Curzon, Something You Do in the Dark — Jesse Monteagudo
9. Melvin Dixon, Vanishing Rooms — Ian Rafael Titus
10. John Donovan, I'll Get There. It Better Be Worth the Trip — Martin Wilson
11. Robert Ferro, The Blue Star — Stephen Greco
12. John Gilgun, Music I Never Dreamed Of — Wayne Courtois
13. Agustín Gómez-Arcos, The Carnivorous Lamb — Richard Reitsma
14. Michael Grumley, Life Drawing — Sam Miller
15. Lynn Hall, Sticks and Stones — Sean Meriwether
16. Richard Hall, Couplings — Jonathan Harper
17. J.S. Marcus, The Captain’s Fire — Aaron Hamburger
18. James McCourt, Time Remaining — Tim Young
19. Mark Merlis, American Studies — Rick Whitaker
20. Charles Nelson, The Boy Who Picked the Bullets Up — Jim Marks
21. Kyle Onstott and Lance Horner, Child of the Sun — Michael Bronski
22. Roger Peyrefitte, The Exile of Capri — Gregory Woods
23. Paul Reed, Longing — Bill Brent
24. Paul Rogers, Saul's Book — Paul Russell
25. Patrick Roscoe, Birthmarks — Andy Quan
26. Douglas Sadownick, Sacred Lips of the Bronx — Tom Cardamone
27. Glenway Wescott, The Apple of the Eye — Jerry Rosco
28. George Whitmore, Nebraska — Victor Bumbalo
29. Donald Windham, Two People, Philip Gambone
30. Come Again: A History of the Reprinting of Gay Novels, Philip Clark

== Awards ==
The Lost Library won the San Francisco Book Festival's gay category for best book of the spring season, and was named one of the 10 best nonfiction books of 2010 in Richard Labonté's Book Marks column.
