= Nebraska (novel) =

1987 novel

- Author: George Whitmore
- Genre: Bildungsroman, gay literature
- Set in: 1950's Nebraska
- Publisher: Grove Press
- Publication date: 1987
- Pages: 153
- ISBN: 9780802100269

Nebraska is a 1987 gay novel by American author George Whitmore. It is a coming of age story about Craig McMullen, a boy in Nebraska who lost his leg in a car accident, and the development of his sexual identity. It received positive reviews in the gay press for its discomforting plot. Whitmore died two years after it was written.

== Background and publication ==
George Whitmore was an American author who earlier published The Confessions of Danny Slocum. He was a member of the Violet Quill, a group of gay writers (including Edmund White, Andrew Holleran, Robert Ferro, Felice Picano, Michael Grumley, and Christopher Cox) that met several times 1980 and 1981. He was also a journalist, who wrote the book Someone Was Here (originally published in The New York Times) a few months before the release of Nebraska, and wrote articles for the gay press. He was diagnosed with AIDS around the time the book was written.

Nebraska was published by Grove Press in 1987 as a hardcover book; it contained 153 pages, and was sold for $15.95. It was written at the height of the AIDS epidemic in the United States. At the time, there was little fiction that dealt with LGBT life in the American state of Nebraska.

== Plot ==
After a car hits him in the 1950s, the young boy Craig McMullen loses his leg and lives in Nebraska. His uncle, Wayne, is gay, and is waiting to move in with his friend, Vernon, and work together in California. Wayne cannot express his sexuality publicly; he touches Craig's penis, and is arrested in a police raid at a bathroom in Omaha. Craig lies to his friend Wesley, and says that Wayne had given him several handjobs before, so Wesley should also give him one. Ultimately, because of his lie, Craig testifies against Wayne at a criminal trial. Years later, Craig goes to California to see Wayne, and he learns that Wayne was castrated and lives with Vernon. There, he places Wayne's hand on his erect penis.

== Reception ==
Literary critic Jeff Kirsch wrote that the novel was an important artifact of gay history and gay literature, though because of the discomfort it brings in the reader, it is similar to "deciding to read about the Holocaust"—warning that while readers may not get "any pleasure from it", they will nonetheless appreciate it. Similarly, Duncan Mitchel in Gay Community News said it was similar to Alice Walker's The Color Purple (1982), in that it tried to make sense of bigotry, but that it was not nearly as lyrical as Walker's writing. Kirsch called it, alongside The Lost Language of Cranes by David Leavitt, an original piece of recent coming of age literature. He criticized the novel's use of language; while the narrative was often purposely written ungramattically because of its "regional" Midwestern qualities, Whitmore occasionally used language that was beyond its narrator's apparent "linguistic ability". Gay literature scholar Les Wright called it "unflinching", and praised its characters for their authenticity and its setting for its accuracy—many gay men at the time had "fled" the cities to settle in smaller communities, similar to the Nebraska of Whitemore's novel. John Mort of the Kansas City Star contrasted Whitmore's vision of Nebraska as filled with "grotesques" with that of traditional Great Plains authors Willa Cather, Mari Sandoz, and Wright Morris.

Literary scholar Jacqueline Foertsch wrote that although the novel takes place before the AIDS epidemic emerged, the novel is best understood as analogous to AIDS: Craig's struggles are, for Foertsch, "representative of the very injustices AIDS causes contemporary gay men to suffer". Foertsch wrote that the novel is not truly a "pre-AIDS" one, but a "para-AIDS" story. Joseph Dewey wrote that it was the "most significant journal of our plague years", even though he acknowledges—like Foertsch—that it does not discuss HIV or AIDS.

After Whitmore's death on April 19, 1989, the activist and writer Michael Bronski wrote that Nebraska would "probably be Whitmore's most lasting contribution to gay fiction", which at the time was "somewhat overshadowed" by his other work, in particular Someone Was Here.

Long out of print, the novel was republished in 2025 with an introduction by Bronski.
