= Felice Picano =

American writer, publisher and critic (1944–2025)

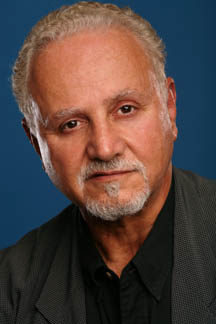
- Picano c. 2008
- Born: Felice Anthony Picano; February 22, 1944; New York City, U.S.
- Died: March 12, 2025 (aged 81); Los Angeles, California, U.S.
- Education: Queens College, City University of New York
- Occupations: Poet; memoirist; novelist; critic; playwright; publisher

Felice Anthony Picano (February 22, 1944 – March 12, 2025) was an American writer, publisher and critic who encouraged the development of gay literature in the United States. His work is documented in many sources.

== Life and career ==
Felice Anthony Picano was born in Queens on February 22, 1944, and graduated cum laude from Queens College in 1964 with English department honors. He founded SeaHorse Press in 1977, and The Gay Presses of New York in 1981 with Terry Helbing and Larry Mitchell; he was editor-in-chief there. He was an editor and writer for The Advocate, Blueboy, Mandate, Gaysweek, and Christopher Street. He was the Books Editor of The New York Native. At The Los Angeles Examiner, San Francisco Examiner, New York Native, Harvard Lesbian & Gay Review and the Lambda Book Report, he was a culture reviewer. He also wrote for OUT and OUT Traveller. With Andrew Holleran, Robert Ferro, Michael Grumley, Edmund White, Christopher Cox, and George Whitmore, he founded the literary group The Violet Quill, considered to be the pathbreaking gay male literary nucleus of the 20th Century.

In a 2024 letter to the London Review of Books, Picano objected to the "apotheosis" reserved by Vivian Gornick for the Village Voice in her review of Tricia Romano's book, titled The Freaks Came Out to Write, about the New York periodical. He claimed that "anyone reading only the Voice would have been unaware of any LGB contribution to culture in the 1970s and 1980s," adding that, in the periodical, there was "no popular music department" and "so disco's worldwide explosion went unremarked."

In his memoir Men Who Loved Me, he described his close friendship with the poet W. H. Auden. In his later memoir/history, Art & Sex in Greenwich Village, he wrote about contacts with Gore Vidal, James Purdy, Charles Henri Ford, Edward Gorey, Robert Mapplethorpe and many contemporary and younger authors. In True Stories, Picano wrote about other people including Bette Midler, Diana Vreeland, as well as friends and acquaintances from his childhood and early adulthood. In his newest book, Nights at Rizzoli, Picano writes about being a book clerk and bookstore manager in the early 1970s with Salvador Dalí, Jerome Robbins, Jackie Onassis, Gregory Peck, Mick Jagger and S.J. Perelman.

Among those who Picano introduced to the public via his publishing companies were Dennis Cooper, Harvey Fierstein, Jane Chambers, Brad Gooch, Doric Wilson, Robert Peters (writer), and Gavin Dillard. Several of his novels have been national and international best-sellers, and they have been translated into fifteen languages.

A longtime resident of Manhattan and Fire Island Pines, Picano resided for periods of time in Los Angeles, San Francisco, London, England, and Berlin, Germany. He later settled in West Hollywood, California. He died from lymphoma at Cedars-Sinai Medical Center in Los Angeles, on March 12, 2025, at the age of 81.

== Literary prizes ==
Picano received the Ferro-Grumley Award and Gay Times of England Award for best gay novel and the Syndicated Fiction/PEN Award for best short story, as well as the Jane Chambers Play Award in 1985. He was a finalist for the first Hemingway Foundation/PEN Award and was nominated for five Lambda Literary Awards. He received the Lambda Literary Foundation's Pioneer Award in 2010, and the City of West Hollywood's Rainbow Award and Citation in 2013.

== Publications ==
=== Novels and short story collections ===
- Smart as the Devil, Arbor House (New York, NY), 1975.
- Eyes, Arbor House (New York, NY), 1975.
- The Mesmerist, Delacorte (New York, NY), 1977.
- The Lure, Delacorte (New York, NY), 1979, Alyson Books (Los Angeles, CA), 2002, Bold Strokes Books, Inc, (Valley Falls NY) 2008
- Late in the Season, Delacorte (New York, NY), 1981, Bold Strokes Books, Inc, (Valley Falls NY) 2008
- An Asian Minor: The True Story of Ganymede Sea HorsePress (New York, NY), 1981.
- Slashed to Ribbons in Defense of Love and Other Stories Gay Presses of New York (New York, NY), 1983.
- House of Cards, Delacorte (New York, NY), 1984.
- To the Seventh Power, William Morrow (New York, NY), 1989.
- Dryland's End, Masquerade Books, 1995, Harrington Park Press (New York, NY), 2004.
- Like People in History, Viking (New York, NY), 1995.
- Looking Glass Lives, illustrated by F. Ronald Fowler, Alyson Books (Los Angeles, CA), 1998, Bold Strokes Books, Inc, (Valley Falls NY) 2008
- The Book of Lies, Alyson Books (Los Angeles, CA), 1999.
- The New York Years: Stories (contains An Asian Minor and Slashed to Ribbons in Defense of Love), Alyson Books (Los Angeles, CA), 2000.
- Onyx, Alyson Books (Los Angeles, CA), 2001.
- Tales: From a Distant Planet (collection), French Connection Press (Paris, France)
- Contemporary Gay Romances (collection), Bold Strokes Books, Inc, (Valley Falls, NY), 2010
- Twelve O'Clock Tales (collection), Bold Strokes Books, Inc, (Valley Falls, NY) 2011
- Twentieth Century Un-limited: Two Novellas, Bold Strokes Books, Inc, (Valley Falls, NY) 2012

=== Memoirs ===
- Ambidextrous: The Secret Lives of Children, Gay Presses of New York (New York, NY), 1985.
- Men Who Loved Me: A Memoir in the Form of a Novel, New American Library (New York, NY), 1989.
- A House on the Ocean, a House on the Bay: A Memoir, Faber and Faber (Boston, MA), 1997.
- Fred in Love, University of Wisconsin Press (Madison, WI), 2005.
- Art and Sex in Greenwich Village: Gay Literary Life after Stonewall, Perseus Publishing, 2007.
- True Stories:Portraits From My Past, Chelsea Station Editions, 2011
- True Stories Too: People and Places From My Past, Chelsea Station Edition, 2014
- Nights at Rizzoli, OR Books, 2014

=== Poetry ===
- The Deformity Lover and Other Poems, Sea Horse Press (New York, NY), 1978.
- Window Elegies, Close Grip Press, 1986.

=== Anthology ===
- A True Likeness: An Anthology of Lesbian and Gay Writing Today (editor), SeaHorse Press (New York, NY), 1980.
- Ambientes: New Queer Latino Writing (co-edited with Lazaro Lima), University of Wisconsin Press (Madison: WI), 2011.
- Best Gay Stories 2012 (edited by Peter Dubé; story My Childhood Friend was chosen as one of 15 inclusions), Lethe Press 2012 ISBN 1-59021-387-4

=== Drama ===
- One O'Clock Jump (one-act play), produced Off-Off Broadway, 1985.
- Immortal (play with music; based on Picano's novella An Asian Minor: The True Story of Ganymede), produced Off-Off Broadway, 1986.
- The Bombay Trunk, produced in San Francisco, 2002.
- Ingoldsby, produced in Ann Arbor, Michigan, 2007

=== Screenplays ===
- Eyes, based on the novel of the same title (1986)
- Universal Donor (2003)
- Very Large Array (2007)
- Perfect Setting

=== Nonfiction ===
- The New Joy of Gay Sex, co-authored with Charles Silverstein, preface by Edmund White, HarperCollins (New York, NY), 1992, revised and expanded 3rd edition, illustrated by Joseph Phillips, HarperResource (New York, NY), 2004.
