= 1970s South Bronx building fires =

Destructive fires in New York City, US

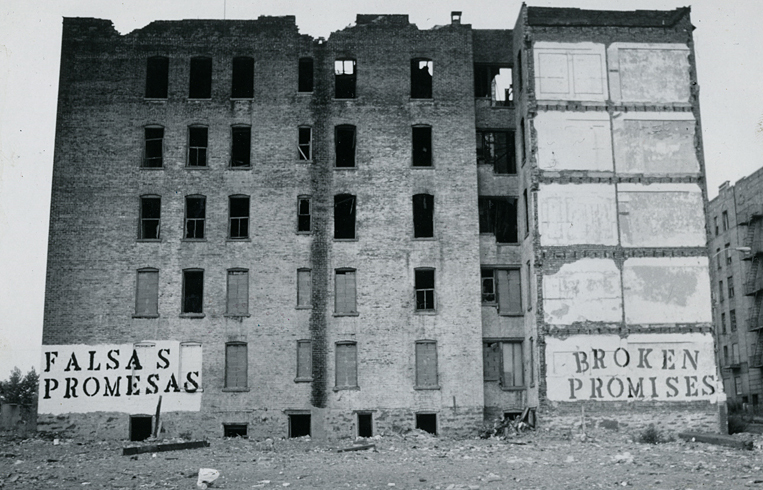
- A burned out building in the Bronx in 1980
- Date: ~1972–1984
- Location: South Bronx, New York City, U.S.
- Target: Unprofitable leased residential buildings
- Perpetrators: City and state politicians (cutting of crucial firefighting services); Banks (redlining); Landlords (building neglect, arson); "Urban renewal" and gentrification (policies forcing non-white residents into crowded parts of the Bronx)
- Outcome: Massive loss of housing
- Casualties: 200–400
- Displaced: 250,000

The 1970s South Bronx building fires, often referred to as simply the Bronx fires, were a series of fires that severely damaged the South Bronx and destroyed more than 80% of the housing units in the area. The Bronx fires were the most damaging case of the high rates of fire afflicting cities across America during the 1970s.

The South Bronx fires were not a singular, coordinated event; rather, the fires were the result of multiple socioeconomic factors and trends spanning several decades. These factors included but were not limited to redlining and housing segregation, the economic crises of the 1970s, failure of landlords to modernize properties, poor fiscal management by the city of New York, budget cuts targeted towards infrastructure in poor communities, the overcrowding of already-neglected areas due to displacement during gentrification, landlords burning buildings for newly available property insurance programs, and many others.

== Background ==
=== Demographic changes ===
By the end of World War II, many middle-class black and stateside Puerto Rican families had moved into the South Bronx from Harlem, as the Bronx was less populated and also legally integrated. However, many white Bronx residents left when non-white people moved in, fearing their properties would drop in value. The construction of Co-op City motivated further white flight by housing middle-class black and Puerto Rican residents in family-sized apartments. Finally, policies like Section 8 and rent control gave poorer Americans greater access to housing, with a majority of black and Latin Americans at that time previously not having had this access. As a result, the South Bronx went from being two-thirds non-Hispanic white in 1950 to being two-thirds black or Puerto Rican ten years later.

Just over a decade before, in 1938, maps published by the FHA designated many of the buildings in the Bronx as deteriorating. Despite many other parts of New York also needing similar renovation, the nationwide perception of the Bronx quickly began to change from one of industry to one of slum, motivated by prejudice towards communities of color.

As a result of these demographic changes, and in spite of an active and generally prosperous community, the South Bronx began to see reduced economic activity, as well as a decrease in funding for municipal services such as hospitals and public utilities. Many middle-class Jewish and Italian-Americans left the area in response to increased black and Latin residency, and landlords began to lose some of their higher-paying tenants, seeing less profit due to some of their units being rent-controlled. Businesses soon followed suit, as many of these businesses were owned by people who lived in and then left the area. Business-owners were also known to burn down their buildings. Withdrawal of insurance policies in so-called "high-risk" areas for commercial buildings also put pressure on firms and factories. Rapidly, market-rate housing was sold off, jobs disappeared, and former investors in the area sought to dump their assets before they further declined in value.

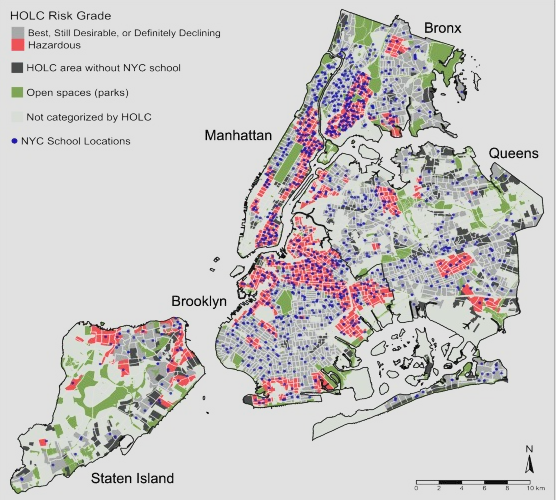
Redlining map of New York

Many began to see the area as an economic drain, nothing in particular that many of the newer South Bronx residents received some form of welfare (including Section 8), despite recipients also holding jobs. By the 1960s, many landlords had begun to completely neglect their buildings, and the area had been substantially redlined. The completion of the Cross Bronx Expressway in 1963 caused further inconvenience for the area, in some cases displacing entire neighborhoods. Combined with Robert Moses's urban renewal projects, the value of buildings in the Bronx dropped dramatically, businesses left, income levels dropped, and crime began to rise.

=== Population growth ===
Despite economic challenges, the South Bronx's population grew rapidly during the 1960s. Some of this was due to natural birth, but much of this growth was caused by the "urban renewal" project displacing residents from other parts of the city. Notably contributing to this push was Columbia University's rapid buy-up of low-income housing in Harlem, from which they evicted residents in order to create university dorms and housing. The rapid influx of displaced New Yorkers caused the South Bronx's population to surge by over 100,000 in just a few years, putting a massive strain on the area's resources, which had already started to be cut and defunded by the city.

=== City planning ===
After the production boom of World War II began to wane, New York City faced financial trouble. The city was described as "so broke" by the 1970s, with neighborhoods that had become "so desperate and depleted," that municipal authorities had to scramble for a solution. Some policymakers believed the process of population decline was inevitable, and instead of trying to fight decline, searched for alternative approaches; in many cases, this resulted in attempts to have the greatest population loss in the areas with the poorest and non-white populations.

From the onset these changes, Bronxites of color were working, contributing to the local economy, and strengthening their communities. As the economy of New York City began to crash, however, many residents of the South Bronx lost their jobs. The situation became so dire that, in some cases, Much of this was motivated by the aforementioned white flight, which had struck New York City as a whole; during the 1970s, eight hundred thousand people moved out of the city, massively draining tax revenue. In the decades prior, the city had seen massive economic and industrial growth due to its generous social programs; now, many business-owners who had benefited were leaving to avoid paying into them. When the resulting job loss raised the number of welfare recipients, the city decided that the solution was to cut social programs.

==== Planned shrinkage ====
Roger Starr, former head of New York City's Housing and Development Administration, proposed a policy for addressing the economic crisis, which he termed planned shrinkage. The plan's goal was to reduce the poor population in New York City and better preserve the tax base; according to the proposal, the city would stop investing in troubled neighborhoods, and divert funds to communities that could "still be saved." Starr suggested that the city "accelerate the drainage" in what he called the "worst parts" of the South Bronx, and encouraged the city to do so by closing subway stations, firehouses, and schools. According to its advocates, the planned shrinkage approach would encourage so-called "monolithic development," resulting in new urban growth at much lower population densities than the neighborhoods which had existed previously. However, the policy was seen by many as ultimately failing to address the underlying systemic causes responsible.

The ethics of this approach also came into question, with former mayor Abraham Beame disavowing the idea, and City Council members calling it "inhuman," "racist," and "genocidal." Abraham Beame soon dismissed Starr from his role in the HDA. On top of depriving the South Bronx of adequate fire service and protection, planned shrinkage heavily hurt public health as well. While the implementation of planned shrinkage policy was relatively short-lived, the impact of the policy changes would contribute to the fire epidemic.

==== RAND study and benign neglect ====
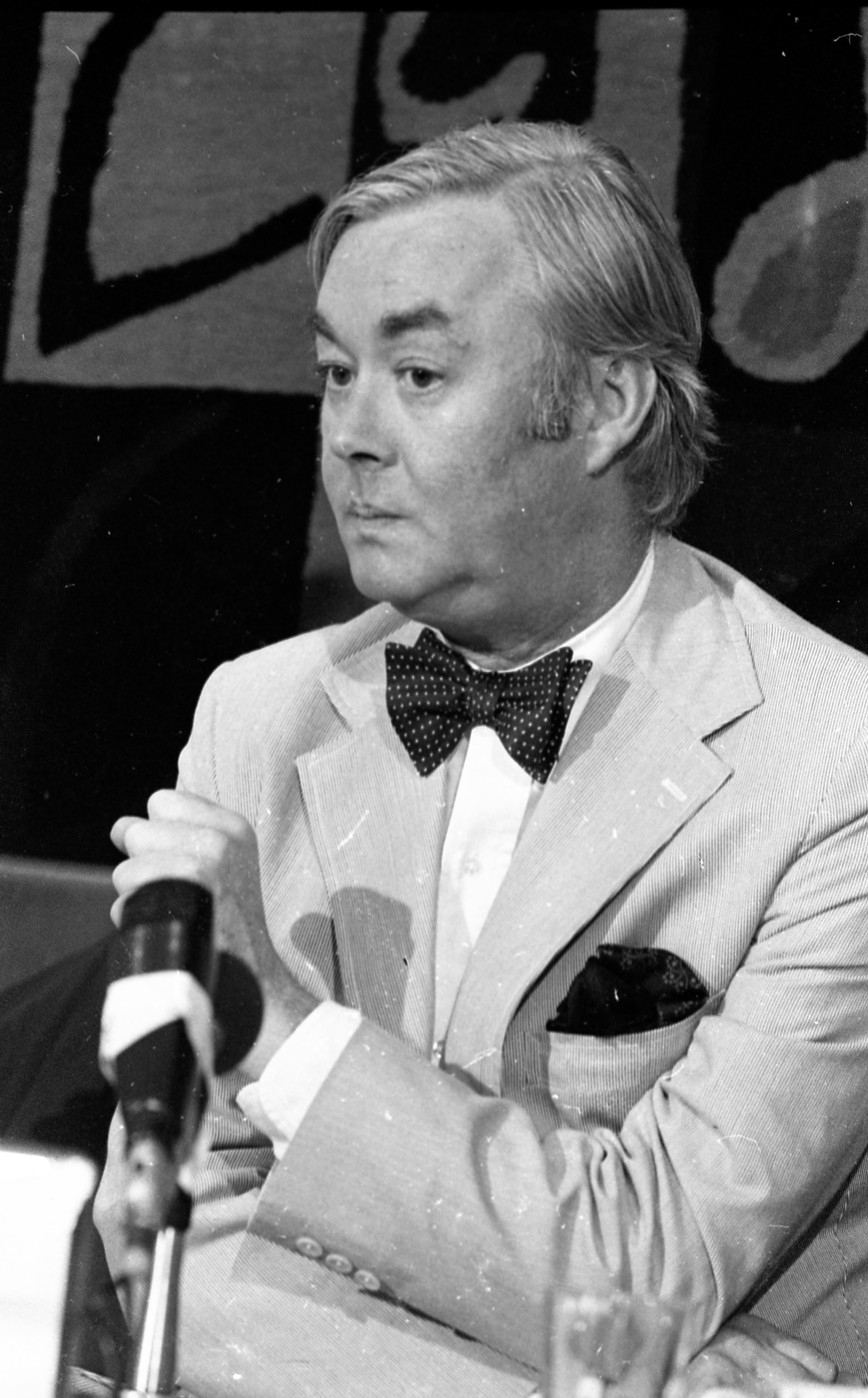
Senator Daniel Moynihan, who authored the controversial and heavily challenged Moynihan report in 1965.

In the early 1970s, a RAND study examining the matter concluded that many of the alarms in the Bronx were simply arson or false alarms. In order to justify the goal of planned shrinkage, the report therefore painted these fires as a "social pathology". This ideological justification built on existing prejudices established by reports such as the Moynihan Report, which argued that social issues facing black Americans were not systemic, but rather the result of black social and family organization in America.

The RAND report further accelerated the growing cultural trend of blaming individuals affected by policy for their poverty, rather than criticizing policies themselves. The RAND report in particular suggested that neighborhood fires were predominantly caused by socially- and ideologically driven arson, despite substantial evidence that non landlord-driven arson was not the major cause. According to the RAND viewpoint, the city should not invest any further funds into improving fire protection, a stance that had substantial impact on popular and political opinion.

The RAND report allegedly made its way to then-Senator Daniel Moynihan, author of the aforementioned report; Moynihan is said to have used the report's findings to make recommendations for urban policy, arguing that arson was one of many social pathologies caused by large cities, and suggested that a policy of "benign neglect" was the most appropriate response.

== The fires ==
=== Timeline ===
- 1960s: First wave of fires. Landlords sold their buildings to new people who chopped them up into smaller and smaller sections, and then neglected them, did not do necessary renovations, or even fill water boilers. Also, new electronics came into the home during this time, for which the buildings weren't built.
- 1968: First large fire.
- 1969: New York City begins targeting poor and dense areas for service reduction.
- 1972: Fires every 45 minutes.
- 1974–1976: 12 fire companies are closed in the South Bronx due to budget cuts and the near-bankruptcy of the city.
- Mid-1970s: the Bronx had up to 130,000 fires per year, or an average of 15 fires every hour. 40 percent of the housing in the area was destroyed, and the response time for fires also increased, as the firefighters did not have the resources to keep responding promptly to numerous service calls. According to one report, of the 289 census tracts within the borough of the Bronx, seven census tracts lost more than 97% of their buildings, with 44 tracts losing more than 50% of their buildings, to fire and abandonment.
- 1976: Investigators assigned to determine which fires were "natural" and which were arson.
- Late 1970s: More than 40 fires a day.
- 1977: A Bronx fire is accidentally televised during the 1977 World Series.
- 1977: President Jimmy Carter visits the Bronx.
- 1979: Anti-arson unit is developed.
- 1981: Fort Apache, The Bronx is released, further pushing negative stereotypes blaming Bronxites for the fires.
- 1982: A dedicated Bronx arson unit is finally created.
- Late 1982: The Anti-Arson Act of 1982 is signed into law by Ronald Reagan.
- 1986: Mayor Ed Koch funds a $4.4 billion program to rehabilitate 100,000 housing units affected by the fires and .

Between 2005 and 2020, there were about 10 large fires a year, with "large fire" referring to any fire requiring 6+ engine companies to control.

=== Attitudes of involved persons ===
Views towards the fires and the people affected by them were informed both by personal connections, and by societal bias and perception. Fires became so commonplace that residents and firefighters alike began to grow accustomed to them, and developed stronger feelings towards each other in the process. Firefighters often had negative views towards Bronxites of color, a view that was exacerbated by the fact that fire staff were almost entirely white. Firefighters were often described as showing apathy towards residents; one firefighter interviewed on Man Alive is quoted as saying "we have no sympathy, but we'll help". This view was influenced by public perception of Bronxites as well, since firefighters most often came from outside the Bronx, and federal funding for the South Bronx was seen as a waste. As a result of the comportment firefighters displayed, many Bronxites of color did not trust them, often seeing them as doing more damage than necessary.

Kids in particular shaped views of firefighters. In uncommon cases, children pulled fire alarms as pranks, wasting firefighter time. In other cases, kids were responsible for the fires themselves, although these examples were much rarer than public perception implied, and were most often due to the kids being paid to do so by landlords.

Bronx residents became heavily accustomed to the fires. In an interview with the Bronx photographers los seis, members commented that "building after building, block after block was disappearing," and that they "...grew up always smelling wood [and] metal burning," noting that Bronxites would "...always hear firetrucks zooming by at all hours of the night.”

=== Role of landlords ===
Landlords contributed to the problem both by neglecting their buildings, and by burning them down. In many cases, as buildings further deteriorated, landlords simply let their buildings decay while still collecting rent. As an added benefit to the landlord, burning older buildings and allowing erosion of decaying properties also helped other, better-maintained properties increase in value.

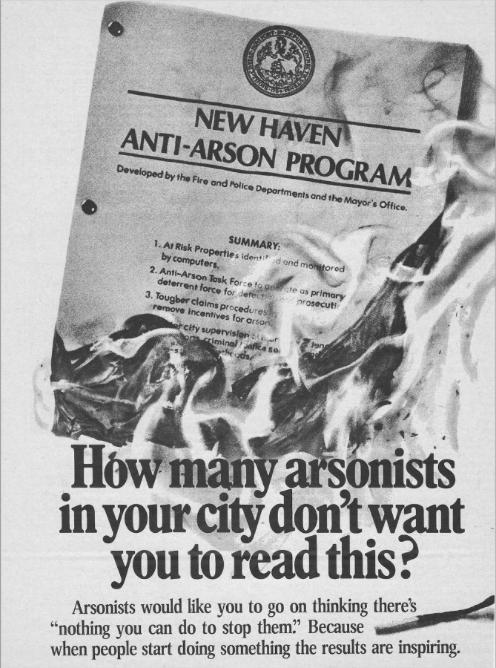
An ad that ran in Ebony magazine in 1979 by Aetna insurance.

Burning for insurance money was primarily driven by property owners who found that almost all of the property in the South Bronx had been redlined by the banks and insurance companies. Unable to sell their property at a good price and facing default on back property taxes and mortgages, some landlords began to burn their buildings for their insurance value. A type of sophisticated white collar criminal known as a "fixer" sprung up during this period, specializing in a form of insurance fraud that began with buying out the property of redlined landlords at or below cost, then selling and reselling the buildings multiple times on paper between several different fictitious shell companies under the fixer's control, artificially driving up the value incrementally each time.

Fraudulent "no questions asked" fire insurance policies, including from the New York FAIR Plan, would then be taken out on the overvalued buildings. The property would be stripped and burnt for the payoff from insurance companies, with one notable company being Lloyd's of London. This scheme became so common that local gangs (known as "strippers") were hired by fixers for their expertise at the process of stripping buildings of wiring, plumbing, metal fixtures, and anything else of value and then effectively burning it down with gasoline. Fixers were thus able to turn a profit by buying properties from struggling landlords, artificially driving up the value, insuring them and then burning them. Often, the properties were still occupied by subsidized tenants or squatters at the time, who were given little or no warning before the building was burnt down. They were forced to move to another slum building, where the process would usually repeat itself. The rate of unsolved fatalities due to fire multiplied sevenfold in the South Bronx during the 1970s, with many residents reporting being burnt out of numerous apartment blocks one after the other.

=== Role of residents ===
HUD and city policies also encouraged some local South Bronx residents to burn down their own buildings. Under then-regulations, Section 8 tenants who were burned out of their current housing were granted immediate priority status for another apartment, which would potentially be in a better part of the city. After the establishment of Co-op City, several tenants burnt down their Section 8 housing in an attempt to jump to the front of the 2–3 year long waiting list for the new units. Tenants who burnt their building often lived in housing that was in poor condition to begin with, and in many cases barely inhabitable. One woman interviewed by the Fifth Estate noted that her son had succumbed to cold during his infancy, due to her landlord's failure to repair holes in the building; such experiences motivated some tenants to burn their housing in hopes of something more livable.

The poor quality of housing also drove some tenants to refuse to pay rent altogether. Rent strikes in the Bronx initially started due to the exorbitant rises in rent from absentee landlords, but the practice of rent strikes soon spread to tenants of all neglected buildings, and led to periods where buildings remained untouched and rents unpaid for years on end.

=== Arson narrative ===
Throughout the 1970s, the predominant narrative was the one established by the RAND report. While arson was undoubtedly a factor, its scope and primacy are challenged by scholars of the topic. When looking at the broader trend of fires in New York City, Drs. Deborah and Roderick Wallace note that:

Fires in NYC have many causes: leaving a pot on the stove untended, over- loading an electrical outlet, careless disposal of matches and cigarette butts, improper storing of organic material leading to spontaneous combustion, piling up of building trash, children playing with matches or stoves, boiler malfunctions, elderly wiring, and deliberate fire setting. During the height of the fire epidemic of the Brooklyn neighborhood of Bushwick, we found that fewer than half the fires were deemed suspicious, let alone judged arson. All other fires had normal causes.

Of the fires resulting from arson, the majority were caused by landlords recruiting Bronx residents to start them. However, the number of residents involved in these policies was minute, and cannot be separated from the other factors facing the Bronx population.

Many landlords committed the arson directly. The first true "headline" of landlords committing arson would likely be the arrest of 8 landlords detailed in the New York Times in 1975. Among these were the highly publicized case of Imre Oberlander and Yishai Webber, two Brooklyn-based landlords who were caught driving to one of their buildings while wearing blackface, explosives in tow. Critically, none of these landlords were black or Latino. The landlords profited greatly off their insurance policies; Oberlander, for example, had collected $125,000 (over $750,000 in 2026) in payouts from twenty-one separate fires between 1970 and 1975.

== Responses ==
=== Local response ===
Initially, residents applied to the city for funds, but were often ignored. By the end of the 1970s, Bronxites had begun to rebuild on their own, and began making recovery programs. Additionally, many of the buildings had been so long abandoned by landlords, and changed hands so many times, that the true owner was no longer known. As such, many Bronx residents felt that repairing a building would ultimately make it theirs, as a product of the "sweat equity" put in. Groups such as the People's Development Corporation, formed in 1975 by Ramon Rueda, worked to "train residents to rebuild their own neighborhood... harnessing government work programs, available grants, and abandoned buildings." The PDC was one of many groups that formed during the time; other rehabilitation groups of the 1970s and early 1980s included BronxWorks (1972), the Northwest Bronx Community and Clergy Coalition (1974), the Fordham Bedford Housing Cooperation (1980), the Banana Kelly Community Improvement Association (1982), and ¡Nos Quedamos! (1982).

Of particular note were Mid-Bronx Desperadoes, a large organization of groups from multiple Bronx neighborhoods that advocated for investment in housing and services in the Bronx; their actions contributed massively to eventual investment in the area by the end of the 1980s.

During this same period, gangs formed, and were looked to for protection by Bronx residents. However, some argue that gang activity encouraged further white flight, prolonging the crisis.

=== State response ===
By the 1980s, in line with president Reagan's goal of privatization, many New Yorkers felt that the best approach to solving the housing crisis was to privatize housing in the Bronx. This movement was spearheaded by Mayor Ed Koch. Ultimately, arson rates did decline, but over the next four decades, the investment led way for the process of gentrification to slowly begin.

=== National response ===
On a national level, politicians were seen by Bronxites as dragging their feet. However, the city of New York was already seen by the rest of the country as a massive drain. These mentalities were encapsulated by the infamous but misleading "Ford to City: Drop Dead" headline ran by the Daily News in 1976. Just a year earlier, president Ford exacerbated the NYC budget cuts by refusing to send aid to the city. The fires in the Bronx soon became a national discussion, however, when ABC's aerial camera panned out over the stadium into the Bronx during the 1977 World Series, showing 60 million viewers a burning apartment building.

In the aftermath, President Carter went to the Bronx and made promises for recovery. Many other politicians visited the South Bronx to make political points, but this was largely seen as being for show.

==== "The Bronx is Burning" ====
The phrase "The Bronx is burning" is often attributed to Howard Cosell during Game 2 of the 1977 World Series featuring the New York Yankees and Los Angeles Dodgers. During the game, as ABC switched to a helicopter shot of the exterior of Yankee Stadium, an uncontrolled fire could clearly be seen burning in the area surrounding the park. Many believe Cosell then said "ladies and gentlemen, the Bronx is burning," but review of the game footage shows that he did not say this. Both commentators did touch on the fires, but the words used by the two broadcasters during the game were later "spun by credulous journalists" into the now ubiquitous phrase without either of them actually having phrased it that way.

President Ronald Reagan also visited the Bronx during his 1980 run for president, but his words quickly drew hostility from the crowd he spoke to.

== Resolution ==
A decline in fires was only possible once four needs were met: adequate housing that tenants did not want to leave, modernized equipment that was not at risk of ignition, the ability to safely combat fires when they occurred, and critically, the lack of ability for landlords to make more money by burning their properties. Private and state investment helped address the first three points, by building new housing, renovating existing units, and creating an arson unit to address fires as they occurred. All of these were only possible as a product of public understanding that arson was preventable by ending its profitability to landlords.

=== Changes in public perception ===
As soon as the broader public began to catch wind of arson as a crime perpetrated by landlords, pressure mounted for legislatures to address the broken payout system. The idea of arson for profit began to gradually replace the previously held idea of natural decay and arson due to disorder around 1974; by 1976, arson claims were on the decline.

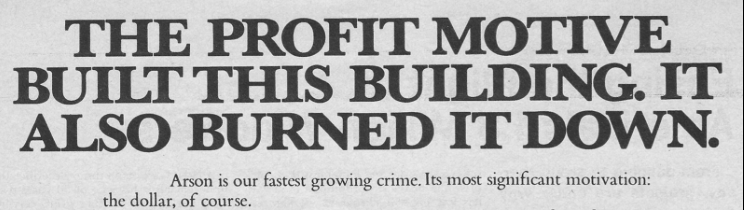
A 1977 ad by Traveler's Insurance.

These changes were notable for eventually leading to the creation of multiple anti-arson task forces. Also noteworthy was the later introduction of § 11-2801 Claims against fire insurance proceeds, which made it more difficult for landlords to simply collect insurance money and walk away; outstanding balances to the city had to be paid off with insurance proceeds, and money had to be put into restoring housing to the condition that it was in prior to the fire.

In Assemblyman Leonard Silverman's 1977 memorandum in support of the legislation, it was stated that "Arson is an increasing problem within the state, and studies indicate that a significant number of fires are set for profit. This bill is an effort to remove some of the profit by limiting the proceeds of insurance policies to those sums in excess of the amount already due but unpaid to the municipalities of the state on real property taxes. In addition, the cost to the municipality for removal of a safety hazard by demolition is to be recaptured from the proceeds." In an August 5, 1977 letter to the Governor the Commissioner of Commerce stated: "The bill will enable taxing districts to collect taxes due where a fire destroys taxed premises, and will prevent owners of such premises from collecting all the insurance, then abandoning it, leaving it to the taxing district to pay for its eventual wrecking and removal." Additionally, many insurance companies now refused altogether to insure buildings that were at higher risk of landlords intentionally burning for arson.

Once state policy had shifted towards preventing arson, there was a remarkable decrease in cases. As summarized in Bench Ansfield's "Born in Flames," the ASF (Arson Strike Force) was formed in 1978, and soon predicted the majority of arsons:

Using the algorithmic models developed by STOP in Boston, ASF researchers undertook a two-year study of twenty thousand buildings, evaluating data from the FDNY, the NYPIUA, the Department of Housing Preservation and Development, the Department of Finance, the Department of City Planning, Consolidated Edison, and the Human Resources Administration. The result was the Arson Risk Prediction Index, which was able to predict with 80 percent accuracy whether a building would be torched. Once a high-risk building was identified, ASF agents contacted its owners directly, alerting them that their building was under surveillance.

=== Private investment ===
Further beneficial was the Northwest Bronx Fire and Arson Prevention Project (FAPP), which was formed to target buildings for which reinvestment might prevent further cases of arson. Due in large part to funding from insurance companies like Aetna and Allstate, which had previously "talked the talk" and done little else to address the rampant arson, FAPP was able to secure investments to modernize many at-risk apartments with updated appliances, weatherization protections, and more energy-efficient facilities. This was one of many cases of private investment in the South Bronx improving the lives of residents.

Also notable in pushing investment in the South Bronx was Ed Logue. Ed backed the creation of Charlotte Gardens, a set of 90 prefabricated, single-family homes that were scaled-down suburban in design, and ensured that each home cost less than $50,000 through the use of federal subsidization. The houses were ranch-style homes with three bedrooms and 1.5 baths, sized at 1,152 square feet and with a full basement. Buyers were expected to put 10%, or $5,000, down, amounting to about $12,000 in 2020. Buyers also agreed to hold onto their homes for at least 10 years. Despite massive skepticism that there would be any interest in these homes, a waitlist of over 2,000 people formed, with all 90 homes eventually going to lower-middle class Bronx residents, largely black and Latino, who had never previously owned homes.

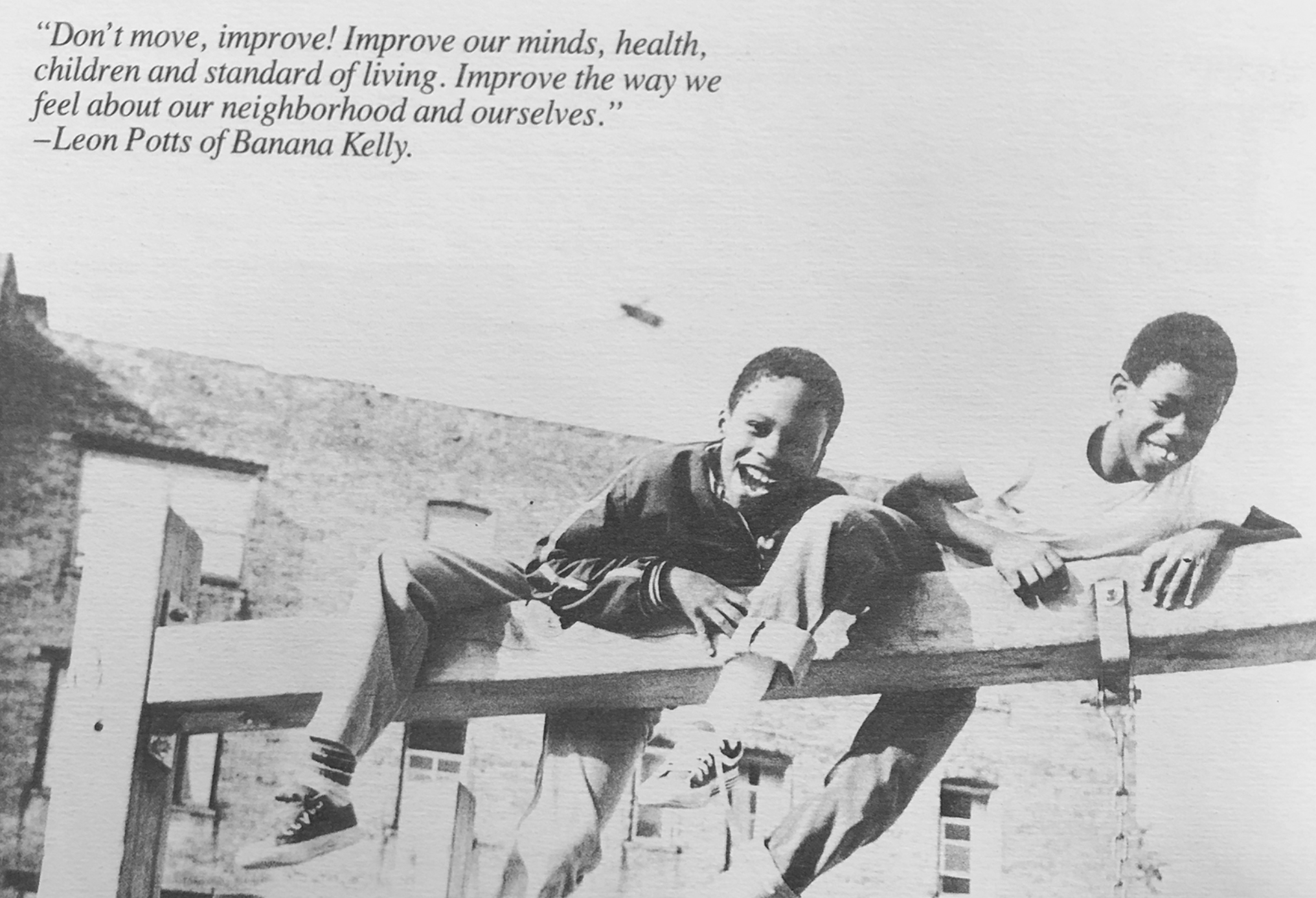
An ad by Banana Kelly urging Bronxites to stay in their community and improve it, despite the neglect of the government.

State funding and private investment were critical in helping the South Bronx rebuild, but these investments were the product of a massive amount of effort, organization, and self-investment by the already-existing community in the Bronx. Community groups such as the People's Development Corporation and Banana Kelly Community Improvement Association targeted investments and grants from the city, which were granted to promising cases of the aforementioned sweat equity. Banana Kelly in particular was so successful that they were able to build multiple new buildings through state and federal grants. Banana Kelly's slogan of "Don't Move, Improve!" also galvanized a focus on restoring damaged properties, which would encourage federal and state investment in support of restoration.

As this success grew, more and more community members got involved, further bolstered by community-building as a product of growing social movements and the newly-sprouting rap scene.

=== Role of the church ===
Author Jill Jonnes is quoted as saying that the “Catholic Church saved the South Bronx.” In a New York Times article from 1997, an interviewed community member said that, "The only thing that keeps [the Bronx] alive is Father Flynn. He is literally the father of this community." In 1980, Mother Theresa visited a soup kitchen in the Bronx on its opening day, although she spoke nothing of the fires themselves or their impact."

Notable among religious figures involved was Father Louis Gigante and his investments into the Bronx. While controversial in his personal and philanthropic life, his founding of the South East Bronx Community Organization (SEBCO) was instrumental in helping rehabilitate the area. By 1981, Gigante had helped build or restore over 1,000 apartments in Hunts Point.

In the years since the fires' peak, the role of the church has remained strong, and has expanded to include multiple other denominations.

== Aftermath and challenges to recovery ==
By the end of the 1980s, massive changes had taken place in the Bronx. New developments had improved the economic situation: buildings were remodeled, Roosevelt Gardens had reopened, the Grand Concourse had been renovated, and the Koch Housing Plan put nearly ten billion dollars into restoring or building homes in New York, with more than a third of that housing being in the Bronx. However, these years also saw multiple massive events that disproportionally hit black and Latin communities, such as the crack epidemic and the AIDS crisis.

Furthermore, the success of local residents and outside investors in renovating the South Bronx was so successful that the area began to gentrify. As a result, despite an impressive level of development, recovery, and reinvestment in the Bronx since the 1980s, the borough still faces a number of socioeconomic challenges, and remains lower-income than the rest of the city.

Data from the New York City government's assessment of tuberculosis and AIDS in NYC between 1979 and 1984, showing its disproportionate impact on black and Latin residents.

=== AIDS and tuberculosis ===
Aided in large part by the conditions resulting from (and contributing to) the fires' devastation, multiple infectious diseases spreading around New York in the 1980s and 1990s hit the Bronx particularly hard. In particular, the city of New York noted that cases of tuberculosis were soaring in predominantly black and Latin areas.

One of the major reasons for the disproportionate impact of tuberculosis in the South Bronx was overcrowding. As noted above, housing overcrowding caused tuberculosis rates to surge, due to the loss of housing units crowding people together.

In 1978, the tuberculosis epidemic had yet to fully hit the Bronx; just three years later, the South Bronx was in top quintile, and soon, the entire Bronx was affected by the tuberculosis epidemic. Cuts to public health facilities and the rise of HIV further facilitated this epidemic.

The epidemic began to ebb in 1993, resulting in an accompanying fall of HIV cases, rates of violent crime, and low-weight birth rates. However, the overcrowding issue persisted. While the Bronx middle class left certain areas because of overcrowding, many of the apartment buildings were still densely occupied; additionally, former senator Dale Volker's high-interest policies resulted in mortgage rates that were too high to allow many homeowners to move out of the Bronx by buying housing elsewhere.

=== 2008 recession ===
Private investment reflected the benefits and drawbacks to recovery through a free market as opposed to primarily government intervention. The subprime mortgage crisis of 2007 (which led to the housing crisis behind the 2008 recession), also hit the Bronx uniquely hard, and for many of the same reasons. In this case, the predatory nature of the subprime loans by various banking firms, which targeted black and Latin Americans who were often duplicitously led into signing for unrealistically high mortgages, left firms with a bulk of loans they did not expect to ever mature. Just as investors had discarded their property when black and Latin populations moved in, predatory lenders were incentivized to surreptitiously discard their subprime holdings (typically by dishonestly bundling them with other, better-rated mortgages) as the market turned.

=== Low birth weight ===
A significant long-lasting impact of the housing loss as a result of the fires is low-weight births. In additional to being associated with maternal stress, institutional racism, and lack of access to proper nutrition (factors which already existed in the South Bronx), there is a direct correlation between low-weight births and housing loss.

As low birth weight leads to many health complications over time, the trend led to further health problems even after the fires had been largely subdued. In 2025, rates of low birth weight were still higher in the Bronx than any other borough in New York City.

=== Asthma and air quality ===
The South Bronx's air was heavily polluted by the fires. To this day, it has one of the nation's highest rates of asthma, and Mott Haven is often referred to as "asthma alley," a term originally coined by Jeffery Klein in his 2001 report on asthma to the city. There have been substantial efforts to clean up the Bronx's air, but as much as 30% of the modern contribution to asthma comes from truck and car pollution from massive nearby highways. Not unlike the initial causes of the Bronx's decay, these highways can be linked to Robert Moses' earlier development in the area.
