= Paul Rogers =

Paul Rogers may refer to:

- Paul Rogers (academic) (born 1943), professor of peace studies at the University of Bradford
- Paul Rogers (actor) (1917–2013), English actor
- Paul Rogers (basketball) (born 1973), Australian basketball player
- Paul Rogers (bassist) (born 1956), English bassist
- Paul Rogers (film editor), American film editor
- Paul Rogers (footballer) (born 1965), English football (soccer) player
- Paul Rogers (novelist) (1936–1984), American novelist
- Paul Rogers (politician) (1921–2008), American lawyer and politician
- Paul D. Rogers (fl. 1980s–2020s), U.S. Army Major General and Michigan's 34th State Adjutant General

== See also ==
- Alfred Paul Rogers (1873–1959), American orthodontist
- Franklin Paul Rogers (1905–1990), American tattoo artist
- Paul Rodgers (born 1949), singer
- Paul Rodgers (footballer) (born 1989), English football player
