= Paul Reid =

Paul Reid may refer to:

- Paul Reid (actor) (born 1980 or 1981), New Zealand actor
- Paul Reid (artist) (born 1975), Scottish painter
- Paul Reid (footballer, born 1968), English association footballer from Oldbury
- Paul Reid (footballer, born 1982), English association footballer from Carlisle
- Paul Reid (public servant) (born 1964), former director-general of the Irish Health Service Executive
- Paul Reid (soccer, born 1979), Australian association footballer
- Paul Reid (writer) (fl. 1990s), American writer and biographer
- Paul Dennis Reid (1957–2013), American serial killer
- Paul Reid (born 1982), Australian rapper and musician known professionally as Drapht
- Paul Reid (fl. 1970s), American pianist with the Arthur Lyman Group

== See also ==
- Paul Read (disambiguation)
- Paul Reed (disambiguation)
