= Urban shrinkage =

Urban shrinkage can refer to:

- Shrinking cities, cities facing a significant drop in population
- Planned shrinkage, an urban planning philosophy to deliberately reduce city services to encourage reduced population
- Shrink to survive, an urban planning response to a shrink city that converts abandoned neighborhoods into rural land
