= Patrick Roscoe =

Canadian writer

- Born: 1967 (age 58–59); Salobrena, Spain
- Occupations: short story writer, novelist
- Writing career
- Period: 1980s-present
- Notable works: Birthmarks, God's Peculiar Care, The Lost Oasis

Patrick Roscoe is a Canadian novelist, short story writer and actor.

== Early years ==
Roscoe was born in Trail, British Columbia, Canada and grew up in Tanzania, England, Port Hardy, Victoria and Vancouver. Roscoe moved from Canada to California in 1981. He later lived in Toronto, Seville, and Madrid.

== Career ==
His first book, Beneath the Western Slopes, was released by Stoddart in 1987.

Birthmarks, published in 1990, was noted for its unconventional subject matter, addressing themes of loneliness, desperation and survival among prostitutes, gay men and drug addicts who were living on the margins of conventional society.

On the promotional tour for Birthmarks, he received publicity for claims of having previously worked as a male prostitute. He later disavowed the prostitution claim, telling The Globe and Mail in 1991, "I thought, if I'm going to do [the book tour], I'm going to act, I'm going to become one of the characters in the book, I'm not going to tell anything that's the truth because that's none of (the interviewer's) business." He has claimed to have no friends, no hobbies, no spouse, no lovers, no children, and no interests outside writing, regarding isolation as being important to him as a writer. While living in Madrid in 1991, he told The Globe and Mail that although he wrote in English, he spoke only Spanish in his daily life and told no one that he was a writer, passing instead as a student of Spanish.

Despite the uncertainty about Roscoe's own sexual orientation raised by his disavowal of the prostitution claims and the relative lack of similar themes in his later work, the LGBT themes in Birthmarks have made it an important milestone in the history of LGBT literature in Canada; it is the subject of an essay by Andy Quan in the 2010 book The Lost Library: Gay Fiction Rediscovered.

In his 1991 novel, God's Peculiar Care, Roscoe imagined a group of misfits obsessed by the tragic life of actress Frances Farmer. The Edmonton Journal called Roscoe "a real humdinger of a young writer." The Calgary Herald called him "prodigiously gifted."

He released a short story collection, Love Is Starving for Itself, in 1994 and a second novel, The Lost Oasis, in 1995. Another short story collection, The Truth About Love, followed in 2001, and the novel The Reincarnation of Linda Lopez appeared in 2003. The Laboratory of Love, released in 2013, was his first book in a decade.

Stephen Henighan discusses Roscoe as one of a group of writers whose stories "eschew historical participation in favour of a turning inward or a retreat into a kind of eternal present."

== Awards ==
In 1996, he won a Western Magazine Award for his short story "The Last Casanova of Regina", originally published in Grain.

In 2008, he was one of 10 finalists in the Okanagan Short Story Contest.

He won first place in the short-story division of CBC Radio's literary competition in 1990.

== Bibliography ==
- Beneath the Western Slopes (1987, short fiction)
- Birthmarks (1990, short fiction)
- God's Peculiar Care (1991, novel)
- Love is Starving for Itself (1994, short fiction)
- The Lost Oasis (1995, novel)
- The Truth About Love (2001, short fiction)
- The Reincarnation of Linda Lopez (2003, novel)
- The Laboratory of Love (2013, short fiction)
- "The Indivisible Heart" (2015, novel)
