= Paul Reed =

Paul Reed may refer to:

- P. Booker Reed (1842–1913), mayor of Louisville, Kentucky
- Paul Reed (artist) (1919–2015), American artist
- Paul Reed (basketball) (born 1999), American basketball player
- Paul Reed (actor) (1909–2007), American actor
- Paul Reed (writer) (1956–2002), American writer
- Paul Reed Smith (born 1956), luthier and founder of PRS Guitars

== See also ==
- Paul Reid (disambiguation)
- Paul Read (disambiguation)
