= Charles Nelson (writer) =

American writer

- Born: 1942; Pittsburgh, Pennsylvania
- Died: 2003 (aged 60–61)
- Occupation: Writer
- Writing career
- Genre: fiction
- Notable work: The Boy Who Picked the Bullets Up

Charles Nelson (1942 - 2003) was an American writer, best known for his 1981 novel The Boy Who Picked the Bullets Up.

Originally from Pittsburgh, Pennsylvania, he moved to DeLand, Florida with his family at age 12 and later graduated from Stetson University. He served as a medic in the United States Marine Corps during the Vietnam War.

He published The Boy Who Picked the Bullets Up in 1981. The novel centered on Kurt Strom, a gay former baseball player serving as a Marine medic in Vietnam, and is considered an important milestone in the history of both gay literature and Vietnam War literature. The novel had been rejected by 13 publishing companies due to its gay content before being accepted for publication by William Morrow and Company. During the book's promotional tour, he told media that the novel was "25 per cent autobiographical", but refused to specify which 25 percent.

He later published Panthers in the Skins of Men, a sequel novel about Kurt Strom's readaptation to post-military life in the United States, in 1989. Both novels took their titles from the poetry of Arthur Rimbaud; the first was an epistolary novel. At the time of the original publication of The Boy Who Picked the Bullets Up, he also had an outline planned for a third Kurt Strom novel, but it remained unpublished at his death, of colon cancer, in 2003.

Nelson was still living in DeLand as of 1992, according to Kevin McCarthy's book The Book Lover's Guide to Florida, and died there in 2003. Despite writing about a gay protagonist partially based on his own experiences in Vietnam, none of the known biographical sources about Nelson clarify whether he ever personally identified himself as gay.

The Boy Who Picked the Bullets Up is the subject of an essay by Jim Marks in the 2010 non-fiction anthology The Lost Library: Gay Fiction Rediscovered.
