= Making Room =

Housing policy

Making Room is an approach to housing policy that seeks to match a city's housing stock with the needs of its households. It was coined in 2009 by Citizens Housing and Planning Council (CHPC), a New York City-based research and education organization.

== Defining elements ==
The Making Room approach comprises four key areas of scrutiny:

1) How a city's population is really grouping itself into households; breaking with the traditional methodology that connotes household with family. 2) The type of people that a city hopes to attract in the future, and their likely lifestyles and housing needs. 3) Best Practice regarding the design of homes and apartments seen across the world. 4) The revision of possible zoning, planning, subsidy, building code controls so that the development of certain housing models is allowed and encouraged.

== Examples and impact ==
The Making Room approach was utilized by New York City under the Mayoralty of Michael Bloomberg when the city government launched a pilot to develop a building of microapartments in Kips Bay, Manhattan in response to the growing single population.

The Making Room approach was featured in its own museum exhibition at the Museum of the City of New York in 2013.

=== Topics ===
- Affordable housing
- Architecture
- Building code
- Human factors and ergonomics
- List of housing types
- Workforce housing
- Zoning
