= Ambidextrous (novel) =

1985 book by Felice Picano

Ambidextrous: The Secret Lives of Children
- Author: Felice Picano
- Language: English
- Genre: Autobiographical novel
- Publisher: Gay Presses of New York
- Publication date: 1985
- Publication place: United States
- Media type: Print (hardcover & paperback)
- Pages: 195 pp.
- ISBN: 0-914017-06-3

Ambidextrous: The Secret Lives of Children is a 1985 novel by American author Felice Picano. The book is a semi-autobiographical account of the author's life growing up in the 1950s. Major themes include adolescent sexuality and coming out.

When it was first published, the novel was perceived as so scandalous in Great Britain that it was burned on arrival directly at the Liverpool docks. Still, or perhaps because of its reception upon release, the book has received classical status and has been re-released on more than one occasion, the latest release being in 2003.
