= Richard Hall (writer) =

American dramatist

- Born: Richard Walter Hirshfeld; November 26, 1926; New York City, New York
- Died: October 29, 1992 (aged 65)
- Occupation: Writer
- Writing career
- Genres: novels, short stories, drama
- Notable work: Couplings

Richard Hall (November 26, 1926 – October 29, 1992), sometimes credited as Richard Walter Hall, was an American novelist, playwright and short story writer.

== Background ==
He was born in Manhattan in 1926 as Richard Walter Hirshfeld to Jewish parents, who later changed the family's name to Hall after experiencing an antisemitic incident. Raised in Westchester County, Hall served in the United States Army during World War II, and was educated at Harvard University and New York University. He worked in advertising and public relations, and taught at Inter American University in San Juan, Puerto Rico in the 1970s.

== Writing career ==
His first novel, The Butterscotch Prince, was published in 1975.

As a book critic and essayist, he contributed to publications including The New York Times, San Francisco Chronicle, The Village Voice and The Advocate. He was the first openly gay critic ever admitted to the National Book Critics Circle.

His other published books included the short story collections Couplings (1981), Letter from a Great Uncle (1985) and Fidelities (1992), the novel Family Fictions (1991) and Three Plays for a Gay Theater (1983), a compilation of his stage plays Happy Birthday Daddy, Love Match and Prisoner of Love.

He died on October 29, 1992, in New York City, of AIDS-related causes. He was predeceased in 1989 by his longtime partner Arthur Marceau.

== Legacy ==
He posthumously won a Gaylactic Spectrum Award in 2005 for "Country People", a supernatural-themed short story originally from Fidelities which was republished in the 2004 anthology Shadows of the Night and adapted to a short film in 2019.

Couplings was the subject of an essay by Jonathan Harper in the 2010 non-fiction anthology The Lost Library: Gay Fiction Rediscovered.
