= Gaysweek =

American LGBTQ newspaper

- Editor: Alan Bell
- Categories: Newspaper
- Frequency: Weekly
- Founder: Alan Bell
- Founded: 1977
- First issue: February 28, 1977
- Final issue Number: 1979; 114
- Company: New York Gay News, Inc.
- Country: United States
- Based in: New York City
- Language: English
- Website: gaysweek.com
- ISSN: 0145-9104
- OCLC: 26280473

Gaysweek was an American weekly gay and lesbian newspaper published in New York City from 1977 to 1979. Considered the city's first mainstream weekly lesbian and gay newspaper, it was, at the time, one of only three weekly publications serving gay readers at the time.

== History ==
Gaysweek was founded by Alan Bell in 1977 and was the first mainstream gay publication founded and published by an African-American. In addition to news coverage, the newspaper featured interviews, reviews, fiction, poetry, gossip, entertainment listings, regular columns, and community calendars.

Gaysweek began as an eight-page, single-color tabloid and grew into a 24-page, two-color publication during its 114-issue run. Its monthly arts supplement, Gaysweek Arts and Letters, was edited by Byrne Fone and Richard Hall.

Although it was eventually granted, Gaysweek's application to the U.S. Patent and Trademark Office for registration of the Gaysweek trademark, was opposed by Newsweek, Inc. because, according to attorneys for the publication, they are similar "both phonetically and in appearance." Newsweek later sued Gaysweek for trademark infringement.

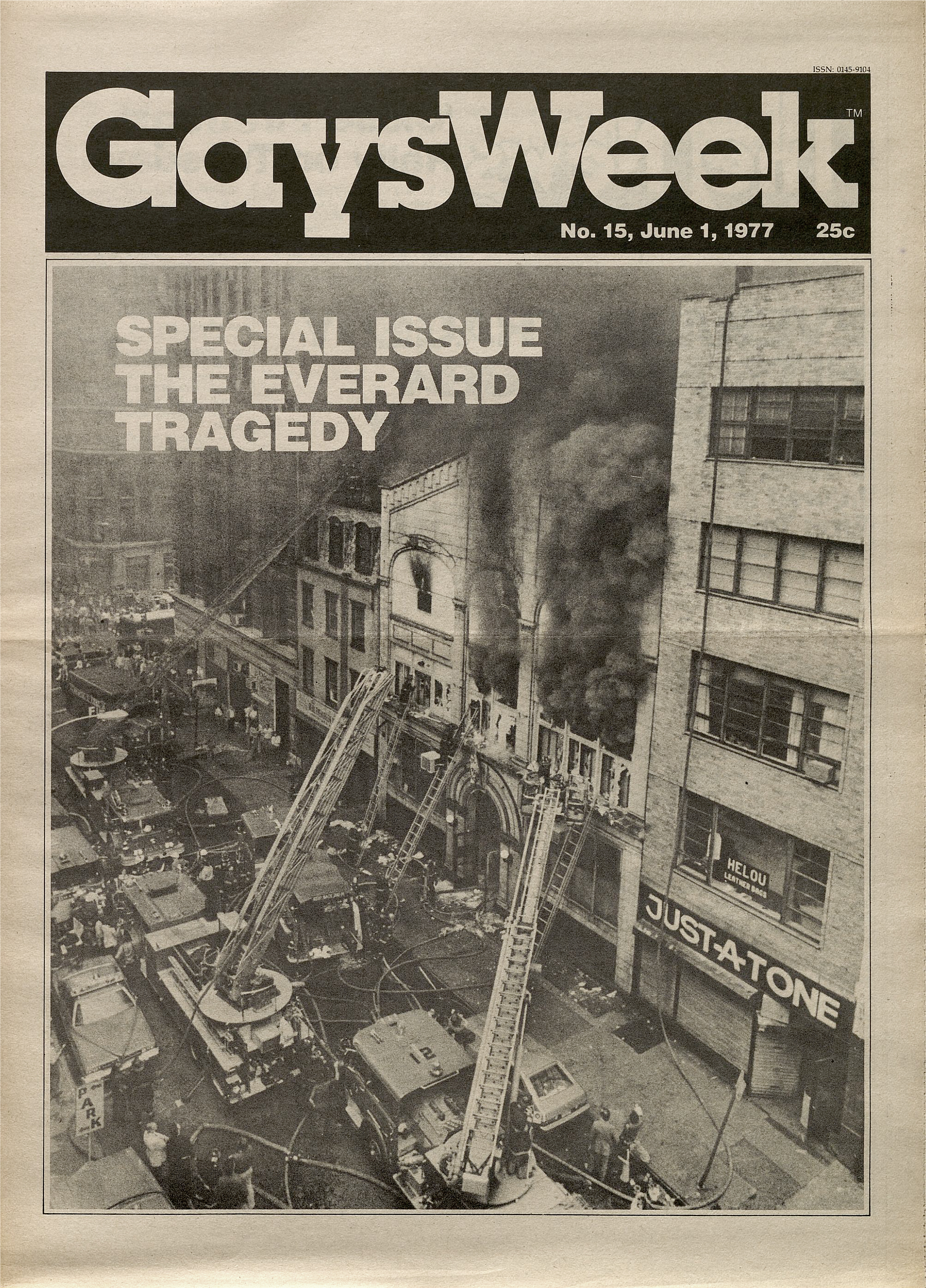
Gaysweek, June 1, 1977, Everard Baths Extra

Following the May 1977 Everard Baths fire, Gaysweek published a June 1 extra issue covering the tragedy, the community's response, and an editorial criticizing the failure to enforce building and fire safety regulations.

In 2002, the Roman Catholic Archdiocese of Boston turned over a copy of the February 12, 1979 issue of Gaysweek, in relation to a lawsuit, which included an article titled "Men & Boys" that described a meeting in Boston in which Father Paul Shanley defended a relationship between a man and a boy.

In 2015, Alan Bell was inducted into the LGBT Journalists Hall of Fame.

== Archives ==
A portion of Gaysweek's archives is housed in the Division of Rare and Manuscript Collections at Cornell University Library. The newspaper's surviving editorial records are also held by the Manuscripts and Archives Division of the New York Public Library as part of the International Gay Information Center Collection. The collection consists primarily of production make-up sheets with editorial corrections and printer's instructions, together with manuscripts, typescripts, press releases, mounted newspaper clippings, editorial correspondence, and book review manuscripts that document the newspaper's editorial and production process.

== Notable writers ==
Gaysweek published fiction, essays, criticism, interviews, reviews, and commentary by writers including:

- Eric Bentley
- Perry Brass
- Robert Chesley
- Daniel Curzon
- Martin Duberman
- Harvey Fierstein
- Larry Kramer
- Robert Patrick
- Felice Picano
- David Rothenberg
- Edmund White
- George Whitmore

== See also ==
- Bay Area Reporter
- BLK (magazine)
- Gay Community News (Boston)
- LGBT culture in New York City
- Out Front Colorado
- Washington Blade
