= Paul Read =

Paul Read may refer to:

- Paul Read (footballer) (born 1973), retired English footballer
- Paul Read (music producer), British recording engineer and music producer

== See also ==
- Paul Reid (disambiguation)
- Paul Reed (disambiguation)
- Paul Reade (1943–1997), English composer
