= Day Without Art =

Annual event to raise awareness of AIDS

Day Without Art (DWA) is an annual event where art institutions and other organizations organize programs to raise awareness of AIDS, remember people who have died, and inspire positive action. Initiated in 1988 by VisualAIDS from New York City (NYC), nowadays a global event.

== History ==
Day Without Art began on December 1, 1989 as the national day of action and mourning in response to the AIDS crisis, which had rapidly hurt the artistic community. Jane Alexander, the Chairman of the National Endowment of the Arts in 1993, describes the day as a "powerful symbol of the devastating effect of AIDS on the arts community. This day reinforces the vitality and power art brings to our daily lives by showing how the absence of art leaves a void of spirit." The day coincides with World AIDS Day, which began the year before in 1988. To make the public aware that AIDS can touch everyone, and inspire positive action, some 800 U.S. art and AIDS groups participated in the first Day Without Art, shutting down museums, sending staff to volunteer at AIDS services, or sponsoring special exhibitions of work about AIDS. Since then, Day With(out) Art has grown into a collaborative project in which an estimated 8,000 national and international museums, galleries, art centers, AIDS service organizations, libraries, high schools and colleges take part.

The memorial was initiated by a New York group called Visual AIDS, who spurred public actions and programs, published an annual poster and copyright-free broadsides, and acted as press coordinator and clearing house for projects for Day Without Art/World AIDS Day. In 1997, it was suggested Day Without Art become a Day With Art, to recognize and promote increased programming of cultural events that draw attention to the continuing pandemic. Though "the name was retained as a metaphor for the chilling possibility of a future day without art or artists", we added parentheses to the program title, Day With(out) Art, to highlight the proactive programming of art projects by artists living with HIV/AIDS, and art about AIDS, that were taking place around the world. It had become clear that active interventions within the annual program were far more effective than actions to negate or reduce the programs of cultural centers. In 2014, the Los Angeles art collective, My Barbarian, staged a video performance in remembrance of Pedro Zamora, inspired by the queer theorist, José Esteban Muñoz's theory of counterpublicity.

== Museum of Modern Art ==
In 1991, the Museum of Modern Art (MOMA) hosted an exhibition titled "A Space Without Art" to contribute to the Day Without Art movement in an effort to honor the artists lost to the ongoing HIV/AIDS epidemic. The exhibit featured empty frames which would have held drawings or photographs, canvases that were stretched and unused, bare sculpture bases, and 28 films and videos that covered topics such as safe sex and general information about the virus. Along with all of this, a bell tolled every ten minutes to symbolize another death from HIV/AIDS.

The significance behind the exhibit was to show how the art community had been affected by the epidemic and inspire onlookers to take part in the fight for change. Hosting a blank exhibit honored the work that could have been produced, but would never be as a result of the exponential deaths from the virus. The bell that tolled every ten minutes encouraged viewers to be reminded of how often a life was lost, and how that life could have been one of the artists featured in the empty gallery.

== Solomon R. Guggenheim Museum ==
In 1989, the Solomon R. Guggenheim Museum participated in Day Without Art by placing a large black sash over the body of the building. It served as a remembrance of the artists that were living with HIV/AIDS or had died as a result of it. The large sash was likened to a burial shroud, or an intervention that encouraged those entering the museum to be reminded of the ongoing epidemic that was affecting thousands of different people.

== New Zealand ==
The inaugural Day Without Art exhibition held in New Zealand opened on 1 December 1995, at the Southland Museum and Art Gallery. Curated by Wayne P. Marriott, the installation was undertaken by Daniel McKnight, Vicky Byrne and Marriott. In 1996 the Southland Museum and Art Gallery was awarded a New Zealand AIDS Foundation media award for its work in promoting a better understanding of the impact of HIV/AIDS on the wider community. The museum continued to annually host a Day Without Art exhibition until 1999.

== 2020 online live from NYC and elsewhere ==
In 2020, due to pandemic VisualAIDS organized online programming featuring commissioned diverse video works from different parts of the world and talks to authors. Programing was done in multiple languages and done both in NYC and around the world at different times in different time zones with different partner organizations.
