= The Violet Quill =

1980-81 American group of gay writers

The Violet Quill (or the Violet Quill Club) was a group of seven gay male writers who met in 1980 and 1981 in New York City to read from their writings to each other and to critique them. This group and the writers epitomize the years between the Stonewall Riots and the beginning of the AIDS pandemic. Andrew Holleran is the only surviving member.

== Importance ==
Several members became some of the most important Post-Stonewall gay writers in America, and the group's works established gay writing as a literary movement. Edmund White and Andrew Holleran in particular stand out.

== Members ==
The seven writers are:

- Christopher Cox (1949–1990)
- Robert Ferro (1941–1988)
- Michael Grumley (1942–1988)
- Andrew Holleran (b. 1944)
- Felice Picano (1944–2025)
- Edmund White (1940–2025)
- George Whitmore (1946–1989)

Between 1988 and 1990, AIDS claimed the lives of four of these men.

== History ==
Felice Picano recalls that the group started because straight editors, agents, and fellow writers weren't being helpful with advice on gay themed writing.

Gay fiction before the Violet Quill was of four classes. The first two were primarily or ostensibly for straight audiences: where the gay characters are minor to the main theme, or in which they live tragic lives and then die. The third was of high literary value and therefore valued by critics. The fourth was gay pornography.

== Selected works by the members of the Violet Quill ==
- Christopher Cox: A Key West Companion (1983)
- Robert Ferro: The Family of Max Desir (1983)
- Michael Grumley: After Midnight (1978)
- Andrew Holleran: Dancer from the Dance (1978)
- Felice Picano: An Asian Minor (1981)
- Edmund White: A Boy's Own Story (1982)
- George Whitmore: The Confessions of Danny Slocum (1980)
