= Visual AIDS =

New York-based art organization

Visual AIDS is an art organization based in New York City. Started in 1988, it is one of the first initiatives to record the impact of the AIDS pandemic on the artistic community. Art institutions and AIDS-related communities developed projects like Day Without Art, Night Without Light, The Banner Project, Postcards from the Edge, and the Red Ribbon Project. Artists include...

In 1988, New York curators and critics William Olander, Robert Atkins, Thomas Sokolowski, and Gary Garrels (then Director of Programs at Dia Art Foundation), created Visual AIDS, a loosely-organized coalition of arts professionals working to encourage discussion of the pressing social issues of the AIDS epidemic, with artist Patrick O'Connell as their founding executive director. Every year Visual AIDS presents the "Bill Olander Award" to art workers or artists living with HIV.

== Activities ==
VisualAIDS is helping produce artist projects, organizing exhibitions, public programs and publishing publications. It also runs Artist+ Registry & Archive Associate. In NYC Visual AIDS offers additional services like artwork photography, tours, and Art Therapy Workshops. As of 2013 VisualAIDS is also annually hosting an artist or a curator in residence. In 2020 Visual AIDS launched online platform, “Not Over” featuring rare videos and performances. They also commissioned short videos from different parts of the world that address different experiences of HIV/AIDS for the online program TRANSMISSIONS that premiered on the Day With(out) Art 2020.

The VisualAIDS Artist Files collection contains the artworks and papers of artists with AIDS and HIV from 1994. The organization also offers finding aids to assist with research.
