= Tom Cardamone =

American writer of speculative fiction

- Occupation: Writer
- Writing career
- Genre: Speculative fiction
- Notable work: The Lost Library: Gay Fiction Rediscovered (2010)
- Notable awards: Lambda Literary Award for Science Fiction, Fantasy and Horror (2013)
- Website: www.pumpkinteeth.net

Tom Cardamone is an American writer of speculative fiction. His published works include the anthology The Lost Library: Gay Fiction Rediscovered, the fantasy novels The Werewolves of Central Park and Green Thumb, the novella Pacific Rimming and the short story collection Pumpkin Teeth.

Openly gay, Cardamone is based in New York City.

He won a Lambda Literary Award for Green Thumb in 2013, in the speculative fiction category. Pumpkin Teeth was also previously nominated in the same category.

== Works ==
=== Novels ===
- The Werewolves of Central Park (20)
- Green Thumb (2012)
- Pacific Rimming (2013)
- The Lurid Sea (2018)

=== Collections ===
- Pumpkin Teeth (2009)
- Night Sweats (2016)
