= Paul Reid (artist) =

Scottish painter

Paul Reid (born 1975) is a Scottish painter who works in a figurative style. He was chosen by New Statesman as one of the Best of Young British under the age of 35, in 2002.

Critics have noted that his work tends to reject contemporary art's values, and instead harkens back to old masters such as Rembrandt and Caravaggio.
