= Paul Rogers (novelist) =

American novelist

- Born: c. 1936; Paul T. Rogers
- Died: September 1984 (aged 48); New York City, New York
- Occupation: Novelist
- Writing career
- Period: 1980s
- Notable work: Saul's Book

Paul T. Rogers was an American writer. His sole published novel Saul's Book, an account of the gay underground hustler scene in Times Square, was the winner of Pushcart Press's Editors' Book Award in 1981. The award, presented to unpublished manuscripts of quality which had been rejected by commercial publishers, included the novel's publication by Pushcart, which released Saul's Book in 1982; a paperback edition by Penguin Books followed in 1984. The novel had been rejected by 10 publishing companies before coming to Pushcart's attention.

Rogers released little biographical information to the media, acknowledging only that he was a former teacher and social worker and indicating in a preface to the paperback edition that he "knows first-hand the people and places found in [the] book".

On September 22, 1984, Rogers was found dead in his apartment by the superintendent of his apartment building. Two days later on September 24, charges of murder, robbery and conspiracy were laid against Christopher Rogers, the author's adopted son, and Nicholas Ondrizek, a drifter who had been staying with them. The pair reportedly beat him to death with a wooden plank, and then stole his wallet and bank card. The two pleaded guilty to the charges on October 9, 1985. Rogers was 48 years old at the time of his death, and according to his editor was gravely ill with cancer.

After his death, The Village Voice published an article stating that Rogers had essentially modelled the novel's titular Saul on himself, as Rogers was also an alcoholic and drug addict who was involved in both male prostitution and criminal embezzlement, and had written the book while serving a prison sentence.

Saul's Book was the subject of an essay by Paul Russell in the 2010 book The Lost Library: Gay Fiction Rediscovered.

== Works ==
- Saul's Book (1982)
