= An Asian Minor =

1981 novel by American author Felice Picano

An Asian Minor is a novel by Felice Picano in which he re-invents the myth of Ganymede. In Greek Mythology, Ganymede was the cup-bearer of Olympus and the beloved of Zeus, chief of the gods. In the novel, told in the first person from the viewpoint of Ganymede himself, he reveals that before Zeus became his lover Ganymede was erotically and amorously pursued by several other major deities. Ares, god of war, was too rough and violent. Hermes, god of thieves and tricksters, was too dishonest and deceitful. Only Zeus was able to satisfy Ganymede fully and fulfill a prophecy Ganymede received as a child.

First published by Seahorse Press in 1981, Lethe Press has re-released the novel in 2017: as a deluxe edition with a full-color homoerotic cover illustration; a paperback edition; audiobook; and e-book.

== See also ==
- Till We Have Faces
- The Persian Boy

== Sources ==
An Asian Minor by Felice Picano (1981), ISBN 0-933322-06-2
