= Roger Starr =

American intelligence officer (1918–2001)

Roger Starr (April 16, 1918 – September 10, 2001) was an intelligence officer during World War II, a businessman active in community organizations, and New York City housing administrator until his removal. He later became a writer for the New York Times. One of his books was titled The Living End (1966).

== Early life and education ==
Starr was born in Manhattan in New York City, on April 16, 1918. He attended Yale University as an undergraduate and joined the United States Army and the Office of Strategic Services during World War II where he challenged military segregation. Upon his return after the war he went to work as a writer for CBS. Starr took over his father's construction company in 1945; he ended his leadership role in the company in 1974.

== Career ==
In the mid 1950's, Starr joined the Citizens Housing and Planning Council, of which he became the executive director in 1958. Starr maintained the organization's advocacy for government role in development. His early political ideology leaned towards the teachings of Trotsky, developing into a supporter of the New Deal but later in life becoming a neoconservative.

Starr was appointed head of the New York City's Housing and Development Administration (HDA) in 1973 by Mayor Abraham Beame. In 1976, Starr proposed a "planned shrinkage" in New York: this is now more commonly known as municipal disinvestment. Starr wanted to accelerate the abandonment of certain neighborhoods such as the South Bronx by cutting support for their welfare programs, forcing inhabitants to move elsewhere. The shrinkage was seen as unhelpful to the solution of the underlying problem, which was flaws in the welfare system.

A number of comments by looters in the New York blackout also support Starr's observation that crime, such as arson, was rising in the urban areas he targeted with his shrinkage. This caused mass public outcry. Protesters would make disturbances when he appeared in public. New York City council members described the planned shrinkage as "inhuman", "racist", and "genocidal". Abraham Beame dismissed Starr from his role in the HDA within the year. Starr described his views on housing in his book America's Housing Challenge: What It Is and How to Meet It, which a reviewer said provided a "trenchant analysis" of the problems but described some of Starr's proposed solutions as "draconian". The same reviewer said that "everyone who reads the book will find the author's arguments well developed and expressed", showing that Starr's literature was well developed in places, even if his argument was judged as immoral. This review of his works claims Starr says that this subject (arguing for planned shrinkage) is difficult to discuss in an environment of housing policy-makers who take a liberal, optimistic view of people's behaviour. Starr's analysis of the then-current problems in the government's attempt to provide decent accommodation for the nation was described as "pessimistic". In contrast, another reviewer called the book "a handy summation of the wisdom of an expert".

The views expressed in Starr's 1985 book The Rise and Fall of New York City was described by one reviewer as "cranky"! The book went into detail on Starr's harsh opinions on welfare and its recipients. However, another reviewer called it a "a bold and insightful analysis".

Starr's book Housing and the Money Market was received quite favourably as a guide suitable for the general public.

== Selected publications ==
- Starr, Roger (January 1, 1966). The living end : the city and its critics. Coward-McCann, Inc. p. 284. ASIN B0006BNPPA.
- Starr, Roger (1971). "Which of the poor shall live in public housing?" (PDF). The Public Interest. Vol. 23. pp. 116–124.
- Starr, Roger (1975). Housing and the money market. Basic Books. p. 250. ISBN 978-0809025923.
- Starr, Roger (1977). America's Housing Challenge: What it is and how to Meet it. Hill and Wang. p. 130. ISBN 978-0809025923.
- Starr, Roger (June 11, 1985). The Rise and Fall of New York City. Basic Books. p. 258. ISBN 978-0465070312.

After the HDA, Starr wrote editorials for The New York Times, starting in 1977. He also contributed to the City Journal from its inception in 1990 and was its editor in 1992-3. Starr retired in 1992 and moved to Stroudsburg, Pennsylvania in the Pocono Mountains, where he took up fly fishing as a hobby.

== Death ==
In early 2001, Starr suffered a debilitating stroke. Later that year, on September 10, 2001, he died of pneumonia in Easton, Pennsylvania. He was survived by his second wife, Jody Ward Green, and his two sons Adam and Barnaby.
