= Paul Reed (writer) =

American novelist

- Born: Paul Richard Hustoft; May 28, 1956; San Diego, California
- Died: January 28, 2002 (aged 45); San Francisco, California
- Occupation: Writer
- Writing career
- Genres: fiction, memoir
- Notable works: Facing It, Longing

Paul Reed (May 28, 1956 – January 28, 2002) was an American writer, best known as one of the first major writers of HIV/AIDS-themed literature in the United States.

== Early life ==
Born Paul Hustoft in San Diego, California, his father died when he was a child and he later adopted his stepfather's surname Reed after his mother remarried. He was educated at California State University, Chico and the University of California, Davis.

== Career ==
He worked for Ten Speed Press in the 1980s, eventually becoming editor-in-chief of its Celestial Arts subsidiary. Diagnosed with ARC in 1987, he left the company in 1991.

Reed's 1984 novel Facing It was credited as the first major AIDS-themed novel. He also later published the novels Longing (1988) and Vertical Intercourse (2000), and the memoirs The Q Journal (1991), The Savage Garden (1994) and The Redwood Diary (2001). He cowrote the HIV treatment and prevention guide How to Persuade Your Lover to Use a Condom and Why You Should (1987), and published a collection of spiritual self-help essays for people with HIV, Serenity: Challenging the Fear of AIDS, from Despair to Hope (1987). He also wrote several works of safer sex erotica under the pen name Max Exander, including Safestud: The Safesex Chronicles of Max Exander (1985), Lovesex: The Horny Relationship Chronicles of Max Exander (1986), Leathersex: Cruel Affections (1994) and Deeds of the Night (1995).

== Death and legacy ==
Reed died on January 28, 2002, of AIDS-related complications. His final work, a compilation of his Max Evander writings titled Swollen, was published later the same year.

Longing was the subject of an essay by Bill Brent in the 2010 book The Lost Library: Gay Fiction Rediscovered.
