= Citizens Housing and Planning Council =

US non-profit organization

Citizens Housing and Planning Council (CHPC) is a 501(c)(3) non-profit research and education organization based in New York City focused on advancing public policies that support housing and neighborhoods.

== Mission ==
Citizens Housing and Planning Council mission, since 1937, is to develop and advance practical public policies to support the housing stock of the city by better understanding New York's most pressing housing and neighborhood needs. They undertake research that reveals New York's housing issues and write publications, develop web features, and hold events to educate people on the results of the research and recommendations for policy solutions. CHPC uses data analysis and data visualization to support housing.

== Activities ==
Citizens Housing and Planning Council was founded in 1937 by a coalition of intellectuals and activists who worked closely with Senator Robert F. Wagner in crafting the Housing Act of 1937 and its advocacy helped to encourage NYC to maintain economically integrated public housing, well located in neighborhoods with access to services and transportation.

During the 1940s and 1950s, CHPC warned against the ghettoization of the city's growing minority populations and supported litigation and legislation opposing racial discrimination in housing, advocated for development of low-rent and racially integrated housing in the face of local opposition, and fought against attempts to place public housing in isolated areas of the city devoid of basic services. CHPC also stressed the need for preserving and renovating low-rent private housing long before that concept became conventional wisdom.

CHPC's research helped to shape the City's policies regarding the large inventory of tax-foreclosed housing that was abandoned and left to decline in the 1970s and 1980s. In the 1990s and 2000s, CHPC provided the analysis and advice when the City sought to rethink its policies regarding tax foreclosure and privatization. This led to the successful preservation of this critical housing resource. They also focused on the City's growth, the transformation of the old industrial landscape into mixed-use areas, inclusionary zoning policies, the critical need to address parking, the actual impact and effects of gentrification, tax policies to encourage housing construction and affordability, the importance and impact of regional housing strategy, global best practice in affordable housing, and intervention after the global economic crisis.

Recently CHPC's Making Room initiative has launched a new approach to housing policy. This initiative spawned an exhibition at the Museum of the City of New York.

== Staff ==
CHPC's current executive director is Howard Slatkin. Previous executive directors have included Jessica Katz, Roger Starr and Clarence Stein.

== Archives ==
CHPC has amassed a vast archive of primary source documents, including:

- Early drafts of FDR's New Deal housing programs
- Surveys and reports, from the 19th century onwards, that led to the creation of the Tenement House Act, the establishment of the Tenement House Department, the subsequent creation of the Department of Housing and Buildings, and its later separation into two distinct agencies
- Surveys and reports that set out the details of the work of these departments
- Personal correspondence between CHPC board members and prominent public figures such as Eleanor Roosevelt, Robert Moses, Fiorello LaGuardia, Al Smith, and William O'Dwyer
- Rare government reports and memoranda
- Legislative debates
- Original site planning and neighborhood analysis for housing developments from the 1930s to the 1960s; particularly public housing
- Surveys from all decades detailing NYC neighborhood populations
- Original marketing brochures for developments
- The first tenant application forms for a variety of public housing sites and subsequent tenant opinion surveys
