= George Whitmore (writer) =

American poet (1945–1989)

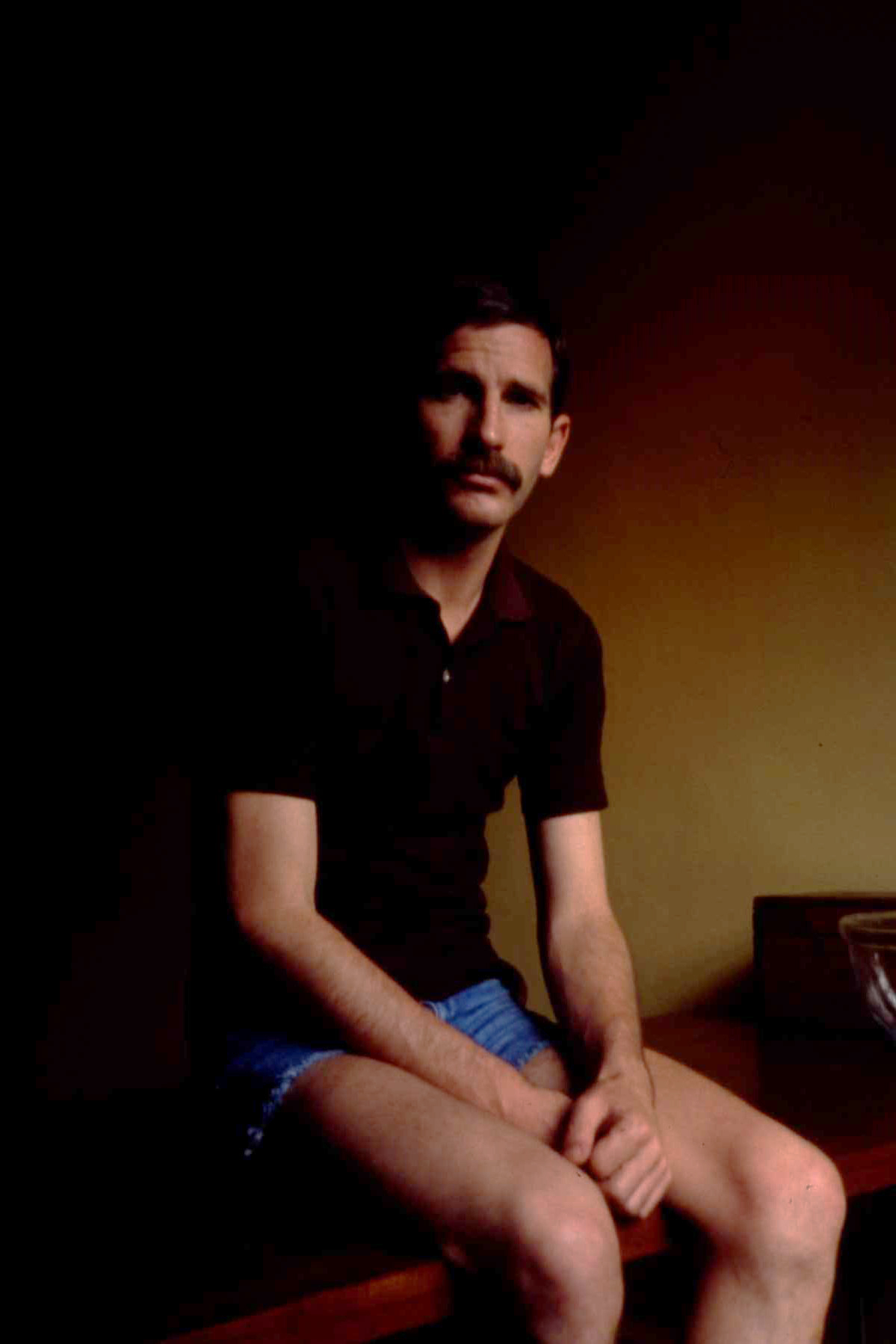
- George Whitmore, 1980
- Born: September 27, 1945; Denver, Colorado, U.S.
- Died: April 19, 1989 (aged 43); New York City, U.S.
- Education: MacMurray College; Bennington College
- Occupation: Author
- Partner: Michael Canter

George Davis Whitmore (September 27, 1945 – April 19, 1989) was an American playwright, novelist, and poet. He also wrote non-fiction accounts about homosexuality and AIDS.

== Early life ==
George Whitmore was born on September 27, 1945, in Denver, Colorado. His parents were Lowell Whitmore and Irene Davis.

Whitmore graduated from MacMurray College in 1967, where he "received a BA degree in English and Theatre", and he attended graduate school at Bennington College for one year.

== Career ==
A conscientious objector during the Vietnam War, Whitmore chose to work at Planned Parenthood in New York City (1968–1972) in lieu of military service. He then worked at the Citizens Housing and Planning Council of New York City from 1972 to 1981.

Whitmore emerged as an author in the context of the early gay literary movement that flourished in New York during the 1960s and 1970s. He wrote two books of poetry, three plays, and three novels. He also wrote for The New York Times Magazine, the New York Native, and Christopher Street. He was also the "contributing editor and literary critic" at The Advocate from 1974 to 1976. Whitmore was a member of The Violet Quill, the Gay Academic Union, and Gay Men's Health Crisis.

His writing explored taboos, homosexuality, disability, and coming of age.

In 1988, Whitmore and David Whittacre were awarded $47,000 after suing a Greenwich Village dental clinic for discriminating against them on the basis of their HIV status. The clinic shut down due to legal costs; although there were plans for it to be reopened as a nursing home for AIDS patients, this ultimately never happened.

== Personal life and death ==
Whitmore lived in Manhattan, and his longtime companion was Michael Canter. He died on April 19, 1989, at the New York University Medical Center.

== Works ==
=== Novels ===
- The Confessions of Danny Slocum (1980)
- Deep Dish (1980–1982)
- Nebraska (1987)

=== Plays ===
- The Caseworker (1976)
- Flight--The Legacy (1979)
- The Rights (1980)

=== Poetry ===
- Tricking. And Other Poems (1974)
- Getting Gay in New York (1976)

=== Non-fiction ===
- Someone Was Here: Profiles in the AIDS Epidemic (1988)
