= Christopher Cox (writer) =

American writer

- Born: Ray Cox Jr. 1949; Gadsden, Alabama, U.S.
- Died: 1990 (aged 40–41); Manhattan, New York, U.S.

Christopher Cox (August 27, 1949 – September 7, 1990), born Ray Cox Jr., was an American writer.

== Biography ==
Christopher Cox was born in Gadsden, Alabama. At 16, he worked for conservative Senator John Sparkman as a page, but would later found a local chapter of Students for a Democratic Society at the University of Alabama.

In the 1970s, he moved to Manhattan and pursued a career with the SoHo Weekly News as both a writer and photographer. Cox, who was gay, is perhaps best known for his collaboration within The Violet Quill. He later went on to become senior editor of Ballantine Books. He appeared in William Shakespeare's Two Gentlemen of Verona, and later directed several plays at the Jean Cocteau Theater, New York City.

He died of an AIDS-related infection in 1990. His partner, William Olander, had died of the same disease in 1989.

== Works ==
- A Key West Companion, 1983
- Aunt Persian and the Jesus Man, assembled and edited by David Bergman in 1994
