= Andy Quan =

Chinese-Canadian author (born 1969)

- Born: 7 July 1969 (age 57); Vancouver, British Columbia
- Occupation: Author

Andy Quan (born 7 July 1969) is a Canadian author who now lives in Sydney. In his writing, he frequently explores the ways in which sexual identity and cultural identity interact. Quan is openly gay.

Quan was born in Vancouver, British Columbia, Canada. In addition to his writing, Quan is a musician and community activist. He was the first ever full-time paid employee of ILGA and has worked as a policy writer and project manager on issues related to the global HIV epidemic. He now works as an editor and copywriter.

== Works ==
- Quan, Andy; Wong-Chu, Jim (1999), Swallowing Clouds: An Anthology of Chinese-Canadian Poetry, Arsenal Pulp Press, ISBN 1-55152-073-7 (with Jim Wong-Chu)
- Andy Quan. (2001), Calendar Boy, New Star Books, ISBN 0-921586-82-5 (short fiction collection)
- Andy Quan. (2001), Slant, Nightwood Editions, ISBN 0-88971-179-8 (poetry)
- Andy Quan. (2005), Six Positions: Sex Writing by Andy Quan, Green Candy Press, ISBN 1-931160-36-8 (erotica)
- Andy Quan. (2007), Bowling Pin Fire, Signature Editions, ISBN 978-1-897109-22-9 (poetry)
- Andy Quan. (2008), Corpus: An HIV Prevention Publication, Vol. 6, No. 1, AIDS Project Los Angeles, ISBN 978-1-897109-22-9 (journal)
