= Michael Grumley =

American writer

Michael Grumley (July 6, 1942 – April 28, 1988) was an American writer and artist.

Grumley was born in Bettendorf, Iowa. He attended the University of Denver, the City College of New York and the Iowa Writers' Workshop. Grumley received a B.S. Degree with a major in philosophy from the University of Wisconsin-Milwaukee in 1964.

Grumley was a founding member of The Violet Quill. His partner, another founding member of the Quill, was Robert Ferro. He wrote a regularly appearing column Uptown for the New York Native. Grumley and Ferro are buried together under the Ferro-Grumley memorial in Rockland Cemetery, Sparkill, New York.

Following their deaths, the Ferro-Grumley Foundation, which manages their estate, created and endowed the annual Ferro-Grumley Award for LGBT fiction in conjunction with Publishing Triangle.

== Cryptozoology ==
Grumley was interested in cryptozoology, he was the author of a book on Bigfoot, titled There are Giants in the Earth the book was first published in 1975 with a later edition appearing in 1976. In the book Grumley concluded that anthropoid giants once roamed the earth, and that today there are still isolated survivors which he claimed are living in tunnels and caves.

== Works and publications ==
- Atlantis : the autobiography of a search. Bell. 1970. ISBN 9780517117323.
- There are giants in the earth. Doubleday. 1974. ISBN 0-385-07583-9.
- Hard corps: studies in leather and sadomasochism. E P Dutton. 1977. ISBN 0-525-47457-9.
- After midnight: the world of the people who live and work at night. Scribner. 1978. ISBN 0-684-15310-6.
- Life drawing : a novel. Grove. 1991. ISBN 0-8021-1438-5.
