= New York Native =

Defunct gay newspaper published in New York City

- Cover of the June 1, 1987 issue, featuring an article by John Lauritsen on AZT
- Type: Bi-weekly gay newspaper
- Publisher: Charles Ortleb
- Editor: Charles Ortleb
- Founded: December 5, 1980
- Ceased publication: January 13, 1997
- Language: English
- Headquarters: New York City

The New York Native was a biweekly gay newspaper published by Charles Ortleb in New York City from December 1980 until January 13, 1997. It was the only gay paper in New York City during the early part of the AIDS epidemic, and pioneered reporting on AIDS when most others ignored it. The paper subsequently became known for attacking the scientific understanding of HIV as the cause of AIDS and endorsing HIV/AIDS denialism.

== First news story on AIDS ==
On May 18, 1981, the New York Native, then America's most influential gay newspaper, published the first newspaper report on the disease that became known as AIDS. Having heard of a very rare type of pneumonia that struck some gay men, Lawrence D. Mass, the paper's medical writer, called the Centers for Disease Control and Prevention (CDC) and was advised that the rumors of a "gay cancer" were unfounded. He then wrote a story headlined: "Disease Rumors Largely Unfounded." Mass wrote:

Last week there were rumors that an exotic new disease had hit the gay community in New York. Here are the facts. From the New York City Department of Health, Dr. Steve Phillips explained that the rumors are for the most part unfounded. Each year, approximately 12 to 24 cases of infection with a protozoa-like organism, Pneumocystis carinii, are reported in New York City area. The organism is not exotic; in fact, it's ubiquitous. But most of us have a natural or easily acquired immunity.

Next month, on June 5, 1981, the CDC published the world's first clinical report on what became AIDS in Morbidity and Mortality Weekly Report (MMWR). On that same date, the CDC report was picked up and reported by the Los Angeles Times as the first mainstream newspaper coverage of the new disease. The New York Times followed suit on July 3, 1981. Although the Native covered the story almost three weeks prior, the June 5th date is often used as the first report of AIDS.

== Larry Kramer article on AIDS ==
In 1983, Larry Kramer wrote a famous impassioned front page piece for the Native, entitled "1,112 and Counting", which was published on March 14, 1983. From a profile on Larry Kramer in the New Yorker, published in 2002: "... it was a five-thousand-word screed that accused nearly everyone connected with health care in America—officials at the Centers for Disease Control, in Atlanta, researchers at the National Institutes of Health, in Washington, doctors at Memorial Sloan-Kettering Cancer Center, in Manhattan, and local politicians (particularly Mayor Ed Koch)—of refusing to acknowledge the implications of the nascent AIDS epidemic."

In his piece, Kramer said: "If this article doesn't rouse you to anger, fury, rage and action, gay men may have no future on this Earth."

== AIDS Activist History ==
Between 2014 and 2018, 70 interviews with AIDS activists were conducted by the AIDS Activist History Project. The interviewees actively organized movements around Canada between the 1980s and 1990s. These interviews shared a variety of tales of resilience, loss, and struggle. An interview with Barry Deeprose reveals his first interactions with AIDS, how he only was able to access information from newspapers, specifically the New York Native, and how Public Health Canada neglected to discuss it. "Nevertheless, they had really strong and good stories. And there was nothing else! We could get nothing from Public Health; Health Canada didn't even know, they just weren't interested. It seems to me, and I'm not sure if Perrin Beatty was the Minister of Health at that point, but he couldn't even say the word "AIDS" or "gay."

== Controversy and demise ==
In a New York Times article on the demise of the New York Native, Charles Ortleb, the magazine's publisher and editor, said that he was shutting down due to financial problems, but he conceded that the paper failed largely due to its controversial AIDS coverage. After its initial and pioneering success in making the gay community aware of the AIDS crisis, the paper later became unpopular for promoting conspiracy theories about AIDS and its causes, including the claim that HIV did not cause AIDS. The gay activist group ACT UP boycotted the publication in the mid-1980s. While there was initially some support for the Native's criticism of the governmental and scientific response to the AIDS epidemic, it eroded as Ortleb and the paper endorsed increasingly unlikely alternatives to HIV as the cause of AIDS. The cultural critic and AIDS activist Douglas Crimp wrote in 1987 that "...rather than performing a political analysis of the ideology of science, Ortleb merely touts the crackpot theory of the week, championing whoever is the latest outcast from the world of academic and government research."^{, p. 101} The paper's circulation consequently fell from 20,000 in 1985 to 8,000 in 1996.

Another contributing factor is that New York City, with an LGBT community that was often fractious and bitterly divided along gender, age and racial lines, has a long history of being a graveyard for gay publications. Those that have come and gone include Gaysweek (which was sued out of existence in 1979 by Newsweek magazine for trademark infringement), the New York City News (1980–83) QW (1991–1992), OutWeek (1989–1991), the New York Blade (which was actually the New York edition of the Washington Blade) (1997–2009), and LGNY (now Gay City News, the city's only surviving LGBT newspaper, 1995–present).

All of these publications also had to compete with the Village Voice, a citywide weekly alternative newspaper that extensively covered the 1969 Stonewall Riots that are credited as the birth of the modern gay liberation movement, and had enjoyed a large LGBT readership ever since—although it had a reputation for having an anti-gay slant in the late 1950s and early 1960s prior to the Stonewall Riots. The Voice published an annual Gay Pride issue in June.

== See also ==
- LGBT culture in New York City
