= Robert Ferro =

American writer (1941–1988)

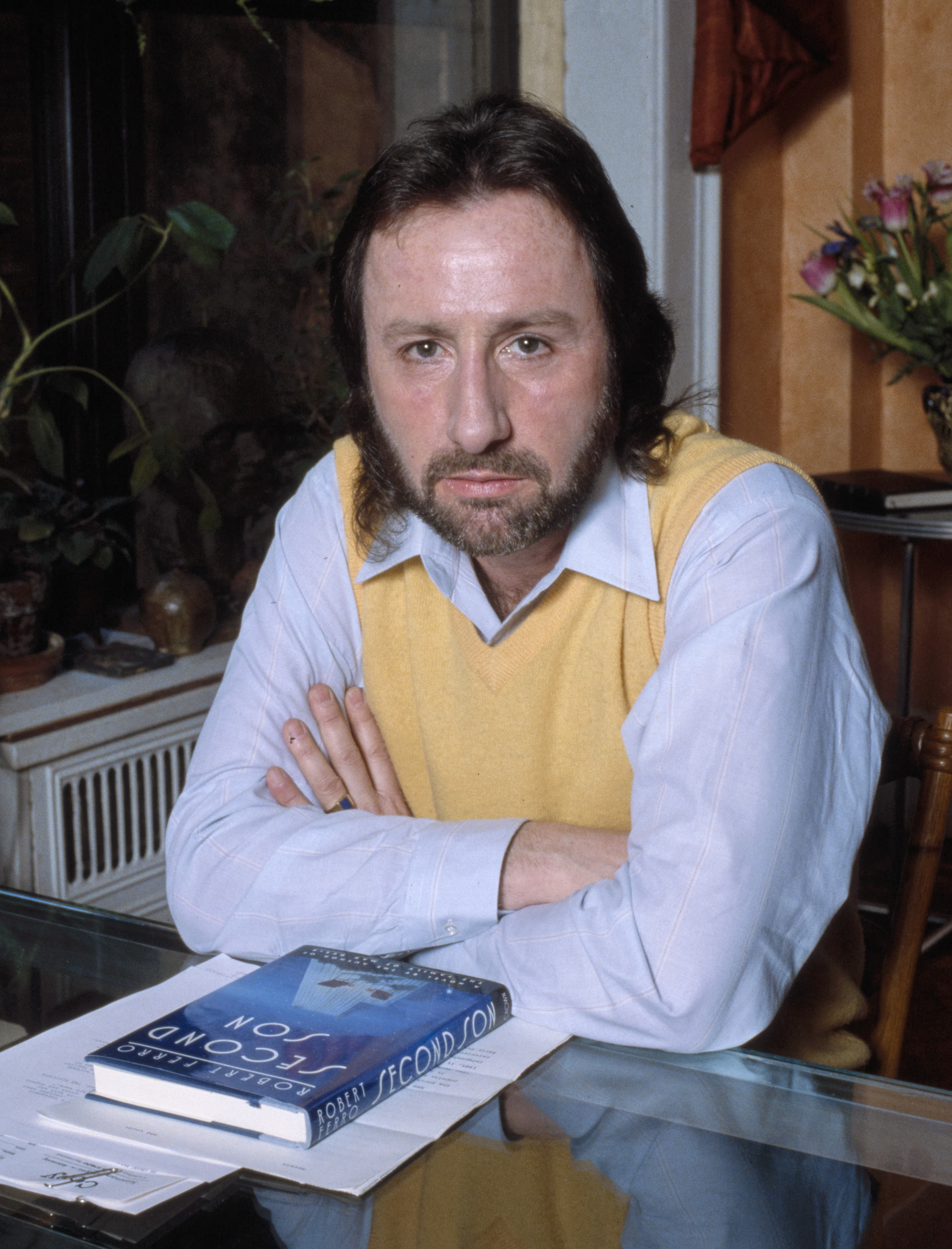
Ferro in 1988

Robert Ferro (October 21, 1941 – July 11, 1988) was an American novelist whose semi-autobiographical fiction explored the uneasy integration of homosexuality and traditional American upper middle class values.

== Biography ==
He was born in Cranford, New Jersey and graduated from Cranford High School. He went to college at Rutgers University and received a Master's Degree from the University of Iowa. In late 1965 Ferro met Andrew Holleran at the Iowa Writer's Workshop. He later lectured at Adelphi University. He was a member of The Violet Quill.

He died of AIDS a few months after his partner, Michael Grumley, in 1988 at his father's home in Ho-Ho-Kus, New Jersey, age 46. Grumley and Ferro are buried together under the Ferro-Grumley memorial in Rockland Cemetery, Sparkill, New York.

Following their deaths, the Ferro-Grumley Foundation, which manages their estate, created and endowed the annual Ferro-Grumley Award for LGBT fiction in conjunction with Publishing Triangle.

== Themes ==
Robert Ferro's works are especially interested in the phenomena of homosexual integration into the traditional family. Love of family is a theme that appears in both The Family of Max Desir, and Second Son and reflects his traditional Italo-American sentiments.

In 1984, Ferro told the "Cranford Chronicle" that the town in his novel The Family of Max Desir was a fictionalized version of his hometown, Cranford, New Jersey. The novel's "Indian River" is meant to be the Rahway River and acts as "the heart of the town and the center of [the main character's] imagination". "Indian Park", host to a revived Victorian water carnival in "Desir", is a fictionalized version of the real-life Nomahegan Park on the Rahway River.

== Books ==
- The Others. Scribner. 1977. ISBN 0-684-15137-5.
- The Family of Max Desir. Dutton. 1983. ISBN 0-525-24197-3.
- The Blue Star. Plume. 1985. ISBN 0-452-25819-7.
- Second Son. Crown. 1988. ISBN 0-517-56815-2.
