= Creative Nonfiction (magazine) =

American literary magazine

- Fall-Winter 2011 cover
- Editor: Lee Gutkind
- Categories: Literary magazine
- Frequency: Quarterly
- Founded: 1993
- First issue: 1994
- Final issue: 2023
- Company: Creative Nonfiction Foundation
- Country: United States
- Based in: Pittsburgh, Pennsylvania
- Language: English
- Website: creativenonfiction.org
- ISSN: 1070-0714

Creative Nonfiction is a literary magazine based in Pittsburgh, Pennsylvania, United States. The journal was founded by Lee Gutkind in 1993, making it the first literary magazine to publish, exclusively and on a regular basis, high quality nonfiction prose. In Spring 2010, Creative Nonfiction evolved from journal to magazine format with the addition of new sections such as writer profiles and essays on the craft of writing, as well as updates on developments in the literary nonfiction scene. As of 2023, the magazine has ceased publication, with no information provided about when or if they will resume publication. However, in a 2024 interview, Gutkind said, "Creative nonfiction is now one of the fastest-growing disciplines in both academia and publishing." After Creative Nonfiction went on an indefinite hiatus, a partnership between Creative Nonfiction and Narratively was announced.

Work originally printed in Creative Nonfiction has been reprinted in The Best American Essays, The Best American Travel Writing in 2013, The Best Women's Travel Writing in 2013, and The Best American Nonrequired Reading. In 2014, Creative Nonfiction ranked 23 on the Pushcart Prize list of nonfiction literary magazines. Creative Nonfiction was a finalist for the 2014 AWP Small Press Publisher Award and a finalist in the "Best Writing" category for the Utne Independent Press Award in 2011.

== Past issues ==
Number	Year	Title	Issue Description	Selected Contributing Authors
1	1994	Creative Nonfiction	The Premiere Issue - the one that started it all.	Christopher Buckley; Philip Garrison; Richard Goodman; Carolyn Kremers; Michael Pearson; Natalia Rachel Singer; Mimi Schwartz
2	1994	Poets Writing Prose	Poetry and creative nonfiction have a lot in common: deftness of word choice and the attention to detail, to name a few. In this issue, renowned and emerging poets cross forms to produce works of prose.	Christopher Buckley; Margaret Gibson; Richard Hague; Judith Kitchen; Donald Morrill; Adrienne Rich; Charles Simic
3	1995	Emerging Women Writers	This issue features work by emerging women writers whose powerful narratives promise to shape the future of the creative nonfiction genre.	Jane Bernstein; Diana Hume George; Kathryn Rhett; Jeanne Marie Laskas; Lauren Slater
4	1995	Creative Nonfiction Classics	This issue brings together classic essays (and a few new ones) that have helped charter the genre and develop it into what it is today.	Jonathan Holden; Lisa Knopp; John McPhee; Samuel F. Pickering; Louis Simpson; Gay Talese
5	1996	Fathers and Fatherhood	This collection gives special attention to the memory of fathers and the importance of their role in family life and the lives of the authors.	A. D. Coleman; Gordon Lish; Bret Lott; Phillip Lopate; Hilary Masters; Anne Morgan Gray; Linda Pastan; John T. Price; Moritz Thomsen; Pam Widener
6	1996	The Essayist at Work	This special issue gives the reader a chance to learn more about the craft and process of writing an essay through profiles and stories about the work of authors.	Jane Bernstein; Melinda Corey; Wendy Lesser; Michael Pearson; Natalia Rachel Singer; Alice Steinbach; Kathleen Veslany
7	1996	Points of View	This issue contains examples of the potential of the genre, serving as a model of the varied points of view achievable in writing creative nonfiction—from the distance of immersion/reportage to the personal closeness and intimacy of poetry.	Mark Bowden; David Gessner; David Hamilton; Maxine Kumin; Brenda Marie Osbey; Sherry Simpson; Charles Simic
8	1997	Mostly Memoir	Just as the title implies, this issue provides a short glimpse into the lives of the writers. The authors are sharing something special and true in this collection: their own stories.	Michael Berberich; Ellen Gilchrist; Elizabeth Hodges; Phillip Lopate; John McPhee; Kay E. Morgan; Donald Morrill; Kathryn Rhett; Alec Wilkinson
9	1997	Surviving Crisis	This special double issue highlights some of the most intimate, personal, and challenging moments of the authors' lives. Age, life, and disappointment are common themes throughout this collection.	Raymond Abbott; Jeff Gundy; Priscilla Hodgkins; Bill Roorbach
9.5	1998	The Universal Chord	The essays in this issue strike a universal chord by registering an insight, moment, or idea that might be shared and appreciated by a larger readership, making the readers care about what the writers care about: a place, a time of life, a friend, or a loved one.	Brian Doyle; Ntozake Shange; A. D. Coleman; Madison Smartt Bell; Michael Pearson
10	1998	Style and Substance	The essays in this issue are examples of how writers can blend style and substance while using a personal voice, demonstrating the true potential of creative nonfiction.	Madison Smartt Bell; Becky Bradway; Christopher Buckley; John D'Agata; Susan Fromberg Schaeffer; Mimi Schwartz; Connie Wieneke; Lucy Wilson Sherman; S.L. Wisenberg
11	1998	A View from the Divide	This special double issue demonstrates the many ways in which aspects of the scientific world can be captured and dramatized for a humanities-oriented readership. This collection of essays captures a range of ideas combining literary style and intellectual substance. These works come from poets, immunologists and physicists, established writers and up-and-coming new talent. (Special issue published by University of Pittsburgh Press.)	Luanne Armstrong; Gerald N. Callahan; Laura S. Distelheim; Susan L. Feldman; Philip Gerard; James Glanz; Mara Gorman; Alison Hawthorne Deming; Susan Mann; Scott Sandford; Carol Sandford
12	1999	Emerging Women Writers II	This follow-up issue again features work by emerging women writers who tell intricately detailed stories while being incisive, reflective, and deeply personal.	Valerie Boyd; Stephanie Byram; Norma V.L. Clarke; Ruth Deming; Beth Kephart; Caroline Nesbitt; Charlee Brodsky; Debra Anne Davis; Karen Rile; Leaf Seligman; Phyllis Raphael
13	1999	The Brain: A Nonfiction Mystery	This issue explores attempts to live normally with damaged brains and with brains affected by drugs. All the stories are tough illustrations of the complications that interfere with life when the brain is affected even slightly and subtly.	Greg Bottoms; Marilyn A. Gelman; James Glanz; Ronald Pies; Floyd Skloot
14	2000	What Men Think, What Men Write	What is worth noting about this narrative nonfiction is not so much what distinguishes the men writers from the women, but more what doesn't. The best of this work tells a story, defines character, provides (journalistic) information, allows for reflection, and establishes a personal voice.	Madison Smartt Bell; Orman Day; Charles Fanning; Peter LaSalle; Gregory Martin; Lee Martin; J. David Stevens; Robert Vivian; C.K. Williams
15	2000	Lessons in Persuasion: Writers with Pittsburgh Roots or Connections	Pittsburgh has always been—despite its industrial reputation—a great city in which to be a writer, and the featured authors are bound together by their affinity for the written word and their collective fondness for Pittsburgh. (Special issue published by University of Pittsburgh Press.)	Diane Ackerman; Peter S. Beagle; Jan Beatty; Keely Bowers; Malcolm Cash; Jack L. Daniel; Annie Dillard; Lester Goran; Chuck Kinder; Hilary Masters; Steward O'Nan; Natalie L.M. Petesch; Richard F. Peterson; Leslie Rubinkowski; Kathleen Veslany; Elissa Wald
16	2001	The Line Between Fact and Fiction	This issue explores the methods in which nonfiction writers utilize the fiction writer's toolbox without crossing the blurry divide between reality and imagination.	Joe Bonomo; Andrea Hollandy Budy; D. Mercer Bufter; Roy Peter Clark; David Goldblatt; Tzivia Glover; Debra Gwartney; Madeline G. Levine; Barbara Lounsberry; Czeslaw Milosz; Corinne Platt; Dov Siporin
17	2001	Between the Lines	This issue features essays that, among other things, take us between the lines of writers and readers in a variety of creative and informative contexts.	Stephen Benz; Andy Couturier; Brian Doyle; Daniel Hayes; Elena Passarello; Bret Lott; Molly Peacock; David Rompf; Michael Rosenwald
18	2001	Intimate Details	The essays published in this issue represent survival and change, expressed through dramatic stories and intimacy of detail.	Aine Greaney; Philip Gerard; Meredith Hall; Hal Herring; Jennifer Jeanne Patterson; Samuel Pickering; Ruthann Robson
19	2002	Diversity Dialogues	In this issue, celebrated and emerging authors write essays about diversity that defy easy labels. To seek out some new voices for this collection, Creative Nonfiction teamed up with JPMorganChase to offer a $10,000 prize for narratives about the challenges faced by outsiders in a world where "normal," "regular" and "accepted" are the watchwords and all others are marginalized.	Faith Adiele; Andrei Codrescu; Judyth Har-Even; Patricia Frisella; Shara McCallum; Francine Prose; Jewell Parker Rhodes; Richard Rodriguez; Floyd Skloot; John Edgar Wideman; Terry Tempest Williams
20	2003	Clarity	This issue features writers searching for clarity in their lives, and in the rest of the world, as they struggle to make social and personal changes and challenge their lives and their established communities.	Jane Bernstein; Laurie Graham; Meredith Hall; Joyce Reiser Kornblatt; Hilary Masters; Margaret Overton; Jana Richman; Lucinda Rosenfeld; Frank Soos
21	2003	Rage and Reconciliation: Inspiring a Health Care Revolution	This issue features writers, both patients and doctors, exploring the current state of American health care. (This issue received generous support from the Jewish Healthcare Foundation of Western Pennsylvania.)	Karen Wolk Feinstein; Beth Kephart; Nancy Linnon; Deborah McDonald; Natalie Smith Parra; Linda Peeno; Ruthann Robson
22	2004	Creative Nonfiction in the Crosshairs	This issue responds to the recent barrage of criticism from journalists and critics of the genre.	Laurie Lynn Drummond; Diana Hume George; Kate Krautkramer; Brenda Miller; Michael Pearson; Sallie Tisdale; Theodore Weesner
23	2004	Mexican Voices	This issue seeks to understand how nonfiction forms have evolved in regions outside of the United States–specifically, in Mexico. The essays offer the reader—through dramatic scenes, richly observed characters, and lively, philosophical meditations—more than just an understanding of the literary traditions of Mexico.	Diane Ackerman; Kathleen Alcalá; Homero Aridjis; Susan Briante; Rigoberto González; Hugo Hiriart; C.M. Mayo; Sergio Pitol; Sam Quinones; Alberto Ruy Sánchez; Ilan Stavans; Juan Villoro
24/25	2004	In Fact: The Best of Creative Nonfiction	This anthology features the best writing published in Creative Nonfiction over its first ten years. Culled from the 300 pieces published in the journal, themselves chosen from over 10,000 manuscripts, the stories now published in In Fact showcase the possibilities of the genre in pieces by the famous, and those surely destined to be so. Each author has also included a reflection on the process of composing the particular piece included. (Special issue published by W. W. Norton & Co. to celebrate CNF's 10 year anniversary.)	Diane Ackerman; Madison Smartt Bell; Mark Bowden; Gerald N. Callahan; Andrei Codrescu; Annie Dillard; Brian Doyle; Judyth Har-Even; Philip Gerard; Meredith Hall; Phillip Lopate; John McPhee; Francine Prose; Jewell Parker Rhodes; Jana Richman; Ruthann Robson; Richard Rodriguez; Leslie Rubinkowski; Ntozake Shange; Charles Simic; Floyd Skloot; Lauren Slater; John Edgar Wideman; Terry Tempest Williams
26	2005	The Poets and Writers Issue	This issue features many writers whose work crosses the borders between literary genres, from poetry and fiction to creative nonfiction, and illustrates how the lines of division between writers may be disintegrating. The stories themselves also flirt with the idea of crossing boundaries - between life and death, between countries and cultures and languages, and between individuals.	Ira Berkow; Toi Derricotte; Laurie Graham; Alle C. Hall; Hilary Masters; Hilda Raz; Lauren Slater
27	2005	Writing It Short	This issue features highlights from the online creative nonfiction journal Brevity^{1}, which challenges writers to do their best in fewer than 750 words.	Marcia Aldrich; Anjana Basu; Kelly Cherry; Brian Doyle; Matthew Gavin Frank; Philip Gerard; Natalie Goldberg; Robin Hemley; Lori Jakiela; Stuart Lishan; Sonja Livingston; Bret Lott; Debra Marquart; Lee Martin; Rebecca McClanahan; Patricia Ann McNair; Brenda Miller; Dinty W. Moore; Michael Perry; Susan Kushner Resnick; David Shields; Floyd Skloot; Maureen P. Stanton; Ira Sukrungruant; Alexis Wiggins
28	2006	Essays from the Edge	This issue features new voices exploring the darker side of life. The riveting and thought-provoking essays honestly grapple with a difficult time in each author's life.	Craig Bernier; D. Winston Brown; Adam Gussow; Meredith Hall; Gay Talese; Catherine Wald
29	2006	A Million Little Choices: The ABCs of CNF	This issue contains a glossary of concise entries that define and explain the anchoring elements of the genre, from scene and dialogue to acknowledging your sources. (This issue has been republished, in expanded form, as Keep It Real: Everything You Need to Know About Researching and Writing Creative Nonfiction.)	Kristen Cosby; Hattie Fletcher; Kristen Iversen; Lori Jakiela; Brenda Miller; Mimi Schwartz; Bryant Simon; Sarah Z. Wexler; Susan Yohe
30	2006	Our Roots are Deep with Passion: Creative Nonfiction Collects New Essays by Italian American Writers	Established and emerging writers reflect on the ways their lives have been accented with uniquely Italian American flavors. The pieces are as varied as their authors, but all explore the distinctive intersection of language, tradition, cuisine, and culture that characterize the diverse experience of Americans of Italian heritage.	Ned Balbo; Gina Barreca; Carol Bonomo Albright; Jeanna Lucci Canapari; Phyllis Capello; Mary Beth Caschetta; Rita Ciresi; Marianna de Marco Torgovnik; Louise DeSalvo; Edvige Giunta; Sandra M. Gilbert; Joanna Clapps Herman; Annie Lanzillotto; Maria Laurino; Joe Mantegna; Christine Palamidessi Moore; Peter Selgin; Stephanie Susnjara; Randy-Michael Testa; Laura Valeri; James Vescovi
31	2007	Imagining the Future: Writing and Publishing in 2025 and Beyond	This issue brings together voices from across the publishing spectrum—from novelists and journalists to librarians and editors—all of them speculating about the ways literature and the business of writing will change in the coming decades. The writers find common ground as they marvel at the way technology has ushered in a new era of communication.	Judith Barrington; Muharem Bazdulj; Ira Berkow; Dennis Covington; C. Michael Curtis; Marita Golden; Robin Hemley; Robert J. Hughes; Heidi Julavits; Phillip Lopate; Barbara Lounsberry; Immanuel Mifsud; Rebecca T. Miller; Dinty W. Moore; Donna Seaman; Denise Shekerjian; Gloriana St. Clair; David Henry Sterry; Amy Stolls; Astro Teller
32	2007	The Best Creative Nonfiction, Vol. 1	Creative Nonfiction scoured alternative publications, blogs, literary journals and other often-overlooked publications in search of new voices and innovative ideas for essays written with panache and power. (Special issue published by W. W. Norton.)	Dorie Bargmann; Eula Biss; Robin Black; Louise DeSalvo; Jeff Gordinier; Karl Taro Greenfeld; Dev Hathaway; Melissa Lafsky; Daniel Nester; Sunshine O'Donnell; Bonnie J. Rough; Michael Rosenwald; J.D. Schraffenberger; Heather Sellers; Rebecca Skloot; Lori Soderlind; Steve Dublanica; Alexis Wiggins
33	2007	Silence Kills: Speaking Out and Saving Lives	These essays present a compelling, and often frightening, look at the lack of communication and understanding currently plaguing the American health care system, exploring a wide and complicated range of experiences but all sharing one thing: a frustration with a system that hinders communication and often leads to unnecessary suffering.	Paul Austin; Karen Wold Feinstein; Diana Hume George; Meredith Hall; Merilee D. Karr; Sue William Silverman; Pamela Skjolsvik; Grace Talusan; Abraham Verghese
34	2008	Anatomy of Baseball	This collection of essays about the great American pastime dissects the game one element at a time to try to get at why we find ourselves in the stands or on the field, season after season.	Yogi Berra; Kevin Baker; Philip F. Deaver; Frank Deford; Jeff Greenfield; Caitlin Horrocks; Dinty W. Moore; Katherine A. Powers; J.D. Scrimgeour; Michael Shapiro; John Thorn; Sean Wilentz
35	2008	The Best Creative Nonfiction, Vol. 2	Creative Nonfiction again scoured alternative publications, blogs, literary journals and other often-overlooked publications in search of new voices and innovative ideas for essays written with panache and power. (Special issue published by W. W. Norton.)	Emily Bernard; David Bradley; Alice Bradley; Patricia Brieschke; Hauquan Chau; Sarah Miller-Davenport; William deBuys; Rob Dobrenski; Stefan Fatsis; Donovan Hohn; Heidi Julavits; Pagan Kennedy; Gwendolyn Knapp; Laura Sewell Matter; Ander Monson; Rolf Potts; James Renner; Susan M. Schultz; Vijay Seshadri; Phil Trinh
36	2009	First Lede, Real Lead	This issue offers readers a look at the editorial process and the challenge of deciding where a story really begins.	Paul Bogard; Maria Hummel; Howard Mansfield; Claire McQuerry; Anjali Sachdeva; Laurie Rachkus Uttich
37	2009	The Best Creative Nonfiction, Vol. 3	The essays, ranging from immersion journalism to intensely personal essays, illustrate the genre's power and potential. Special issue published by W. W. Norton, book format.	Julianna Baggott; Michael Copperman; Edwidge Danticat; Alice Domurat Dreger; John Griswold; Brenda Miller; Marie Motsuki Mockett; Gregory Orr; Emily Susan Rapp; Sean Rowe; Wesley Yang
38	2010	Essays: Immortality	The first issue in a new magazine style, no longer a journal format. Essays on the great (and not so great) moments of creative nonfiction; thoughts on the future of literary magazines; a guide to stunt writing; and more.	Carolyn Forché; Jeff Gordinier; Sarah Gorham; Lawrence M. Krauss; Stephen Kuusisto; Phillip Lopate; Todd May; Bill McKibben; Virginia Morell; Richard Rodriguez; David Shields; Rebecca Skloot
39	2010	Pioneers of the Genre	This issue pays tribute to pioneers of the genre such as Norman Mailer and Gay Talese.	Ayse Papatya Bucak; Rachael Button; Toi Derricotte; John Gilmore; Peter Ginna; Robin Hemley; Heidi Julavits; Doris Kearns Goodwin; Phillip Lopate; Greta Schuler
40	2010	The Animals Issue	Essays with a focus on animals, plus Phillip Lopate on the ethics of writing about other people and Sarah Z. Wexler on magazine editors' unwillingness to adopt to new technology.	Susan Cheever; Randy Fertel; Phillip Lopate; Jennifer Lunden; Jeff Oaks; Chester F. Phillips; Lauren Slater; Sarah Z. Wexler
41	2011	The Food Issue	Stories about food and our relationship to what we eat—from pork to lasagna, from pomegranates to toasted grasshoppers.	Robert Atwan; Victoria Blake; Sharon DeBartolo Carmack; John T. Edge; Matthew Gavin Frank; Dinah Lenney; Phillip Lopate; Christina Manweller; Liesl Schwabe; Rigel Stuhmiller
42	2011	Summer 2011	Winning essays from CNF and Salt's "The Night" contest, CNF's MFA Program-Off, and the Norman Mailer College Writing contest.	Ira Berkow; Casey Clabough; Seth Clark; S.J. Dunning; Phillip Lopate; Gabriel Scala; Lisa Schamess; Paul West (writer)
43	2012	Anger & Revenge	The meanest batch of essays CNF has ever published includes a post-divorce bonfire; post-traumatic stress; an assassination attempt; a kidnapping plot; Dick Cheney; and more.	Sonya Huber; Mardi Jo Link; Phillip Lopate; Michael Lotenero; Daniel Nester; Ned Stuckey-French; Inara Verzemnieks; Craig Strydom
44	2012	Spring 2012	A slew of true stories about navigating unfamiliar terrain: going out into Cairo in niqab; searching for a young man lost in the Grand Canyon; waiting for news about a possible nuclear accident in Ukraine; decoding an invitation in Vietnam; and committing (digital) atrocities in foreign lands.	Adam Arvidson; Jane Bernstein; B.J. Hollars; Collen Kinder; Travis Kurowski; Kirk Wisland
45	2012	True Crime	True stories of unsolved murders, grave-robbing, identity theft, abduction, addiction, and more.	Steven Church; Bob Coswer Jr.; Lacy M. Johnson; Shawna Kenney; Joyce Marcel; David McGlynn; Christopher Mohar; Harold Schechter; Donna Seaman; Stephanie Susnjara
46	2012	Australia	A special "Australia" issue that covers everything from "bikkies" to bora rings, floods to fires, and Captain Cook to Coober Pedy.	Robert Dessaix; Madelaine Dickie; Kirsten Fogg; Rachel Friedman; James Guida; Leah Kaminsky; Lee Kofman; Susan Bradley Smith; Robyn Williams; Stephen Wright
47	2012	Female Form	Features an all-women essay section with beautiful essays about serious topics—entomology, ophthalmology, archaeology, and molecular biology.	Elissa Bassist; Joe Bonomo; Angie Chuang; Sara Dailey; Chris Jones; Thomas Lake; Marissa Landrigan; Eric LeMay; Brenda Miller; Ben Montgomery; Elizabeth Mosier; Mary Quade; Cheryl Strayed; Matt Tullis
48	2013	Southern Sin	Deliciously degenerate stories about sinning in the South, from cheating at pee-wee football to the murderous jealousy of illicit lovers, the perils of shacking up, and the secret pleasures of arson. Plus: the intersection of literature and healing; tiny truths; a nonfiction sestina; and some stories we regret not being able to publish.	Sandra Beasley; Max Garland; Rachel Michelle Hanson; Sandi Hutcheson; Harrison Scott Key; Lynn Kilpatrick; Sonja Livingston; Jennifer Lunden; Chelsea Rathburn
49	2013	Survival Stories	An issue devoted to hair-raising stories of near misses. Writers reflect on narrow escapes from a plane crash, youthful recklessness, and trains barreling down on the station. The rest of the issue is a writer's survival guide, with notes on making dialogue work, a love letter to literary letters, the dangers of disclosure, and a visual guide to the personal essay.	Tim Bascom; Angie Chuang; Roxane Gay; Suzanne Hegland; Beth Kephart; Maia Morgan; Justin Moyer; Chris Offutt; Jon Reiner; Betsy Sharp; Genevieve Anna Tyrrell
50	2013	CNF Gold	This issue, celebrating 20 years of literary publishing, serves as an in-depth primer and introduction for anyone new to the magazine (or the genre), while providing longtime readers with new insight and never-before-told stories about the origins of Creative Nonfiction—and a peek into the future—from founding editor Lee Gutkind. The issue features 10 remarkable true stories from the first 50 issues, with introductions from CNF editors past and present.	Ayşe Papatya Bucak; Michael Rosenwald; Mary Paumier Jones; Elena Passarello; Sam Quiñones; Ruthann Robson; Liesl Schwabe; Charles Simic; Lauren Slater
51	2014	The Human Face of Sustainability	This issue features true stories about moms, scientists, farmers, and others who are trying to change the world.	Mieke Eerkens; Matthew Ferrence; Sarah Gilbert; Amy Hassinger; Michelle Lanzoni; Mary Heather Noble; Wendy Rawlings; Donna Seaman; Ana Maria Spagna; Nicole Walker
52	2014	Telling Stories that Matter	This issue explores the uses of storytelling in non-literary fields such as law and medicine. A special essays sections features collaborations between writers and science policy scholars telling stories about topics including a curatorial crisis at the Smithsonian; a pediatric geneticist's decision to share potentially life-changing information with one of his patients; and one legislative aide's quest to save the Chesapeake Bay from the dietary supplement industry.	Sayantani DasGupta; Joon-Hu Yu & Maria Delaney; David Schleifer & Alison Fairbrother; Niki Vermeulen & Molly Bain; Leslie Jill Patterson; Jill Sisson Quinn & Ramya Rajagopalan; Dan Sarewitz; Graham Shelby; Alyssa Grace Soresso; Allison Marsh & Lizzie Wade
53	2014	Mistakes	The first-ever readers' choice theme issue contains an explosive group of essays exploring wrong turns and missteps—from a dramatic prison protest to an ill-advised game of strip-spin-the-bottle, from a bad tattoo to the epidemic of errors plaguing our healthcare system. The stories grapple with questions that get at the heart of how to live. The issue also contains columns on why building a platform is a waste of a writer's time, why publishing won't make you happy, and why readers shouldn't worry (too much) about the occasional typo.	Stephanie Bane; Karen Donley-Hayes; Catherine Musemeche; Patricia A. Nugent; Joe Oestreich; Arthur Plotnik; Suzanne Roberts; Carol Fisher Saller; Scott Loring Sanders; Ennis Smith
54	2015	Lost Truths & Family Legends	This issue is full family lore—the stories we grew up hearing and the tales we, in turn, tell: Like the night we hit the deer, or Dad's close encounter with a serial killer, or the time Grandma saved the village from the Germans. Every family has at least one story like this—but is it true? (And, if it's a good enough story, does it matter whether it's true?) Plus, authors explore the special challenges of writing about family, and writers travel in search of missing stories.	Brian Doyle (writer); R. Reese Fuller; Jessica Handler; Michelle Herman; Jacqueline Kirkpatrick; Marissa Landrigan; Maggie Mertens; Maggie Messitt; Sejal H. Patel; Shelley Puhak
55	2015	The Memoir Issue	The spring 2015 edition is a special double issue with twice as many stories as usual, from places as far-ranging as Japan, Australia, the Marshall Islands, the Appalachian Trail, and Vermont. Essays illustrate thorny issues such as the power (and fallibility) of memory; the challenges of telling other people's stories accurately; and the art of self-analysis and reflection. Issue 55 also features columns on how social media might be changing human memory; readers’ duty to wield belief responsibly; and accepting the narcissist within.	Robert Atwan; Emily Bernard; Harrison Scott Key; D.T. Nguyen; Rolf Potts; Suzanne Roberts; Scott Loring Sanders; Mimi Schwartz; Sarah Smarsh; Kelly Fig Smith; Ron Tanner
56	2015	Waiting	Writers explore the boundaries of their patience as they wait for a missing family member's return, for sleep to come, for doctors, planes, or the next good wave. Plus, authors consider the murky origins of the term "creative nonfiction," the art of immersion reporting, and books that took lifetimes to write.	Mylène Dressler; Joe Fassler; Bridey Heing; Sangamithra Iyer; Judith Kitchen; Maggie Messitt; Dinty W. Moore; Sue William Silverman; Janine Zeitlin
57	2015	Making a Living	A collection of essays where writers reflect on their past occupations and the noteworthy jobs of others. Also considered is the price of writing, the financial security of the writer and the work of American historian Studs Terkel.	Ned Stuckey-French; Jennifer Niesslein; Karen Gentry; Anne Brannen; Kevin Haworth; Kristina Marusic; Heather Alexander; Nicole R. Zimmerman; Beth Tillman; Samm Deighan
58	2016	The Weather	Writers recount battling forces larger than themselves, whether enveloped in fog, stranded in a blizzard, or steering through a sea squall. The issue also features an interview with Al Roker about the challenges of writing creative nonfiction; journalist Andrew C. Revkin's reflection on 30 years of covering climate change; and a discussion of how technology is changing memoirists’ work.	* Joe Fassler: Andrew C. Revkin; Sonya Huber; Ashley Hay; Amaris Ketcham; Laura Jones; Glenda Reed; Lexi Pandell; Tim Bascom; Beatrice Lazarus; Sejal H. Patel; Anita Huslin; Diane Seuss
59	2016	Marriage	The issue surveys the contemporary landscape of matrimony, as writers recall walking down the aisle for the first or third or fifth time; vow never to wed again, except in the role of officiant; dissect the first year of marriage; brave city hall; and contemplate what it means to bind yourself, for better or for worse, to another person. Additionally, an author profiles New York Times obituary writer Margalit Fox; one writer examines why divorce memoirs are flourishing; and the editors assemble a collection of micro-essays, in the form of tweets, from a single Twitter user.	* Jane Bernstein: Amanda J. Crawford; Maribeth Fischer; Patrice Gopo; Shahnaz Habib; Kathleen McKitty Harris; Elane Johnson; Jane Maher; Matthew G. Miller; Randon Billings Noble; Jeff Oaks; Candace Opper; Heather Osterman-Davis; Melissa Shepherd; Vivian Wagner; Kim Wyatt
60	2016	Childhood	The issue formative childhood experiences that leave indelible memories: stomping through a snowstorm to Sunday mass; discovering a dead body in the woods; touring beautiful homes they'll never live in; or trying, desperately, to dance their way to junior high popularity. Here we have kid-dom in all its messy glory: the good, the bad, and the biting truth. Additionally, fifteen contemporary nonfiction authors discuss the books that made them writers; how to write about your kids without messing them up (too much); the link between addiction memoirs and coming-of-age stories; Tiny Truths; and more.	* Carrie Barker: Judith Barrington; Randon Billings Noble; Brian Broome; Kyla Buckingham; Brendan M. Collins; ° Kristi Murray Costello: Beth Ann Fennelly; Sara Hendery; Brenda Miller; Joe Oestreich; Kenneth R. Rosen; Marcelle Soviero; Julie Marie Wade; Lee Gutkind
61	2016	Learning from Nature	In this issue, we seek inspiration from the natural world—captured in powerful informative true stories. Deer antlers help surgeons build better prostheses, and scientists studying hibernation in arctic ground squirrels find a possible key to understanding Alzheimer's disease. Biomimicry visionary Janine Benyus fights to restore natural balance on a parcel of land in Montana, and in Oregon, naturalists grapple with the ethics of killing one species of owl to protect another owl's habitat.	* Wendy Bone: Suzanne Cope; Jonita Davis; Evan Edwards; Adelheid Fischer; Debra Gwartney; Dave Madden; Catherine Musemeche; Mary Heather Noble; Yelizaveta Renfro; Therese d'Auria Ryley; Jim Schneider; Vivian Wagner
62	2016	Joy	This issue captures elusive, unexpected moments of joy. Whether trying to make the most of an audience with the Dalai Lama, worrying about an eighth-grade Dinner Dance, or straining to see the stars in the night sky, contributors find themselves transported beyond distractions, discomforts, and disasters. We also explore the joys of the writing life, from the feel of the perfect pen to the satisfactions of changing readers’ minds.	* Melanie Brooks: Susan Bruns Rowe; Toi Derricotte; Brian Doyle; Lee Gutkind; Laura Haugen; Leah Kaminsky; Kim Kankiewicz; Laura Kendall; Alicia Rebecca Myers; Jennifer Niesslein; Brendan O'Meara; Angela Palm; Jennifer Sinor
63	2016	How We Teach	This issue reaches far beyond the traditional classroom. Contributors travel to the kitchen, to rehab centers, to the dentist's office, and as far as Saudi Arabia in these stories about making a meaningful impact. Not all stories about teaching are unqualified success stories, but they all show us how much teaching anything depends on making a connection, or at least trying to.	* Meredith Crandell: Margaret Downey; Jessica Lahey; David MacWilliams; Matthew Mercier; Ellen Michaelson; Joanne B. Mulcahy; Nikki Schulak; Sheryl St. Germain; Rachel Toliver; Deb Werrlein; Cecilia Woloch
64	2017	Adaptation	This issue sees writers searching for new normals. It seems, lately, we are living in a time of rapid change. Perhaps, it is the scale of the changes we are facing that is new, or maybe it's the speed at which information travels has made us more aware of change as it happens. From the eroding shores of Georgia's barrier islands to the national parks of Alaska to the suburbs sprawling into the Arizona desert, we try to keep up - personally, politically, scientifically - with our rapidly changing world.	* Elizabeth Bobrick: Renée E. D'Aoust; Beth Ann Fennelly; Gabriella M. Geisinger; Lawrence Lenhart; Nancy McGlasson; Sarah Minor; Itzel Basualdo Murillo; Amanda C. Niehaus; V. Alexandra Lytton Regalado; Elizabeth Rush; Rick Van Noy; Jodie Vinson; Hope Wabuke; Nicole Walker
65	2017	Science & Religion	This issue is dedicated to discovering unexplored harmonies between science and religion. Whether considering the spiritual potential of Google search, talking to high school biology teachers in central Pennsylvania, studying the Mormon cosmos, or forging a career path that passes through both the seminary and the science lab, the writers in this issue seek a nuanced view of the world that demands both wisdom and wonder. We hope the work in this issue will expand awareness and appreciation of the vital roles of both science and religion - no matter where or how or whether you worship and what you believe or don't believe.	* Cynthia D. Bertelsen: Jonathan Callard; Sherrie Flick; Jessica Mesman Griffith; Lee Gutkind; Dan Sarewitz; Kristin Johnson; Sonja Livingston; Rachel Mabe; Bethany Marcel; Dinty W. Moore; Sylvia Sukop; William Wan; Rachel Wilkinson; Jamie Zvirzdin
66	2018	Dangerous Creations	This issue is devoted to real-life Frankenstein stories about the intersections of technological innovation and the human condition. Writers consider prenatal surgeries, lifesaving medical interventions, and the limitations of science and medicine, wondering what it means, in the modern era, to be a monster.	* Jenny Boully: Kelly Hedglin Bowen; Pat Falk; Elizabeth Fortescue; Lee Gutkind; Jennifer R. Hubbard; Paulette Kamenecka; Karin Killian; Laura Laing; Randon Billings Noble; Susan Bruns Rowe; Heather Sellers; Margaret Wardlaw; Jamie Zvirzdin
67	2018	Starting Over	This issue is dedicated to the proposition that we are all—always—works in progress. In nine new essays, writers come to terms with fate, test the limits of resilience, flirt with disaster, fall down, and get back up again ... like it or not.	* Jill Christman: Christopher Collins; Kimberly Garza; Lee Gutkind; Geoffrey Melada; Heidi McKinley; Philip Metres; Emily Polk; Wendy Rawlings; Stacie Lewton Rice; Suzanne Roberts; Amy Schroeder; Victoria Sottosanti
68	2018	Risk	This issue explores how we balance the threat of loss against the promise of gain. Writers recall the thrill and terror of going off the high-dive and skiing alone in avalanche country (which one really shouldn't do). They impulsively invite famous chefs over for dinner, set off on poorly planned road trips, and weigh the advantages of medicating their children.	* Tanushree Baidya: Kelly Beard; Anne P. Beatty; Jonathan Escoffery; Lee Gutkind; dee Hobsbawn-Smith; Jenine Holmes; Sarah Kasbeer; Jennifer De Leon; Brenda Miller; Jennifer Niesslein; Jenny O'Connell; Shannon Reed; Jenn Scheck-Kahn; Jefferson Slagle; Ira Sukrungruang; Julie Marie Wade; Allison K Williams; Susannah Williams
69	2019	Intoxication	In this issue, writers explore the heady thrills—and, sometimes, dangers—of mother-daughter day-drinking; the Nashville music scene of 1983; finding a new romance in midlife; and surrendering to the Holy Spirit.	* Kira Compton: Sarah Curtis; Lee Gutkind; Maureen Hirthler; Sonya Huber; Joe Fassler; Kateri Kosek; Beth Kracklauer; Suzanne LaFetra Collier; Sheila Regan; Jennifer Jordán Schaller; Sarah Shotland; Rachel Sircy
70	2019	Home	In this issue, we search for our place in the world. From Ohio to Oregon, from Browning, Montana, to the US-Mexico border, and from gated communities and “safe” suburbs to tight-knit urban neighborhoods, eleven restless writers ask whether home is a place or a state of mind; who belongs and who doesn't; and why we stay and why we leave.	* Jane Alison: Mallory Barnes; Caitlin Dwyer; Lee Gutkind; Herb Harris; Rebecca Lanning; Susan V. Meyers; Sondra Olson; Shelley Puhak; James Riach; Brenda van Dyck; Emily Waples; Brian Phillip Whalen; Emily Wortman-Wunder
71	2019	Let's Talk About Sex	In this issue, writers invite us to share some of their most intimate moments—first times, last times, and everything in between. By turns joyous, hopeful, playful, wistful, and sometimes even uncomfortable, the stories in this issue expand our understanding of how—and why—people (and houseflies and sea urchins) “do it.”	* Steph Auteri: Amy Botula; Lee Gutkind; Sue Fagalde Lick; Julia Koets; M.G. Leibowitz; Joe Moran; B. Pietras; Suzanne Roberts; Anne Royan; Roger Tolle; Natalie van Hoose; Anne Visser Ney; Nicola Waldron
72	2019	Games	In this issue, writers connect with friends, family, and strangers to play Hanabi and hide-and-seek, mah-jongg and make-believe. Online or in-person, they explore other worlds, try on new ways of being, and find unexpected meaning.	* Sasha Barab: Yvette Benavides; Sarah Einstein; Alan Gershenfeld; Linda Stallman Gibson; Lee Gutkind; Veronica Kavass; Nicole Graev Lipson; Geoff Martin; Gabe Montesanti; Eben Pindyck; Renee Aukeman Prymus; Sarah Rosenthal; Sheryl St. Germain; Amber Wong
73	2020	Memoir	This issue celebrates stories of the self in the world. Writers find (or, at least, try to find) meaning in familiar as well as unimaginable moments—the loves, losses, and joys that define our lives.	* Rachel Beanland: Will Bridges; Jill Deasy; Megan Doney; Mary Beth Ellis; Lee Gutkind; Beth Kephart; Abby Mims; Anna Monardo; Gabe Montesanti; Will Storr; Jerald Walker
74	2021	Moments of Clarity	This issue features stories of sudden realizations, things that can't be unsaid, and power dynamics laid bare: a seventeen-year-old flirts her way into trouble; a daughter's offhand remark shatters a family's fragile peace; an employee quietly decides HR's focus on diversity is actually kind of racist, and more.	* Randon Billings Noble: Mackenzie Branson; Catherine Elcik; Eileen Garvin; Lee Gutkind; Caitlin Horrocks; Liz Iversen; Aurelia Kessler; Melissa Lujan Mesku; Susan McCarty; Eric L. Muller; Jane Ratcliffe; Baņuta Rubess
75	2021	Celebrating a Milestone	This milestone issue features some of our favorite prize-winning essays, by contributors including Brian Doyle, Judith Kitchen, Joe Fassler, Sonya Huber, and Emily Bernard. These curious, beautiful, nuanced stories about everything from surviving lightning strikes to the relief of solving medical mysteries consider the many perils as well as the tremendous power of living in a body.	* Judith Barrington: Elissa Bassist; Emily Bernard; Brian Doyle; Joe Fassler; Amaris Feland Ketcham; Jeff Gordinier; Lee Gutkind; Sonya Huber; Judith Kitchen; Heidi McKinley; Suzanne Roberts; B. Pietras; Dan Sarewitz; Donna Seaman; Cheryl Strayed; Genevieve Anna Tyrrell; Margaret Wardlaw
76	2022	Exploring an Expanding Genre	In this, the newly redesigned issue of Creative Nonfiction, we explore the deep roots of the genre, as far back as the late 1600s, and celebrate the spirit of rebellion that's always infused it. And we consider where we are now—as writers and citizens, as artists and human beings—at this moment that feels pivotal for so many.	* Marion Agnew: Valerie Boyd; Anika Fajardo; Chris Galvin; Laurie Granieri; Lee Gutkind; Jane Hammons; Holly Haworth; Jennifer R. Hubbard; Margaret Kimball; Connie Kuhns; Bronson Lemer; Bret Lott; Marisa L. Manuel; Brenda Miller; Clinton Crockett Peters; Kelly Plante; William Reagan; Molly Sepkoski St. Clair; Sejal Shah; Margrét Ann Thors; Karen Zey
77	2022	Resilience	In this issue, we consider the challenges of living through collective (and too often unacknowledged) grief. How do we keep going in a time of tremendous sorrow? How do we put our experiences to good use? And how do we make room for joy and hope and laughter?	* Amye Archer: A. J. Bermudez; Francis Doherty; Lee Gutkind; Caroline Hagood; Clare Magneson; Anne McGrath; Joe Primo; Laura Pritchett; Meg Senuta; Amber Taliancich
78	2022	Experiments in Voice	This issue is a celebration of writerly playfulness, exploration, and risk-taking, featuring breathless, epistolary, speculative, second-person, and snarky essays.	* Nikki Campo: Jill Christman; Samantha Edmonds; Lee Gutkind; Sonya Huber; Annette Januzzi Wick; Gary A. Kadlec; Kristin Keane; Beth Kephart; Victor Letonoff; Yi Shun Lai; Mary O'Connell; Sean Prentiss; Leath Tonino

== Past contributors ==
- Diane Ackerman
- Jane Alison
- Roger Angell
- Jane Bernstein
- Frank Deford
- Annie Dillard
- Andre Dubus
- Stefan Fatsis
- Beth Ann Fennelly
- Carolyn Forché
- Ellen Gilchrist
- Meredith Hall
- Sonya Huber
- Heidi Julavits
- Shawna Kenney
- Lawrence Krauss
- Erik Larson (author)
- Gordon Lish
- Phillip Lopate
- Bret Lott
- Hilary Masters
- Todd May
- Bill McKibben
- John McPhee
- Philip Metres
- Dinty W. Moore
- Daniel Nester
- Stewart O'Nan
- Chris Offutt
- Linda Peeno
- George Plimpton
- Francine Prose
- Adrienne Rich
- Ruthann Robson
- Elizabeth Rush
- Richard Rodriguez
- Heather Sellers
- David Shields
- Charles Simic
- Floyd Skloot
- Rebecca Skloot
- Lauren Slater
- Gay Talese
- John Edgar Wideman
- C.K. Williams
- Terry Tempest Williams

== CNF books ==
Title	Description	Publisher	Year	ISBN
What I Didn't Know: True Stories of Becoming a Teacher	A collection of twenty personal narratives from teachers and their fascinating insight on the profession.	In Fact Books	2016	ISBN 978-1-937163-27-3
Show Me All Your Scars: True Stories of Living with Mental Illness	A collection of twenty essays about living with mental illness. With an introduction by Patrick J. Kennedy. Foreword by Karen Wolk Feinstein, PhD	In Fact Books	2016	ISBN 978-1-937163-25-9
Oh, Baby!: True Stories About Conception, Adoption Pregnancy, Labor, and Love	A collection of twenty-three essays about becoming a parent. Co-edited by Alice Bradley with an introduction by Lisa Belkin.	In Fact Books	2015	ISBN 978-1-937163-21-1
Same Time Next Week: True Stories of Working Through Mental Illness	A collection of eighteen essays that reflect the writers' struggles to overcome the challenges of mental disorders. With an introduction by Peter D. Kramer and a foreword by Karen Wolk Feinstein.	In Fact Books	2015	ISBN 978-1-937163-10-5
True Stories, Well Told: From the First 20 Years of Creative Nonfiction Magazine	A collection of twenty gripping nonfiction narratives, the best of the best from CNF. Co-edited by Hattie Fletcher with an introduction by Susan Orlean.	In Fact Books	2014	ISBN 978-1-937163-16-7
Southern Sin: True Stories of the Sultry South & Women Behaving Badly	Personal, poetic and journalistic stories contributed by Southern women. Co-edited by Beth Ann Fennelly with an introduction by Dorothy Allison	In Fact Books	2013	ISBN 978-1-937163-10-5
True Crime: Real-life Stories of Grave-robbing, Identity Theft, Abduction, Addiction, Obsession, Murder, and More	Real-life crime stories including an investigation into the attempted assassination of Gabby Giffords.	In Fact Books	2013	ISBN 1937163148
I Wasn't Strong Like This When I Started Out: True Stories of Becoming a Nurse	A collection of true narratives by nurses in different stages of their careers. With a foreword by Karen Wolk Feinstein.	In Fact Books	2013	ISBN 978-0-393-07156-6
You Can't Make This Stuff Up: The Complete Guide to Writing Creative Nonfiction—from Memoir to Literary Journalism and Everything in Between	A genre how-to guide from Lee Gutkind, the founder and editor of Creative Nonfiction.	Da Capo Press	2012	ISBN 978-0-7382-1554-9
An Immense New Power to Heal: The Promise of Personalized Medicine	Stories and profiles on the sequencing of the human genome and the subsequent development of personalized medicine. Co-edited by Pagan Kennedy.	In Fact Books	2012	ISBN 978-1-937163-06-8
At the End of Life: True Stories About How We Die	Twenty-two personal-medical narratives exploring death, dying and palliative care. With an introduction by Francine Prose.	In Fact Books	2012	ISBN 978-1-937163-04-4
Becoming a Doctor: From Student to Specialist, Doctor-Writers Share Their Experiences	Original stories about the daily lives of doctors.	W.W. Norton	2010	ISBN 978-0-393-07156-6
The Best Creative Nonfiction, Vol. 3	A collection of true stories—ranging from immersion journalism to personal essays—selected by Lee Gutkind and the staff of Creative Nonfiction.	W.W. Norton	2009	ISBN 978-0-393-33025-0
The Best Creative Nonfiction, Vol. 2	A special issue of Creative Nonfiction that features twenty-seven essays that originally appeared in alternative publications, blogs, literary journals, and other publications.	W.W. Norton	2008	ISBN 978-0-393-33024-3
Anatomy of Baseball	Twenty new and classic essays about the American past time. Co-edited by Andrew Blauner with a foreword by Yogi Berra.	SMU Press	2008	ISBN 978-0-87074-522-5
Keep It Real: Everything You Need to Know About Researching and Writing Creative Nonfiction	Provides writers with the working parameters of the creative nonfiction genre.	W.W. Norton	2008	ISBN 978-0-393-06561-9
Silence Kills: Speaking Out and Saving Lives	Twelve new essays written by physicians, patients, and family members. Explores the communication breakdown in the current American health care system.	SMU Press	2007	ISBN 978-0-87074-518-8
The Best Creative Nonfiction, Vol. 1	A special issue of Creative Nonfiction that features twenty-seven essays that originally appeared in alternative publications, blogs, literary journals, and other publications.	W.W. Norton	2007	ISBN 978-0-393-33003-8
Hurricanes and Carnivals: Essays by Chicanos, Pochos, Pachucos, Mexicanos, and Expatriates	Originally published as Issue 23 of Creative Nonfiction, this book features fifteen essays that push the boundaries between fact and fiction. With an introduction by Ilan Stavans.	The University of Arizona Press	2007	ISBN 978-0-8165-2625-3
Our Roots are Deep with Passion: Creative Nonfiction Collects New Essays by Italian American Writers	Twenty-one essays written by established and emerging writers that explore the unique intersections of language, tradition, cuisine, and culture that characterize the diverse experience of Americans of Italian heritage. Co-edited by Joanna Clapps Herman with a foreword by Joe Mantegna.	Other Press	2006	ISBN 978-1-59051-242-5
Rage & Reconciliation: Inspiring a Health Care Revolution	Originally published as issue 21 of Creative Nonfiction, the book includes new essays and an 80-minute CD containing three essays read by professional actors and a panel discussion of the ethical dimensions of the issues raised. Produced in conjunction with Pittsburgh's Jewish Healthcare Foundation, writers tackle health care in America, including problems of patient rights and professional responsibility.	SMU Press	2005	ISBN 0-87074-503-4
In Fact: The Best of Creative Nonfiction	Twenty-five essays, all originally appearing in Creative Nonfiction, republished in honor of the journal's tenth anniversary.	W.W. Norton	2005	ISBN 0-393-32665-9
Lessons in Persuasion: Creative Nonfiction/Pittsburgh Connections	Eighteen essays written by writers with ties to the city of Pittsburgh.	University of Pittsburgh Press	2000	ISBN 0-8229-5715-9
A View from the Divide: Creative Nonfiction on Health and Science	Seventeen essays that attempt to demonstrate the many ways in which aspects of the scientific world—from biology, medicine, physics, and astronomy—can be captured and dramatized for a humanities-oriented readership.	University of Pittsburgh Press	1998	ISBN 978-0-8229-5685-3
The Art of Creative Nonfiction: Writing and Selling the Literature of Reality	Introduces the genre of creative non-fiction and the process of structuring, researching and writing creative non-fiction essay.	John Wiley & Sons, Inc.	1997	ISBN 0-471-11356-5

== The Creative Nonfiction Foundation ==
The Creative Nonfiction Foundation pursues educational and publishing initiatives in the genre of literary nonfiction. Its objectives are to provide a venue, the journal Creative Nonfiction, for high quality nonfiction prose (memoir, literary journalism, personal essay); to serve as the singular strongest voice of the genre, defining the ethics and parameters of the field; and to broaden the genre's impact in the literary arena by providing an array of educational services and publishing activities.

The Creative Nonfiction Foundation was incorporated in 1994 and is a private not-for-profit 501(c)(3) organization supported by public and private funds contributed by the Pennsylvania Council on the Arts, the Juliet Lea Hillman Simonds Foundation, the Vira I. Heinz Endowment, and the Jewish Healthcare Foundation, as well as by individual donors.

=== Educational programs ===
The Creative Nonfiction Foundation offers a number of educational programs for teachers, students, and emerging writers.

==== Mentoring programs ====
Creative Nonfiction's mentoring program pairs new writers with seasoned professionals such as Rebecca Skloot and Dinty W. Moore. The mentoring program's goal is to help new writers: 1) develop their technique and approach to creative nonfiction composition; 2) revise, edit and shape their manuscript; and 3) place their finished manuscript with a publisher.

==== Online courses ====
Creative Nonfiction provides online courses on basic techniques for research, interviewing, immersion, and reporting as well as instruction on writing personal essays.

==== Writers' conferences ====
CNF hosted the Mid-South Conference in Oxford, Mississippi, in February 2008, and 412: The Pittsburgh Creative Nonfiction Literary Festival in 2004, 2005, 2006, and 2008. In the spring of 2013, Creative Nonfiction hosted The Best of Creative Nonfiction Conference at the Pittsburgh Cultural Trust Arts Education Center in Pittsburgh, Pennsylvania. Creative Nonfiction also hosts an annual Creative Nonfiction Writers' Conference, dedicated to the art, craft, and power of true stories, each May.

==== Writing institutes ====
Creative Nonfiction holds institutes throughout the year in a variety of locations and offers programs for writers at all levels of experience. Instructors include Lee Gutkind and other well-known writers, teachers, and editors. The institutes often cover a range of themes, from the basics of the creative nonfiction genre to writing memoir to travel narrative. Courses also attempt to emphasize the ethics and guidelines of the genre.

== Editorial advisory board ==
A number of prominent authors, educators and media figures are members of the Foundation's Editorial Advisory Board, whose task is to help the editorial board sustain and guide the editorial mission of the magazine.

- Diane Ackerman
- Buzz Bissinger
- Edwidge Danticat
- Annie Dillard
- Dave Eggers
- Jonathan Franzen
- Tracy Kidder
- Rick Moody
- Susan Orlean
- Francine Prose
- Ruth Reichl
- Richard Rodriguez
- Rebecca Skloot
- Gay Talese

== See also ==
- Tinpahar
- Harper's Magazine
