= Jakieła =

Jakieła is a Polish surname. Notable people with the surname include:

- Joanna Jakieła (born 1999), Polish biathlon competitor
- Lori Jakiela (fl. from 2006), American author
