= Ciresi =

Ciresi is a surname. Notable people with the surname include:

- Joe Ciresi (born 1970), American politician
- Michael V. Ciresi (fl. 1971), American lawyer
- Rita Ciresi (born 1961), American short story writer and novelist of Italian descent
