= Laurie Graham =

Laurie Graham may refer to:

- Laurie Graham (skier), Canadian downhill skier who represented Canada at the 1980, 1984 and 1988 Winter Olympics
- Laurie Graham (novelist) (born 1947), journalist, scriptwriter and novelist
- Laurie Graham (politician) (born 1945), Australian politician
