= Steven Church =

American essayist and writer

- Born: December 27, 1971 (age 54); Lawrence, KS, United States
- Occupations: non-fiction writer, essayist, memoirist
- Writing career
- Genre: literary nonfiction

Steven Church (born 1971) is an American essayist and writer of memoir and literary nonfiction. Winner of the Glenna Luschei Prize from Prairie Schooner, Recipient of Colorado Book Award in Creative Nonfiction for The Guinness Book of Me: A Memoir of Record, "Auscultation" chosen by Edwidge Danticat for inclusion in the 2011 Best American Essays. Church is the author of The Guinness Book of Me: A Memoir of Record (2005), Theoretical Killings: Essays & Accidents (2009), The Day After The Day After: My Atomic Angst (2010),Ultrasonic: Essays.(2014), One with the Tiger: Sublime and Violent Encounters between Humans and Animals (2016)

== Life and work ==
Steven Church was born in Lawrence, Kansas, in 1971. He earned a Master of Fine Arts in fiction at Colorado State University in 2002. Church's essays have appeared in The Rumpus, Passages North, DIAGRAM, Brevity, River Teeth, AGNI, Creative Nonfiction, Terrain.org, Fourth Genre, Prairie Schooner, and Salon.com. He is the founding editor and nonfiction editor of The Normal School, a contributing editor to The Colorado Review, Hallowell Professor of Creative Writing at Fresno State, and a contributor to Longreads.com.

== Works ==
=== Non-fiction books ===
- The Guinness Book of Me: A Memoir of Record. Simon & Schuster. 2005
- Theoretical Killings: Essays & Accidents. University of New Orleans Press. 2009
- The Day After The Day After: My Atomic Angst. Soft Skull Press. 2010
- Ultrasonic. Lavender Ink. 2014
- One with the Tiger: Sublime and Violent Encounters between Humans and Animals. Soft Skull Press. 2016

=== Essays ===
- "The Tragic but Common History of Zoo Cage Jumpers". The Nervous Breakdown. 2016
- "Manimals in Captivity". The Nervous Breakdown. 2016
- "Werner Herzog is Our Witness". Electric Lit. 2016
- "The Ways in Which I'd Like to Get Attacked by a Bear". Literature Hub. 2016
- "Playing the Goon". Catapult. 2016
- "Uncomfortable Spaces; Or, Why Would You Write About That?" Powell's.com. 2016
- "Field Trip to the Earthquake Lab". The Rumpus. 2013
- "Tracking Quakes". The Rumpus. 2012
- "On Loitering". The Rumpus. 2013
- "Crown and Shoulder". Passages North. 2014
- "Seven Fathoms Down". DIAGRAM
- "Overpass Into Fog". Brevity. 2014
- "Lagtime". Brevity. 2010
- "Danger Boys". River Teeth. 2001
- "On Kids and Bombs (Or How to be a Hummingbird)". River Teeth. 2014
- "All of Dither". AGNI. 2010
- "Speaking of Ears and Savagery". Creative Nonfiction. 2012
- "Living through the Tremors". Terrain.org. 2014
- "Thoughts on the Apocalypse: Chasing Disaster". Terrain.org. 2014
- "Ultrasonic". Fourth Genre. 2010
- "Testing Ground: Notes on Writing Ultrasonic". Fourth Genre. 2010
- "On Lyric Essays and Dancing in Sequined Pants". Fourth Genre. 2012
- "Next Stop, Meteor Crater". Fourth Genre. 2003
- "I'm Just Getting to the Disturbing Part". Fourth Genre. 2007
- "Fight, Bull". Prairie Schooner. 2012
- "Mike Tyson's Ear Fixation, and Mine". Salon.com. 2013

=== Anthologized works ===
- Blurring the Boundaries: Explorations to the Fringes of Nonfiction. Ed. By B.J. Hollars. University of Nebraska Press. 2013
- True Crime. Ed. By Lee Gutkind. InFact Books.
- After Montaigne: Contemporary Essayists Cover The Essays. Ed. By Patrick Madden and David Lazar. University of Georgia Press. 2015
- Making Essays. Ed. By Jen Hirt and Erin Murphy. SUNY Press. 2015
- Oh, Baby!. Ed. By Lee Gutkind. InFact Books. 2015
- You. An Anthology of Essays Devoted to the Second Person. Ed. By Kim Dana Upperman, Heather G. Simons, and James M. Chesbro. Welcome Table Press. 2013

=== Other publications ===
- The Fourth Genre: Contemporary Writers of/on Creative Nonfiction. Longman. 2011

=== Additional information ===
- BA in Philosophy from the University of Kansas. 1995
- Currently resides in Fresno, California with his family
