= In Fact: The Best of Creative Nonfiction =

2005 book

- Editor: Lee Gutkind
- Genre: Essay collection
- Publisher: W. W. Norton
- Publication date: 2005

In Fact: The Best of Creative Nonfiction (2005, edited by Lee Gutkind) gathers the best essays published in Creative Nonfiction over its first ten years of publication to create a book – part writing manual, part prose anthology.

In Fact is 440 pages long and is published by W.W. Norton. The book was made possible by funding from the Creative Nonfiction Foundation.

== Selection process ==
In Fact offers the best twenty-five stories that were published in Creative Nonfiction's first ten years of existence. Culled from the 300 pieces published in the journal themselves chosen from over 10,000 manuscripts, the stories reprinted in In Fact showcase the possibilities of the emergent genre of creative nonfiction in pieces by already famous authors and those likely to become famous.

Each author has also included a reflection on the process of composing his or her particular piece included in this anthology. The reflective pieces form a core of valuable tips and advice for those hoping to find their own writing voice.

== Book contents ==
- "Introduction: Notes for Young Writers" - Annie Dillard
- "The Creative Nonfiction Police?" - Lee Gutkind
- "Three Spheres" - Lauren Slater
- "Looking at Emmit Till" - John Edgar Wideman
- "Shunned" - Meredith Hall
- "An Album Quilt" - John McPhee
- "Dinner at Uncle Boris's" - Charles Simic
- "Prayer Dogs" - Terry Tempest Williams
- "What Is It We Really Harvestin' Here?" - Ntozake Shange
- "The Brown Study" - Richard Rodriguez
- "Killing Wolves" - Sherry Simpson
- "Being Brians" - Brian Doyle
- "Language at Play" - Diane Ackerman
- "Finders Keepers: The Story of Joey Coyle" - Mark Bowden
- "Notes from a Difficult Case" - Ruthann Robson
- "Adventures in Celestial Navigation" - Philip Gerard
- "Leaving Babylon: A Walk Through the Jewish Divorce Ceremony" - Judyth Har-Even
- "Gray Area: Thinking with a Damaged Brain" - Floyd Skloot
- "Joe Stopped By" - Andrei Corescu
- "In the Woods" - Leslie Rubinkowski
- "Sa'm Pedi" - Madison Smartt Bell
- "Going Native" - Francine Prose
- "Chimera" - Gerald N. Callahan
- "Mixed-Blood Stew" - Jewell Parker Rhodes
- "Why I Ride" - Jana Richman
- "Delivering Lily" - Phillip Lopate
