= Jeff Gordinier =

American food writer

Jeff Gordinier is an American writer and editor whose work is frequently published in various U.S. magazines and newspapers, including Esquire and The New York Times. In addition, he is the author of two books of non-fiction, X Saves the World and Hungry: Eating, Road-tripping, and Risking It All with the Greatest Chef in the World, and co-editor of a book containing a collection of essays.

== Biography ==
Jeff Gordinier is a 1988 graduate of Princeton University, where he studied writing with noted authors like John McPhee, Russell Banks, and Joyce Carol Oates. In the summer of 1988 he interned at the Los Angeles Times. From 1989 to 1991, he was a city government and politics reporter for The News & Observer in Raleigh, North Carolina. In 1991, he lived as a writer in Prague following the Velvet Revolution.

Upon returning to the United States in 1992, he worked as a music critic and local columnist for the Santa Barbara News-Press in Santa Barbara, California. From 1994 to 2002, Gordinier was a writer and editor for Entertainment Weekly, covering music and movies, then held a position as editor-at-large for Details magazine until 2011. In 2008, he published his first book, X Saves the World.

From 2011 to 2016, Gordinier was a staff writer for the food section of The New York Times, as well as a frequent contributor to other sections of the paper such as The New York Times Book Review, The New York Times Magazine, and the style and travel sections.

In 2015, together with Marc Weingarten, he co-edited the book Here She Comes Now, a collection of essays about women in music.

Gordinier is the current food & drinks editor of Esquire magazine. He is also a frequent contributor to The New York Times.

Gordinier has written for Travel + Leisure, GQ, Elle, Creative Nonfiction, Spin, Poetry Foundation, Fortune, The Best American Nonrequired Reading, and more. His latest book, Hungry: Eating, Road-tripping, and Risking It All with the Greatest Chef in the World, was published in July 2019 under the Tim Duggan Books imprint of Penguin Random House.

== Personal ==
Gordinier was raised in Southern California and graduated from Princeton University. He lives north of New York City with his wife, Lauren Fonda, and his four children.
