= Damaged Care =

- Teleplay by: Ilene Chaiken
- Directed by: Harry Winer
- Starring: Laura Dern; James LeGros; Suki Kaiser; Michelle Clunie; Adam Arkin; Regina King; Diane Ladd
- Music by: Bruce Broughton
- Country of origin: United States
- Original language: English

Production
- Producers: Harry Winer; David Roessel; Laura Dern
- Running time: 115 minutes

Original release
- Network: Showtime
- Release: May 26, 2002

Damaged Care is an American television film which aired on May 26, 2002, on Showtime. The film is based on the story of the real-life Linda Peeno, a physician and medical reviewer for managed care organizations who becomes a vocal critic of the American healthcare system after witnessing the prioritization of profit over patient care.

== Plot ==
Dr. Linda Peeno begins her career as a medical reviewer at a Kentucky health maintenance organization (HMO). She receives an emergency call from a surgeon regarding a heart transplant, who let her know that a donor was found for a patient that is insured by the HMO she works for, and the patient is on the operating table, awaiting insurance approval. Dr. Peeno initially plans to approve the procedure, believing the patient has met the medical indications for a transplant. However, she receives pressure from her supervisor and insurance colleagues to deny coverage for the surgery, which she ultimately does. During a phone call to inform the surgeon about the denied coverage, the surgeon becomes emotional and accuses Peeno of being a "murderer" and having "just served a death sentence" to the patient. Her supervisor and colleagues reassure her that the decision aligns with company policy regarding resource allocation and congratulate her for saving the organization a significant amount of money.

As Dr. Peeno navigates the corporate environment of the HMO, she encounters executives who she feels prioritize financial considerations over patient care. After resigning from her first position, she accepts a role at another HMO that claims to prioritize patient welfare. However, she soon discovers that similar profit-driven motives persist. Financial pressures related to her family's situation, compounded by pressure from her husband, lead her to remain in this second position longer than she initially intended, despite her growing concerns about the organization's practices.

As the story progresses, Dr. Peeno's experiences lead her to become a vocal critic of the managed care system, ultimately collaborating with a lawyer who shares her concerns about ethical practices in healthcare.

== Cast and crew ==
- Laura Dern as Linda Peeno
- James LeGros as Doug Peeno
- Michelle Clunie as Gemma Coombs
- Adam Arkin as Paul Sheinberg
- Regina King as Cheryl Griffith
- Diane Ladd as Mary "Rhodie" Rhodes
- William B. Davis as Sam Verbush
- Suki Kaiser as Dawn Dubose
