= Dinty W. Moore =

Dinty W. Moore (born August 11, 1955) is an American essayist and writer of both fiction and non-fiction books. He received the Grub Street National Book Prize for Non-Fiction for his memoir, Between Panic and Desire, in 2008 and is also author of the memoir To Hell With It: Of Sin and Sex, Chicken Wings, and Dante’s Entirely Ridiculous, Needlessly Guilt-Inducing Inferno, the writing guides The Story Cure, Crafting the Personal Essay, and The Mindful Writer, and many other books and edited anthologies.

== Life and career ==
Dinty W. Moore was born in Erie, Pennsylvania, the son of William P. "Buddy" Moore, an automotive mechanic, and Mary Catherine O'Brien, a former journalist. His name derives from a character in the comic strip Bringing Up Father.

Moore earned his bachelor's degree from the University of Pittsburgh in 1977. After graduation, he worked as a reporter for United Press International until 1979. He then worked at Falling Springs Films in Chambersburg, Pennsylvania. From 1980 to 1984, he was an actor and dancer. He also served as an editor at the Wharton School of Business of the University of Pennsylvania from 1985 to 1987.

In 1990, Moore completed his Master of Fine Arts in writing at the Louisiana State University. He taught creative writing at Penn State Altoona from 1990 to 2007 and was a professor of English and Director of Creative Writing at Ohio University until 2020.

Moore launched the online literary magazine Brevity in 1997, which focuses on short creative nonfiction essays with a maximum of 750 words. In 2020, he co-edited (with Zoë Bossiere) The Best of Brevity: Twenty Groundbreaking Years of Flash Nonfiction. The New York Times wrote of the book, "The immersive effect of reading this anthology straight through is the opposite of a flash experience, and is also lovely, like rolling down a sidewalk of lit windows...So much beauty, so much grief — the whole range of experience flashing by, leaving impressions as it passes."

Moore published numerous craft guides and writing textbooks over his career, six of which are cited by Poets & Writers magazine on the Best Books for Writers listing. Moore's essays and stories have appeared in The Southern Review, The Georgia Review, Harper's Magazine, The New York Times Sunday Magazine, Creative Nonfiction, The Gettysburg Review, Utne Reader, and Crazyhorse.

Moore is on the editorial board of Creative Nonfiction magazine, and sat on the board of the Association of Writers & Writing Programs from 2006 to 2011, serving as board president in his final year.

== Works ==
=== Non-fiction ===
- The Emperor's Virtual Clothes: The Naked Truth About Internet Culture. Chapel Hill, NC: Algonquin Books. 1995. ISBN 9781565120969.
- The Accidental Buddhist: Mindfulness, Enlightenment, and Sitting Still, American Style. Chapel Hill, NC: Algonquin Books. 1997.
- Between Panic and Desire. Lincoln: University of Nebraska Press. 2008. ISBN 978-0803229822.
- The Mindful Writer: Noble Truths of the Writing Life. Boston, MA: Wisdom Publications. 2012. ISBN 978-1614290070.
- Dear Mister Essay Writer Guy: Advice and Confessions on Life, Love, and Cannibals. NYC: Random House/Ten Speed. 2015. ISBN 978-1607748090.
- To Hell with It: Of Sin and Sex, Chicken Wings, and Dante's Entirely Ridiculous, Needlessly Guilt-Inducing Inferno. Lincoln: University of Nebraska Press. 2021. ISBN 978-1496224606.

=== Short story collections ===
- Toothpick Men. DuBois, PA: Mammoth Books. 1998.

=== Books on the craft of writing ===
- The Truth of the Matter: Art and Craft in Creative Nonfiction. Harlow, England: Longman. 2006. ISBN 9780321277619.
- Crafting the Personal Essay: A Guide to Writing and Publishing Creative Nonfiction. Cincinnati: Writer's Digest Books. 2010. ISBN 9781582977966.
- The Rose Metal Press Field Guide to Writing Flash Nonfiction: Advice and Essential Exercises from Respected Writers, Editors, and Teachers. Boston, MA: Rose Metal Press. 2012. ISBN 978-0984616664.
- The Story Cure: A Book Doctor's Pain-Free Guide to Finishing Your Novel or Memoir. NYC: Random House/Ten Speed. 2017. ISBN 978-0399578809.
- The Best of Brevity: Twenty Groundbreaking Years of Flash Nonfiction. Boston, MA: Rose Metal Press. 2020. ISBN 978-1941628232.
