= Wendy Rawlings =

American novelist, short story writer, essayist and critic

- Born: 1967 (age 58–59); Washington, D.C., U.S.
- Education: Trinity College (BA); Colorado State University (MFA); University of Utah (PhD)
- Occupations: Novelist; short story writer; essayist; critic

Wendy Rawlings (born 1967) is an American novelist, short story writer, essayist, and critic. She is a professor of English at the University of Alabama.

== Early life and education ==
Born in Washington D.C. in 1967, Rawlings grew up in Bayville, New York. She received a B.A. from Trinity College (1988), an M.F.A. from Colorado State University (1996), and a Ph.D. from the University of Utah (2000).

== Career ==
Rawlings is the author of three books. Come Back Irish, a collection of short stories published by Ohio State University Press in 2001, was hailed by Ron Carlson as "a sharp collection rich with mordant humor that colors [Rawlings'] honest take on the tender estrangements that radiate from love and family." In 2007, Rawlings won the Michigan Literary Fiction Award for her novel, The Agnostics, which was published that year by The University of Michigan Press. Novelist Sigrid Nunez called the novel "a poignant, exquisitely focused book." Her third book, Time for Bed, was published by Louisiana State University Press in 2019.

In addition, Rawlings has published short fiction, essays, and criticism in a variety of journals, including AGNI, The Atlantic, Cincinnati Review, Crab Orchard Review, Fourth Genre, Massachusetts Review, The Normal School, Passages North, The Southern Review, Sonora Review, and Tin House.

She has taught creative writing and literature at The University of Alabama since 2000.

== Personal life ==
Rawlings lives in Tuscaloosa, Alabama.

== Published books ==
- Come Back Irish. Short stories. Columbus, Ohio: Ohio State University Press, 2001
- The Agnostics. A novel. Ann Arbor: University of Michigan Press, 2007
- Time for Bed. Stories. Baton Rouge: Louisiana State University Press, 2019

== Awards ==
- The Ohio State University Prize in Short Fiction, 2000
- Michigan Literary Fiction Award, 2007
- Pushcart Prize, 2016
