= Literary Mama =

Literary Mama (LiteraryMama.com) is a U.S.-based online literary magazine focused on publishing writing about motherhood in a variety of genres. The writings found in Literary Mama challenge all types of media to rethink its narrow focus of what mothers think and do. Updated monthly, the departments include columns, creative nonfiction, fiction, Literary Reflections, poetry, Profiles and Reviews, OpEd, and a blog. Literary Mama reaches 40,000 readers monthly.

== History ==
Inspired by the variety of mothers and mothering, co-founder Amy Hudock sought out and gathered women in Berkeley, California interested in reading and writing about motherhood. This group challenged the conventional two-way street of motherhood commonly found in mainstream media: either "sickly sweet" or utterly negative. "We weren't able to get our work published because the glossy parenting magazines only wanted articles that showed only a small part of motherhood and we wanted a place where we could publish our work and find work we wanted to read," says Ms. Hudock. With the collaboration of co-founder Andrea J. Buchanan, Literary Mama: A Literary Magazine for the Maternally Inclined was born. The first issue appeared in November 2003.

== The online magazine today ==
The magazine's mission since 2003, as stated on its website, is to feature "poetry, fiction, columns, and creative nonfiction that may be too raw, too irreverent, too ironic, or too body-conscious for traditional or commercial motherhood publications." A weekly ezine is sent highlighting new works specific to department, column, and the blog. True to the mission of Literary Mama, the magazine encourages Mama and non-Mama writers alike to submit work for review and for possible publication. The Literary Reflections department posts a monthly writing prompt, and classes are offered to help writers reach their goals.

Literary Mama was named by Writer's Digest as one of the "101 Best Websites for Writers" and by Forbes for "Best of the Web".

An anthology of selected pieces from 2003 to 2005 was published in December 2005 by Seal Press, ISBN 1-58005-158-8.

== Editors ==
- Amanda Fields 2022 – Present
- Amanda Jaros 2018 – 2022
- Karna Converse 2016 – 2018
- Maria Scala 2014 – 2016
- Caroline Grant, PhD, Editor in Chief, 2009 – 2014
- Amy Hudock, PhD, 2003 – 2009

== Notable contributors ==
Below is a listing of contributors to the Literary Mama body of work at LiteraryMama.com who have published books:

- Gail Konop Baker, author of Cancer is a Bitch, Da Capo Press, 2008.
- Andrea Buchanan, co-author of The Daring Book for Girls, Collins, 2007.
- Elrena Evans, co-editor of Mama PhD:Women Write about Motherhood and Academic Life, Rutgers University Press, 2008 and This Crowded Night, DreamSeeker Books, 2011.
- Vicki Forman, contributor, Love You to Pieces: Creative Writers on Raising a Child with Special Needs, Beacon Press, 2008
- Caroline Grant, co-editor of Mama PhD:Women Write about Motherhood and Academic Life, Rutgers University Press, 2008
- Ona Gritz, author of Tangerines and Tea: My Grandparents and Me, Abrams Books for Young Readers, 2005
- Jessica Berger Gross, editor of About What Was Lost: Twenty Writers on Miscarriage, Healing, and Hope, Plume, 2006
- Sonya Huber, author of Opa Nobody, University of Nebraska Press, 2008
- Amy Hudock, co-editor of Literary Mama: Reading for the Maternally Inclined, Seal Press, 2005
- Susan Ito, co-editor of A Ghost at Heart's Edge: Stories and Poems of Adoption, North Atlantic Books, 1999
- Suzanne Kamata, editor of Love You to Pieces: Creative Writers on Raising a Child with Special Needs, Beacon Press, 2008
- Sharon Kraus, author of Strange Land, University Press of Florida, 2002
- Ericka Lutz, author of On the Go with Baby, Sourcebooks, 2002
- Jennifer Margulis, author of Why Babies Do That: Baffling Baby Behavior Explained, Willow Creek Press, 2005
- Sophia Raday, author of Love in Condition Yellow: A Memoir of an Unlikely Marriage, Beacon Press, 2009
- Heidi Raykeil, author of Naughty Mommy: How I Found My Lost Libido, Seal Press, 2005
- Rachel Sarah, author of Single Mom Seeking: Playdates, Blind Dates, and Other Dispatches from the Dating World, Seal Press, 2007
- Shari MacDonald Strong, editor of The Maternal Is Political: Women Writers at the Intersection of Motherhood and Social Change, Seal Press, 2008

== Other ==
1. Original graphic for Literary Mama was designed by Andi Buchanan.

2. Graphic for front cover of anthology was designed by Justin Marler and Gerilyn Attebery for Seal Press.
