= Sonya Huber =

American essayist and memoirist

- Born: 1971 (age 54–55) Evergreen Park, Illinois

Sonya Huber is an American essayist and writer of memoir and literary nonfiction. She is an associate professor of creative writing at Fairfield University. She is the author of Pain Woman Takes Your Keys and Other Essays from a Nervous System, Cover Me: A Health Insurance Memoir, Opa Nobody, and other books. Huber's essays have appeared in Creative Nonfiction, Brevity, Hotel Amerika, LitHub, The Rumpus, River Teeth, among other literary journals, and in The New York Times, The Atlantic, The Chronicle of Higher Education, the Washington Post, and the Washington Post Magazine.

== Early life ==
Sonya Huber was born in 1971 in Evergreen Park, Illinois and grew up in New Lenox, Illinois.

== Education ==
Huber earned a BA at Carleton College in 1993 and a Master of Arts in journalism from the Ohio State University in 2000 through the Kiplinger Fellowship in Public Interest Journalism. She received a Master of Fine Arts in Creative Writing from the Ohio State University in 2004.

== Career ==
Huber began teaching writing Fairfield University in Fairfield, Connecticut, in 2011 and as of 2018, was an associate professor there. She formerly taught at Georgia Southern University and Ashland University.

She published Cover Me: A Health Insurance Memoir in 2010, and was diagnosed with rheumatoid arthritis. She wrote Pain Woman Takes Your Keys and Other Essays from a Nervous System five years after her symptoms began. In 2011, she published the textbook The Backwards Research Guide for Writers: Using Your Life for Reflection, Connection, and Inspiration. In 2008, after researching archival German records, she published the creative nonfiction book Opa Nobody, about the anti-Nazi activist work of her grandfather.

In March 2020, she contracted COVID-19, with months of ongoing symptoms.

She served as guest editor for Experiences of Disability, a special issue of Brevity in September 2020. She is the editor of Dogwood: A Journal of Poetry and Prose and has served as a nonfiction editor for Literary Mama.

== Activism ==
A disability advocate, Huber was one of the creators of the 2017 online Disability March. She has been vocal on the topics of disability and for treatment and support for chronic pain patients. She served on the Community Leadership Council of the National Pain Advocacy Center. She was active with Jobs with Justice between 1998 and 2004.

== Awards ==
- 2013 Terrain Nonfiction Award, 2013.
- 2017 Foreword "Indie Next" Book of the Year Silver Award Winner in "Essay" Category for Pain Woman
- 2018 Independent Publishers Association "Independent Voice" Gold Medal for General Excellence
- 2019 Connecticut Individual Artist Grant

== Works ==
=== Non-fiction books ===
- Supremely Tiny Acts: A One-Day Memoir, Mad Creek Books. Columbus, Ohio: Ohio State University Press, 2021. ISBN 978-0814258040
- Pain Woman Takes Your Keys and Other Essays from a Nervous System. Lincoln, Nebraska: University of Nebraska Press, 2017. ISBN 978-0803299917.
- The Evolution of Hillary Rodham Clinton. London: Squint Books, 2016. ISBN 978-1911335276
- The "Backwards" Research Guide for Writers: Using Your Life for Reflection, Connection, and Inspiration. Writing & Pedagogy Series. London: Equinox Publications, 2011. ISBN 978-1845534424
- Cover Me: A Health Insurance Memoir. Class in America Series. Lincoln, Nebraska: University of Nebraska Press, 2010. ISBN 978-0803226234
- Opa Nobody. American Lives Series. Lincoln, Nebraska: University of Nebraska Press, 2008. Paperback, 2013. ISBN 978-0803210806

=== Essays ===
- "The Three Words That Almost Ruined Me As a Writer: Show, Don’t Tell." Lithub, Sept. 27, 2019.
- "Between One and Ten Thousand." Another Chicago Magazine, Dec. 10, 2018.
- "Starbucks and Shipwrecks." Creative Nonfiction, February 2019.
- "Writing with and Through Pain." LitHub, June 25, 2018.
- "Need and Smoke: Voices on Addiction." The Rumpus, March 26, 2018.
- "Does ‘Count Your Blessings’ Work?" The Atlantic, January 4, 2018.
- "Dear Bridgeport." Slag Glass City, 2018.
- "Stop Dismissing Midwestern Literature." Electric Literature, December 13, 2017.
- "The Lunch Lady and Her Three-Headed Dogs." Brevity, Jan. 17, 2017. Reprinted in The Best of Brevity: Twenty Groundbreaking Years of Flash Nonfiction.
- "Divorce Papers: One of the Best Christmas Gifts I’ve Ever Received." Washington Post online, Dec. 22, 2016.
- "Flying the Flannel." Vela, July 14, 2016.
- "I take opioids to treat chronic pain. Stigmatizing them will harm me." The Guardian online, June 22, 2016.
- "If Woman is Five." River Teeth 17.3, Spring 2016.
- "In the Grip of the Sky." Creative Nonfiction 58, Winter 2016.
- "Life is Good." DIAGRAM 16.2, April 2016.
- "The Lava Lamp of Pain." The Rumpus, Dec. 28, 2014.
- "How the ‘Trophy Just for Showing Up’ is Earned." New York Times Motherlode Blog online, March 6, 2014.
- "A Day in the Grammar of Disease." Brevity: The Journal of Concise Nonfiction 43, May 2013.
- "Love and Industry: A Midwestern Workbook." Terrain.org: A Journal of the Built and Natural Environments, Jan. 15, 2013.
- "Glass Beads." Baltimore Review, Summer 2012.
- "Breastfeeding Dick Cheney." Creative Nonfiction 43, Fall/Winter 2011.
- "Prescriptions." Sweet: A Literary Confection 1:2, Spring 2009.
- "Homage to a Bridge." Fourth Genre 10:2, Fall 2008.
- "Employee + Child(ren)." The Washington Post Magazine, Aug. 24, 2008.
- "In Medias Res." Literary Mama, Fall 2006. Reprinted in Mama Ph.D. anthology, ed. Caroline Grant and Elrena Evans. Piscataway, NJ: Rutgers University Press, 2008.
- "My Men." Fourth Genre 4:1, Spring 2002.
