= Howard Mansfield =

American author (born 1957)

Howard Mansfield (born June 14, 1957) is an American author who writes about history, preservation, and architecture. He was born in Huntington, New York, and graduated from Syracuse University in 1979. He lives in Hancock, New Hampshire with his wife, writer Sy Montgomery.

== List of works ==
=== Author ===
- Cosmopolis: Yesterday’s Cities of the Future. Rutgers, Center for Urban Policy Research, 1990. Paperback: Routledge/Transaction Publishers
- In the Memory House. Fulcrum Publishing, 1993.
- Skylark: The Life, Lies and Inventions of Harry Atwood. University Press of New England, 1999.
- The Same Ax, Twice: Restoration and Renewal in a Throwaway Age. University Press of New England, 2000.
- The Bones of the Earth. Shoemaker and Hoard, 2004. Paperback: Counterpoint Press
- Turn and Jump: How Time and Place Fell Apart. Down East, 2010. Paperback: Rowman & Littlefield
- Dwelling in Possibility: Searching for the Soul of Shelter. Bauhan Publishing, 2013
- Sheds. Bauhan Publishing, 2016
- Summer Over Autumn: A Small Book of Small-Town Life. Bauhan Publishing, 2017
- The Habit of Turning the World Upside Down. Bauhan Publishing, 2018
- Chasing Eden: A Book of Seekers. Bauhan Publishing, 2021
- I Will Tell No War Stories: What Our Fathers Left Unsaid About World War II. Lyons Press, 2024.
- Invisible Monuments: Tribute, Memory, and the Summoning of the Past. Lyons Press, 2026.

=== Editor ===
- Where the Mountain Stands Alone. University Press of New England, 2006.

=== Contributed essays ===
- David Rothenberg and Wendee J. Pryor, eds., Writing on Air. The MIT Press, 2003.
- James Aponovich: A Retrospective. Currier Museum of Art, 2005.
- William Morgan, Yankee Modern: The Houses of Estes/Twombly. Princeton Architectural Press, 2009. Foreword.
- Brian Vanden Brink, Ruin: Photographs of a Vanishing America. Down East Books, 2009./Rowman & Littlefield. Introductory essay.
- Beyond the Notches: Stories of Place in New Hampshire’s North Country. Monadnock Institute of Nature, Place and Culture, 2011.
- At the End of Life. Creative Nonfiction Books, 2011.

=== For children ===
- Hogwood Steps Out. Barry Moser, illustrator. Roaring Brook Press, 2008

=== Selected publications ===
Essays and articles on history and architecture have appeared in: Doubletake, The Threepenny Review, American Heritage, Orion, New Letters Quarterly, Washington Post, New York Times, Metropolis, International Design, Yankee, Small Press, Places Quarterly, West Hills Review, SITES, Design Book Review, Historic Preservation, Inland Architect, Christian Science Monitor, Boston Globe, Los Angeles Times, Philadelphia Inquirer, Kansas City Star, Oakland Tribune, Newsday, Arizona Republic, Chicago Tribune, Des Moines Register, Elle Decor, Air & Space/Smithsonian International Herald Tribune, New Hampshire Home, The Magazine Antiques, Creative Nonfiction.

== Praise ==
- “As an excavator and guardian of our living past, Howard Mansfield is unmatched. This decent, unpretentious, wonderful writer possesses the sensibility of a poet combined with boundless curiosity and deep, deep knowledge. In its quiet, persistent, honest search for timelessness and truth amidst the clamor of our uncertain times, Turn & Jump takes us to the very soul of America.” –John Heilpern, Vanity Fair
- "Now and then an idea suddenly bursts into flame, as if by spontaneous combustion. One instance is the recent explosion of American books about the idea of place.... But the best of them, the deepest, the widest-ranging, the most provocative and eloquent is Howard Mansfield's In the Memory House." --Hungry Mind Review
- “Howard Mansfield has never written an uninteresting or dull sentence. All of his books are emotionally and intellectually nourishing. He is something like a cultural psychologist along with being a first-class cultural historian. He is humane, witty, bright-minded, and rigorously intelligent. He and his wife rescued the doomed runt of a litter of pigs and raised it to be the 175-pound Mr. Hogwood, a living symbol of Howard Mansfield’s care for the American, New England, history he writes so well about. His deep subject is Time: how we deal with it and how it deals with us." --Guy Davenport, author of The Death of Picasso
- “Like Thoreau, Mr. Mansfield is a keen observer and, in his neck of New Hampshire, a granitic critic of the rushed life.” -- The Wall Street Journal
- “The Same Ax, Twice is filled with insight and eloquence… a memorable, readable, brilliant book on an important subject. It is a book filled with quotable wisdom.”—Robert Campbell, The New York Times Book Review
- “He writes with wit and passion; he has an eye for the luminous detail, and wears his learning lightly…. In witty essays that recall both Thoreau’s Walden and Roland Barthes’ Mythologies, Mansfield ruminates on American history by unpacking our connection to the landscape.” — Utne Reader on The Bones of the Earth
- Dwelling in Possibility is "a wholly original meditation... Mansfield pursues the essence of dwelling and “the soul of shelter” in a book-length essay that’s part observation of the contemporary built environment, part cultural history, part philosophical account, and at times something like a Whitmanian poetic survey." -- Carlo Rotella, The Boston Globe
- “Hands-down, the finest writer of Yankee life today is this guy, Howard Mansfield. Howard Mansfield sees things differently than most of us, and he points stuff out that most of us miss… Howard Mansfield [has] found a way to unlock the Yankee character.” — Frtiz Wetherbee, Chronicle, WMUR-TV
- "In this moving and absorbing book -- I Will Tell No War Stories -- Howard Mansfield tries to understand his father’s steadfast, lifelong refusal to discuss his service as a 19-year-old B-24 machine gunner during World War II. There was guilt, of both the survivor and the killer, a deep sense of war’s depravity, but mostly there was the shadow of a terror so intense and sustained that not even a long life was enough to escape. To speak of it was to re-enter it. It was, as Mansfield’s research reveals, and as his father knew, an experience so overwhelming that words diminished it, as if trying to draw a frame around the infinite." — Mark Bowden, author of Black Hawk Down: A Story of Modern War"
