= Richard Goodman (writer) =

American nonfiction writer

Richard Goodman (born July 11, 1945) is an American writer of nonfiction. He lives in Lafayette, Louisiana. He is the author of four books of nonfiction. His articles and essays have appeared in the Harvard Review, Ascent, Vanity Fair, The New York Times, Creative Nonfiction, French Review, and The Michigan Quarterly Review, among others. He was educated at the University of Michigan, where he won a Hopwood Award and received a B.A.; at Wayne State University, where he received his M.A.; and at Spalding University, where he received his M.F.A.

== Bibliography ==
- The Bicycle Diaries 2011
- A New York Memoir 2010
- The Soul of Creative Writing 2008
- French Dirt: The Story of a Garden in the South of France 1991/2002
