= Jane Bernstein =

American writer

- Born: June 10, 1949 (age 77) New York City, U.S.
- Occupation: Writer; novelist
- Education: New York University (BA); Columbia University (MFA)

Website
- janebernstein.net

Jane Bernstein (born June 10, 1949) is an American writer and novelist.

== Biography ==
Born in Brooklyn, Bernstein received her Bachelor of Arts at New York University and her Master of Fine Arts at Columbia University. She is a professor of English at Carnegie Mellon University, where she has taught since 1991.

She lives in Pittsburgh with Jeffrey F. Cohn, Professor of Psychology at the University of Pittsburgh, and she is the mother of Rachel Glynn and filmmaker Charlotte Glynn.

== Other works ==
Her short works have been widely published in journals and magazines, including The New York Times Magazine, Glamour, Fourth Genre, Creative Nonfiction, and Massachusetts Review.

From 1974 to 1993, she worked as a screenwriter. Her co-written screenplay for Seven Minutes in Heaven was released by Warner Brothers in 1986. The movie won a Special Merit Award at the U.S. Film Festival in Santa Barbara, California in 1987 and an audience award at the Sundance Film Festival in 1986.

== Fellowships and awards ==
Bernstein was twice the recipient of a National Endowment for the Arts Fellowship in Creative Writing, in 1982–1983 and in 2000–2001. She was awarded a Pennsylvania Council on the Arts Fellowship in Media Arts in 1995 and in Creative Writing in 2002. Other fellowships and awards include two New Jersey State Council on the Arts Fellowships, and in 2004, a Fulbright Fellowship, which she spent at Bar-Ilan University in Ramat Gan, Israel. Awards for her essays include The Virginia Faulkner Award for Excellence in Writing in 2001.

== Books ==
- Departures, Holt, Rinehart and Winston, 1979, ISBN 978-0-03-048216-8
- Seven Minutes in Heaven, Fawcett Juniper, 1986, ISBN 978-0-449-70139-3
- Loving Rachel: a family's journey from grief, Little, Brown, 1988, ISBN 978-0-316-09204-3
- Bereft – A Sister’s Story, North Point Press, 2000, ISBN 978-0-86547-586-1
- Rachel in the World, University of Illinois Press, 2007, ISBN 978-0-252-03253-0
- Second Lives - Tales from Two Cities, Jane Bernstein and Rodge Glass, eds., Cargo Publishing, 2012, ISBN 978-1908885029
- Gina from Siberia, with Charlotte Glynn, illustrations by Anna Desnitskaya, Animal Media Group, 2018, ISBN 978-1947895003
- The Face Tells the Secret, Regal House, 2019, ISBN 978-1947548787

== Trivia ==
In the summer of 1977, while helping director Jonathan Kaplan cast the film Over the Edge, a teen rebellion film released in 1979, she met Matt Dillon at the Hommocks Middle School in Larchmont, New York, thus launching his acting career.
