= Rita Ciresi =

American novelist

- Born: 1961 (age 63–64); New Haven, Connecticut, U.S.
- Occupation: Novelist - Short Stories
- Education: Pennsylvania State University (MFA)
- Period: 1993–present
- Subject: Women's Fiction - Romantic Comedy - Memoir - Illness and Grief
- Notable works: Mother Rocket - Pink Slip - Blue Italian
- Notable awards: 2002 Flannery O'Connor Award for Short Fiction - 2017 Jeanne Leiby Memorial Chapbook Series Award

Website
- www.ritaciresi.com

Rita Ciresi (born in 1961) is an American short story writer and novelist. She is the author of three novels that address the Italian-American experience.

== Early life and career ==
Ciresi was born in New Haven, Connecticut, a city which serves as the backdrop for most of her fiction. She attended Penn State University, and graduated with an M.F.A.

Ciresi is the author of several novels, short stories, and pieces of flash fiction that have appeared in magazines such as Cosmopolitan, Creative Nonfiction, Brevity, South Carolina Review, California Quarterly, and Prairie Schooner. She has also had anthologies published by Penguin, Purdue University Press, and Feminist Press. She has written romantic comedies, such as Love on Longboat Key, under the pen name of Meg West. Her fiction has been translated or optioned for translation in German, Dutch, Greek, Polish, and Bulgarian. Ciresi is well regarded for her writing style, and on her novel Pink Slip, she is appreciated for her ability to mix the tragic and the comic aspects of love in a hilarious fashion.

Ciresi has received support from the state arts council of Pennsylvania, Virginia, and Florida. She has been in residence at the American Academy in Rome, Hawthornden International Writers' Retreat, Sozopol Fiction Seminars, Martha's Vineyard Writers Residency, Virginia Center for the Arts, Atlantic Center for the Arts, Santa Fe Art Institute, and the Helene Wurlitzer Foundation. She has written the first and final drafts of most of her work at the Ragdale Foundation.

Ciresi has served as a fiction editor of 2 Bridges Review, an annual published by New York City College of Technology. She currently rests as a retired faculty of the University of South Florida, where she was a professor emerita. Ciresi served as director of M.F.A. theses that resulted in publication and worked alongside former students.

== Bibliography ==
=== Collections and Novels ===
- Mother Rocket (University of Georgia Press, 1993)
- Blue Italian (Ecco Press, 1996)
- Pink Slip (Delacorte Press, 1998)
- Sometimes I Dream in Italian (Delta Publishing, 2000)
- Remind Me Again Why I Married You (Delta Publishing, 2003)
- Bring Back My Body to Me (2012)
- Second Wife (Burrow Press, 2018)

=== Meg West's Romantic Comedies ===
- Love on Longboat Key (The Keys to His Heart, Book 1) (Champagne Book Group, 2017)
- Love on Lido Key (The Keys to His Heart, Book 2) (Champagne Book Group, 2018)
- Love on the Links (The Keys to His Heart, Book 3) (Champagne Book Group, 2019)

== Awards ==
- Barnes & Noble Discover New Writers Series for Blue Italian
- 1993 Finalist for the Los Angeles Times' Art Seidenbaum Award for First Fiction
- 1997 Pirate's Alley Faulkner Award for Fiction for Pink Slip
- 2002 Flannery O'Connor Award for Short Fiction for Mother Rocket
- 2017 Jeanne Leiby Memorial Chapbook Series Award for Second Wife
- 2019 F(r)iction Creative Writing Award for 'merigan
- 2022 Accenti Writing Contest Prize for Anywhere in the World
