= Valerie Boyd =

American writer and academic (1963–2022)

- Born: December 11, 1963; Atlanta, Georgia, U.S.
- Died: February 12, 2022 (aged 58); Atlanta, Georgia, U.S.
- Occupations: Academic; journalist; writer
- Writing career
- Notable work: Wrapped in Rainbows: The Life of Zora Neale Hurston

Valerie Boyd (December 11, 1963 – February 12, 2022) was an American writer and academic. She was best known for her biography of Zora Neale Hurston entitled Wrapped in Rainbows: The Life of Zora Neale Hurston. She was an associate professor and the Charlayne Hunter-Gault Distinguished Writer-in-Residence at the Grady College of Journalism and Mass Communication at the University of Georgia, where she taught narrative nonfiction writing, as well as arts and literary journalism.

== Early life ==
Boyd was born in Atlanta, Georgia, on December 11, 1963. Her father operated a gas station and tire shop; her mother was a housewife. Boyd studied at Northwestern University's Medill School of Journalism, graduating with a Bachelor of Science in 1985. She subsequently undertook postgraduate studies at Goucher College, obtaining a Master of Fine Arts in creative nonfiction writing in 1999.

== Career ==
=== Journalism ===
Boyd first worked as a copy editor for the Atlanta Journal-Constitution starting in 1985. She later became a reporter, book critic and line editor for the paper. Boyd founded EightRock, a cutting-edge journal of black arts and culture, in 1990. Two years later, she co-founded HealthQuest, the first nationally distributed magazine focusing on African-American health, and served as its editor in chief. Her articles, essays and reviews also appear in The Journal of Blacks in Higher Education, Ms., Paste, The Oxford American, Book, Essence, The Washington Post, The Los Angeles Times, Creative Nonfiction, African American Review, and other publications. Boyd eventually became Arts Editor of the Journal-Constitution, a position she held until leaving the newspaper in 2004.

Published in 2003, Boyd's Wrapped in Rainbows was the first biography of author and anthropologist Zora Neale Hurston in 25 years. Boyd said she felt a strong connection to the author since first reading Hurston's novel, Their Eyes Were Watching God, during her freshman year at Northwestern University. She describes her experience as feeling called to the challenge of writing Wrapped in Rainbows when she heard Hurston's first biographer, Robert Hemenway, a white male, speak at the 1994 Zora Neale Hurston Festival of the Arts and Humanities in Eatonville, Florida. Hemenway suggested it was time for a new biography and this time it needed to be written by a black woman.

The Washington Post declared Wrapped in Rainbows "the definitive Hurston biography for many years to come." Pulitzer Prize-winning author Alice Walker has said of Boyd's work, "This daughter, Valerie Boyd, has written a biography of Zora Neale Hurston that will be the standard for years to come. Offering vivid splashes of Zora's colorful humor, daring individualism and refreshing insouciance, Boyd has done justice to a dauntless spirit and heroic life."

=== Academia ===
After leaving the Journal-Constitution in 2004, Boyd went into academia. She was named Charlayne Hunter-Gault Distinguished Writer-in-Residence at Henry W. Grady College of Journalism and Mass Communication three years later. She co-founded the Alice Walker Literary Society in 1997, together with Beverly Guy-Sheftall and Rudolph Byrd. She was also an elected board member for the National Book Critics Circle.

Boyd traveled the United States giving speeches and lectures on the life and legacy of Zora Neale Hurston as a part of the Big Read, a program sponsored by the National Endowment for the Arts designed to re-establish reading for pleasure as a popular American pastime.

== Later life ==
Boyd was named editor-at-large of the University of Georgia Press in 2021. Simon & Schuster/37 Ink was scheduled to publish her book, Gathering Blossoms Under Fire: The Journals of Alice Walker, posthumously in the spring of 2022.

Boyd died on February 12, 2022, at a hospital in Atlanta. She was 58, and suffered from pancreatic cancer prior to her death.

== Awards and recognition ==
Boyd received the Georgia Author of the Year Award in nonfiction as well as an American Library Association Notable Book citation for her work on Wrapped in Rainbows. The Georgia Center for the Book named it one of the "25 Books That All Georgians Should Read", and the Southern Book Critics Circle honored it with the 2003 Southern Book Award for best nonfiction of the year. Boyd was inducted into the Georgia Writers Hall of Fame in 2021. A documentary about Boyd's life and work, Zora Head: The Life and Scholarship of Valerie Boyd, was debuted at the BronzeLens Film Festival in 2024.
