= Judith Barrington (poet) =

American poet and activist (born 1944)

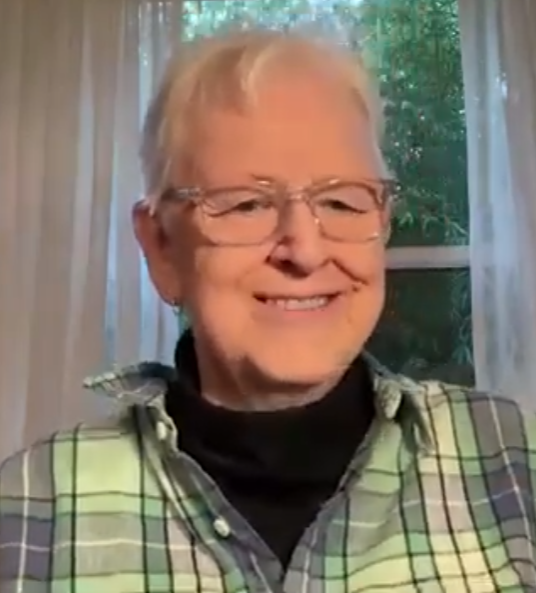
- In a 2024 interview
- Born: July 7, 1944 (age 82); Brighton and Hove, England
- Occupations: Poet, teacher, activist
- Spouse: Ruth Gundle (m. 2013)

Judith Barrington (born July 7, 1944) is an American poet, memoirist, teacher, and feminist activist. She has published five books of poetry, three poetry chapbooks, two memoirs and a book on memoir for writers. She co-founded The Flight of the Mind, a residential summer writing program for women (1984–2000) and Soapstone: A Writing Retreat for Women (now called Soapstone: Celebrating Women Writers).

== Early life ==
Barrington was born in Brighton and Hove, England, during an air raid to Reginald Jack Christie Barrington and Violet Elizabeth Helene (née Lambert). The family returned to England from Barcelona after fleeing on the eve of the Spanish Civil War.

Barrington grew up in Brighton as the youngest of three children and studied at St. Mary's Hall. After graduation, she moved to London, where she worked for BBC Television. In 1963, when she was 19, her parents drowned on Greek Line's Lakonia after the ship caught fire at sea.

Afterwards, she moved to Spain, where she began translation work and also worked as a tour guide for the Perelada Castle near Figueres. After three years at Perelada, she worked in London as a public relations executive for Eric White and Partners and then as a director of Utilair Limited, the ventilation company founded by her father and inherited by her brother. In 1969 she married Colin Marsh; they divorced eleven months later.

Barrington moved to Portland, Oregon, in 1976 where she taught part-time in the women's studies program at Portland State University and worked at the Oregon Commission for Women. As her writing life evolved she began to support herself as a freelance writer and teacher of creative writing.

She met Ruth Gundle in 1979. They became domestic partners in 2008 when it was first made available in Oregon and married in 2013 when same-sex couples could marry in Washington state. They make their home in Portland, Oregon.

== Writing career ==
Barrington wrote poetry and essays through childhood and adolescence. In 1972, she joined a feminist writing group in London, "The Literature Collective." Barrington's first published poems appeared in the U.K. feminist journal, Spare Rib. In 1975, Lilian Mohin, a member of the group and an aspiring publisher, printed Barrington's first chapbook, Deviation, at the Camberwell School of Arts and Crafts.

Barrington's poetry consists of lyric and narrative work, occasionally experimental, and frequently interspersed with traditional forms. Her second book, History and Geography, opens with a sequence of five villanelles addressed to her drowned mother; the deaths of her parents at sea are a subject that recurs in her work. Reviews of the early poetry often focus on her use of landscape, which some suggest becomes a character in the work alongside the humans and other animals. Other themes include lesbian identity, honesty and the power of speech, mortality, a love of horses and living with limited mobility. Her poetry has won numerous awards including the Gregory O'Donaghue International Poetry Prize, the Dulwich Festival International Poetry Competition, and the International Laurence Durrell Society White Mice Poetry Prize. Trying to Be an Honest Woman was selected by the Oregon Cultural Heritage Commission as one of the "Hundred Most Important Books by Oregon Authors from 1800 to 2000." Horses and the Human Soul was selected by the Oregon State Library for "150 Books for the Sesquicentennial" from among books by Oregon writers, 1836–2009.

Each of Barrington's first two collections of poetry contains a short memoir. She was drawn to the genre before creative nonfiction became popular. When she set out to write Lifesaving, a memoir about her life in Franco's Spain in the early 1960s following her parents' deaths, she needed the expansiveness of memoir. She would go on to write short memoirs for literary magazines and anthologies, some of which were eventually collected in Virginia's Apple which won the 2026 Oregon Book Award. Lifesaving won the Lambda Book Award and was a finalist for the PEN/Martha Albrand Award for the Art of the Memoir.

Beginning in the early 1980s, Barrington taught writing workshops at writing conferences and festivals around the U.S. and the U.K., as well as in Spain, Greece, and Mexico. She served on the faculty of the University of Alaska, Anchorage MFA program and was a visiting writer at many universities in the U.S. and U.K. During the 1980s she taught poetry to high school students in urban and rural communities across Oregon through the Writers in the Schools program. Her workshops on memoir became the basis for Writing the Memoir: From Truth to Art.

== Feminist activism ==
Barrington became involved in the Women's Liberation Movement in London in 1971. She joined a consciousness raising group and participated in feminist conferences and demonstrations around the U.K. In 1973 she became one of four workers at the Women's Liberation Workshop in Earlham Street, Covent Garden, which coordinated activities of movement groups around England.

When she moved to the U.S. in 1976, she became active in the Portland, Oregon feminist community and began to write articles and book reviews for feminist journals and magazines. She organized and taught her first writing workshops for women, "Getting Started as Often as It Takes." As the activism of the seventies turned into the backlash of the 1980s she and Ruth Gundle started The Flight of the Mind, a residential writing workshop program for women on the McKenzie River in the foothills of Oregon's Cascade Mountains. It began as a week-long workshop in 1983 with Barrington and Barbara Wilson as teachers. By its final year in 2000 there were two week-long sessions with five teachers each week and a support and cooking staff of nine. It attracted teachers and participants from around the U.S. and U.K.

In 1992 Barrington and Ruth Gundle founded Soapstone, a grassroots nonprofit organization that bought a cabin in Oregon's Coast Range to use as a writing retreat for women. It stood on twenty-two acres of forest beside a salmon-spawning creek. In 2013 the property was sold after a conservation trust was secured through the North Coast Land Trust. Soapstone continued as a nonprofit organization redesigned to include a program of study groups on women writers and the Bread and Roses International Women's Day Award.

Barrington's feminist activism has been recognized in a variety of ways including the "Freedom of Expression Award" from the ACLU of Oregon, the Jeannette Rankin Award from the Oregon Women's Political Caucus, and along with Ruth Gundle, the Stuart H. Holbrook Award from Literary Arts for outstanding contributions to Oregon's literary life.

== Publications ==
- Trying to Be an Honest Woman: Poems. The Eighth Mountain Press. 1985. ISBN 0-933377-00-2
- History and Geography: Poems. The Eighth Mountain Press. 1989. ISBN 0-933377-02-9
- Writing the Memoir: From Truth to Art. The Eighth Mountain Press. 1997. ISBN 0-933377-40-1 Second Edition. 2002 ISBN 0-933377-50-9 Published in Australia by Allen & Unwin, in Germany 1997; in translation, by Autorenhaus Plinke 2004, and in China, in translation, by China Renmin University Press, 2005.
- Lifesaving: A Memoir. The Eighth Mountain Press. 2000. ISBN 0-933377-44-4. Published in Germany in translation by Heyne Verlag, 2000, and edition fünf, 2014.
- An Intimate Wilderness: Lesbian Writers on Sexuality. (editor) The Eighth Mountain Press. 1991. ISBN 0-933377-09-6.
- Horses and the Human Soul: Poems. Story Line Press. 2004. ISBN 1-58654-040-8.
- Lost Lands: Poems. Seven Kitchens Press. 2008. ISBN 978-0-9820372-2-5.
- Postcard from the Bottom of the Sea: Poems. The Eighth Mountain Press. 2008. ISBN 978-0-933377-53-0.
- The Conversation: Poems. Salmon Poetry, Ireland. 2015. ISBN 978-1-908836-94-6.
- Long Love: New and Selected Poems, 1985 – 2017. Salmon Poetry, Ireland. 2018. ISBN 978-1-908836-94-6.
- Virginia's Apple: Collected Memoirs. 2024. Oregon State University Press.
