= Marcia Aldrich =

American author

- Born: Allentown, Pennsylvania, U.S.
- Occupations: Nonfiction writer, essayist, memoirist
- Writing career
- Genre: Literary nonfiction

Marcia Aldrich is an American author of literary nonfiction and memoir.

== Early life and education ==
Marcia Aldrich was born and raised in Allentown, Pennsylvania. She graduated from Pomona College, in Claremont, California, and earned a master's in creative writing and a doctorate in English literature at the University of Washington.

== Career ==
Aldrich taught creative writing and English literature at Michigan State University from 1990 until her retirement in 2017. In 2010 she was the Mary Routt Chair of Writing at Scripps College. From 2008 to 2011 she edited Fourth Genre, one of the premiere journals featuring personal essays and memoirs.

She received the Amoco Foundation Excellence in Teaching Award in 1995 and the Michigan State University Alumni Club of Mid-Michigan's Quality in Undergraduate Teaching Award in 2009. In 2010 she was named Distinguished Professor of the Year by the Presidents Council of the State Universities of Michigan.

== Works ==
Aldrich is the author of the free memoir Girl Rearing, published by W.W. Norton, which was selected for the Barnes & Noble Discover New Writers Series and cited among Notable Twentieth Century American Literary Nonfiction in The Best American Essays of the Century, edited by Joyce Carol Oates (Houghton Mifflin).

The collection Waveform: Twenty-First-Century Essays by Women, edited by Aldrich, appeared in 2016.

In 2022 Aldrich published Edge, a chapbook of essays from New Michigan Press. Her own account of this work appeared in Essay Daily.

Aldrich's most recent volume is Studio of the Voice, a collection of essays published in 2024 by Wandering Aengus Press.

=== Essays ===
One of the memoir essays from Girl Rearing, "Hair," was published in The Best American Essays, selected by Joseph Epstein. "Hair" has also been included in the college edition of Best American Essays, in The Beacon Book of Essays by Contemporary American Women, and in Laughing Matters, edited by Marvin Diogenes, in a chapter called "Observations on Gender."

Her essay "The Art of Being Born," originally published in Hotel Amerika, was selected by Cheryl Strayed for inclusion in The Best American Essays 2013.

Eighteen of her essays have been selected as Notable Essays in the Best American Essays series.

Her personal essays have also been published in the Gettysburg Review, North American Review, Witness, Arts and Letters, Northwest Review, Brevity, The Normal School, Kenyon Review, Hotel Amerika, and Seneca Review, among others.

== Selected works ==
- "The Art of Being Born," originally published in Hotel Amerika. Selected by Cheryl Strayed for inclusion in their Best American Essays of 2013
- Companion to an Untold Story, University of Georgia Press, 2012
- "Kincaid’s Bite," Fourth Genre, Spring 2012
- "Marilyn Monroe’s Feet," Kenyon Review, Summer 2011
- "Of Pumps and Death", Normal School, Spring 2011
- Girl Rearing, Norton, 1998.
