= Elizabeth Mosier =

American writer

Novelist and essayist Elizabeth Mosier logged 1,000 volunteer hours processing colonial-era artifacts at Philadelphia's Independence National Historical Park Archeology Laboratory to write Excavating Memory: Archaeology and Home (New Rivers Press, 2019). A graduate of Bryn Mawr College and the MFA Program for Writers at Warren Wilson College, she has twice been named a discipline winner/fellowship finalist by the Pew Fellowships in the Arts, and has received fellowships from Yaddo, Vermont Studio Center, The Millay Colony for the Arts, and the Pennsylvania Council on the Arts. Her nonfiction has been selected as notable in Best American Essays and appears widely in journals and newspapers including Cleaver, Creative Nonfiction, The Philadelphia Inquirer, and Poets and Writers. From 2015 - 2020, she wrote the "U-Curve" and “Intersections” columns for the Bryn Mawr Alumnae Bulletin.

== Biography ==
Mosier grew up in Arizona, the setting for her early stories published in Seventeen, Sassy, Puerto del Sol, Cimarron Review, The Inquirer Magazine, and Valley Quarterly.

She studied psychology at Bryn Mawr College, where she wrote a bi-weekly column for The Bryn Mawr-Haverford Bi-College News. She earned a master's degree in fiction from the MFA Program for Writers at Warren Wilson College.

Bryn Mawr, where Mosier taught creative writing from 1996 - 2013, was the setting for her first novel, My Life as a Girl. Her administrative career at the college includes recruiting students as an admissions officer, writing and producing admissions publications, directing a summer residential writing program for high school students, and serving as Acting Director of Admissions for the Class of 2006. She is currently a member of Bryn Mawr's Communications Advisory Board.

Beyond Bryn Mawr, Mosier taught creative writing for 30 years, to students from elementary school to adult, in a variety of settings including libraries, middle school residencies, writing conferences, art centers, and programs including the University of the Arts Summer Institute, the Bennington College July Program, the Pennsylvania Young Writers’ Day program, and the Carnegie Mellon Institute for Talented Elementary and Secondary Students.

Mosier's volunteer work as a technician at the Independence National Historical Park Archaeology Laboratory led to a literary interest in archaeology. In an interview with Nathaniel Popkin, she says, "I'm fascinated by how artifacts that form the archaeological record constitute and, in some cases, correct the stories we tell ourselves about who we are and how we live. Like archaeologists, writers are always looking for artifacts that support or subvert what we think is true."

== Work ==
Mosier's book of essays, Excavating Memory: Archaeology and Home, was praised by Charles Baxter, who wrote, “The strings of a violin have to be held in place on both ends, and the two poles of Elizabeth Mosier’s book are memory (as archaeology) and forgetting (in the very moving passages about the author’s mother and her descent into the blankness of Alzheimer’s). The music of this book is very fine indeed, and its passion is for the preservation of objects, moments, persons, and places that Elizabeth Mosier has loved. In its clear-sighted lyric eloquence, this book is unforgettable.”

In an interview with novelist Curtis Smith, Mosier said, "These essays are actually a return to what I did first and maybe love most."

Mosier's first novel, My Life as a Girl, was published by Random House in 1999. Publishers Weekly praised the young adult novel, citing its "lifelike dialogue, three-dimensional characters and upbeat outcome, the novel also serves up glossy, attention-getting prose." Another book, the novella The Playgroup, was published by Gemma Media in 2011 as part of the Open Door series to promote adult literacy.
