= Lori Jakiela =

American author of memoirs and poetry

- Education: Gannon University
- Occupation: Author
- Writing career
- Notable awards: William Saroyan International Prize for Writing (2016)

Lori Jakiela is an American author of memoirs and poetry. She won Stanford University's William Saroyan International Prize for Writing for non-fiction for her third memoir, Belief Is Its Own Kind of Truth Maybe, in 2016.

== Education and career ==
Jakiela was raised in Trafford, Pennsylvania and attended Gannon University. She is a professor of English at the University of Pittsburgh at Greensburg, and has also taught at Chatham University and served as co-director of the Chautauqua Institution's Summer Writers Festival.

== Recognition ==
Jakiela won Stanford University's William Saroyan International Prize for Writing for non-fiction for her third memoir, Belief Is Its Own Kind of Truth Maybe, in 2016. She was awarded a City of Asylum residency in Belgium in 2015.

She has been nominated for the Pushcart Prize.

== Personal life ==
Jakiela has worked as a flight attendant and as a freelance journalist, including The New York Times. the Pittsburgh Post-Gazette and The Washington Post. She is married to novelist Dave Newman.

== Selected works ==
=== Memoir ===
- They Write Your Name on a Grain of Rice: On Cancer, Love and Living Even So (Atticus Books, 2023)
- Belief Is Its Own Kind of Truth, Maybe (Atticus Books, 2015; Autumn House Press, 2019)
- The Bridge to Take When Things Get Serious (C&R Press, 2013)
- Miss New York Has Everything (Hatchette 2006)

=== Essays ===
- Portrait of the Artist as a Bingo Worker: Essays on Work and the Writing Life (Bottom Dog Press, 2017)
- Ed. by M.J. Fievre. All that Glitters: A Sliver of Stone Anthology (Lominy Books, 2013)
- Ed by Sheryl St. Germain and Margaret Whitford. Between Song and Story: Essays for the 21st Century (Autumn Press House, 2011)
- Ed. by Elizabeth Penfield. Short Takes: Model Essays for Composition (Pearson)
- Ed. by Lee Gutkind. Keep It Real: Everything You Need to Know about Researching and Writing Creative Nonfiction (W.W. Norton, 2008)
- Ed. by Dinty Moore. The Truth of the Matter: Art and Craft in Creative Nonfiction (Pearson, 2006)

=== Poetry ===
- How Do You Like It Now, Gentlemen? Poems at Mid-Life (Brickhouse Books, 2021)
- Spot the Terrorist (Turning Point 2012)
- The Regulars (Liquid Paper Press, 2001)
- Red Eye (Pudding House, 2010)
- The Mill Hunk's Daughter Meets the Queen of Sky (Finishing Line, 2011)
- Big Fish (Stranded Oak Press, 2016)
