= Sallie Tisdale =

American writer and essayist

- Born: April 15, 1957 (age 69); United States
- Education: Wesleyan University
- Writing career
- Genres: Non-fiction, essays, memoir
- Notable awards: Regional Arts and Culture Council Literary Fellowship, Pushcart Prize, NEA Fellowship, the James Phelan Literary Award, Dorothy and Arthur Shoenfeldt Distinguished Writer of the Year
- Website: sallietisdale.com

Sallie Tisdale (born 1957) is an American writer and essayist whose work has appeared in Harper’s, The New Yorker, The New York Times, and Tricycle, among other magazines. She is the author of ten books, and winner of numerous literary awards. Earning a nursing degree in 1983 and writing in her off-hours from medical practice, her first book was on medical miracles (1986), her second on day to day life in a nursing home (1987), which was followed that year by an essay in Harper's on working in an abortion clinic. Tisdale currently teaches part-time in the writing program at Portland State University.

== Awards and honors ==
- Regional Arts and Culture Council Literary Fellowship
- Pushcart Prize
- NEA Fellowship
- The James Phelan Literary Award
- The Dorothy and Arthur Shoenfeldt Distinguished Writer of the Year

== Bibliography ==
- The Sorcerer’s Apprentice (McGraw-Hill, NY, 1986) OCLC 294106956
- Harvest Moon (Henry Holt, NY, 1987) OCLC 8331321
- Lot’s Wife (Henry Holt, NY, 1988) OCLC 16727698
- Stepping Westward (Henry Holt, NY, 1992) OCLC 24927101
- Talk Dirty to Me (Doubleday, NY, 1994) OCLC 32096595
- "Meat". The Antioch Review. Summer 1994. (Note: Excerpted in the November 1994 issue of Harper's Magazine, pp.35–37.)
- The Best Thing I Ever Tasted (Riverhead Books, NY, 2000) OCLC 27953683
- Women of the Way (HarperCollins, San Francisco, 2006) OCLC 865293938
- Violation: Collected Essays (Hawthorne Books, Portland, 2016)OCLC 4676697733
- Advice for Future Corpses (And Those Who Love Them) (Touchstone Books, NY, 2018) OCLC 2597317879
- The Lie About the Truck: Survivor, Reality TV, and the Endless Gaze (Simon and Schuster, NY, 2021) OCLC 1285123015

———————

Bibliography notes
