= Mary Quade =

American writer of poetry and nonfiction (born 1971)

Mary Quade (born October 21, 1971) is an American writer of poetry and nonfiction. In 2003, her poetry collection Guide to Native Beasts won the Cleveland State University Poetry Center First Book Prize, chosen by judge Marilyn Krysl. Her second collection, Local Extinctions, was published in 2016 by Gold Wake Press. Her essay collection Zoo World, won the 2022 The Journal Non/Fiction Prize, chosen by judge Michelle Herman, and was published in 2023 by The Ohio State University / Mad Creek Books Imprint in 2023. She earned her A.B. from the University of Chicago and her M.F.A. from The University of Iowa Writers’ Workshop. Her work has been awarded an Oregon Literary Fellowship (2001) and five Ohio Arts Council Individual Excellence Awards (Poetry 2006, Poetry 2010, Nonfiction 2014, Nonfiction 2020, Nonfiction 2026). She is a professor of English at Hiram College, where she teaches creative writing.

== Bibliography ==
- Zoo World: Essays (The Ohio State University Press / Mad Creek Books, 2023)
- Local Extinctions (Gold Wake Press, 2016)
- Guide to Native Beasts (Cleveland State University Poetry Center, 2004)

=== Anthologies ===
- Joyce Dyer, Jennifer Cognard-Black, Elizabeth MacLeod Walls, eds. (2016) From Curlers to Chainsaws: Women and Their Machines. Michigan State University.
- Jen Hirt, Erin Murphy, eds. (2016). Creating Nonfiction: Twenty Essays and Interviews with the Writers. SUNY.
- Okla Elliot, Hannah Stephenson, eds. (2015). New Poetry from the Midwest 2014. New American Press.
- H.L. Hix, ed. (2008). New Voices: Contemporary Poetry from the United States. Irish Pages.
- Karen Y. Olsen, ed (2005). On the Wing: American Poems of Air and Space Flight.
