= Jane Alison =

Australian author

Jane Alison (born 1961) is an Australia-born author based in the U.S.

== Early life and education ==
Jane Alison was born in Canberra in 1961, the child of Australian diplomats. When she was four, her parents met and soon exchanged partners with a couple in the U.S. Foreign Service whose family mirrored her own. Her name and nationality changed, and she subsequently grew up in Los Angeles; Quito, Ecuador; and Washington, D.C., where her mother took Alison and her siblings when the second marriage dissolved. She attended public schools in D.C. and then earned a B.A. in classics from Princeton University in 1983. Before writing fiction, she worked as an administrator for the National Endowment for the Humanities, as a production artist for the Washington City Paper, as an editor for the Miami New Times, and as a proposal and speech writer for Tulane University. She also worked as a freelance editor and illustrator before attending Columbia University to study creative writing.

== Literary career ==
Alison's first novel, about the exile of Roman poet Ovid, The Love-Artist, was published in 2001 by Farrar, Straus & Giroux. It was followed by The Marriage of the Sea, a novel set in New Orleans and Venice about four men, three women, food, architecture, love, despair, and water, named a New York Times Notable Book of 2003. Natives and Exotics, from 2005—about one family's centuries-long effort to belong to a land, set in Scotland, the Azores, Australia, and Ecuador—was one of that summer's recommended readings by Alan Cheuse of National Public Radio. Her highly acclaimed memoir, The Sisters Antipodes, traces her upbringing in a doubled, mirrored family and was excerpted as a "Modern Love" column. She followed it with a nonfiction novel, Nine Island, about living alone in Miami and wrestling with the problem of sexual love; at the same time, she worked on translations of Ovid's stories of sexual transformation, Change Me. Her 2019 book on the craft and theory of writing, Meander, Spiral, Explode: Design and Pattern in Narrative, is about finding unconventional structures in narrative beyond the masculo-sexual dramatic arc. The book is widely taught and cited in creative writing programs across the country, as well as being named a Best Book of 2019 by Atlantic Monthly and elsewhere. Her most recent book is Villa E, a novel inspired by the legendary battle between Modernist architects Eileen Gray and Le Corbusier. Her short fiction and critical writing have appeared in The Paris Review, New York Times, Washington Post, Boston Globe, Oprah Daily, Lit Hub, and elsewhere, and her books have been translated into a dozen languages, as well as adapted to music by composer Thomas Sleeper.

She has taught writing and literature at Bryn Mawr College and the University of Miami and since 2013 has been professor of creative writing at the University of Virginia. She divides her time between Charlottesville and Campeche, Mexico, with her partner, architect Edward Tuck.

== Bibliography ==
=== Memoir ===
- The Sisters Antipodes, ISBN 0-15-101280-6 (Houghton Mifflin Harcourt, 2009)

=== Fiction ===
- The Love-Artist: A Novel, ISBN 0-312-42006-4 (Farrar, Straus and Giroux, 2001)
- The Marriage of the Sea, ISBN 0-374-19941-8 (Farrar, Straus and Giroux, 2003)
- Natives and Exotics, ISBN 0-15-603247-3 (Harcourt, 2005)
- Nine Island, ISBN 978-1-936787-12-8 (Catapult, 2016)
- Villa E: A Novel ISBN 1324095059 (Liveright Publishing/ WW Norton, 2024)

=== Translation ===
- Change Me: Stories of Sexual Transformation from Ovid ISBN 0199941653 (Oxford, 2014)

=== Criticism and other non-fiction ===
- Meander, Spiral, Explode: Design and Pattern in Narrative, ISBN 978-1948226134 (Catapult, 2019)
