= Matthew Gavin Frank =

American writer (born 1976)

- Born: November 25, 1976 (age 49); Chicago, Illinois
- Occupation: Writer
- Writing career
- Genres: Creative nonfiction, lyric essay, poetry
- Website: matthewgfrank.com

Matthew Gavin Frank (born 1976) is an American writer, specializing in creative nonfiction, the lyric essay, literary food and travel writing, and poetry.

== Life ==
Matthew Gavin Frank grew up in Illinois, before graduating from Arizona State University with an MFA.

He has previously taught at Grand Valley State University and continues to teach in the English department at Northern Michigan University, where he is also the Nonfiction and Hybrid Editor of the literary journal Passages North.

His nonfiction books include, Flight of the Diamond Smugglers: A Tale of Pigeons, Obsession, and Greed Along Coastal South Africa (2021) — named a finalist for the Heartland Booksellers Award in Nonfiction and an NPR Best Book of 2021 —, The Mad Feast (2015), Preparing the Ghost (2014), Pot Farm (2012), and Barolo (2010). Frank's books of poetry include, The Morrow Plots (2013), Warranty in Zulu (2010), and Sagittarius Agitprop (2009).

Frank's work has appeared in numerous magazines, including The New Republic, Conjunctions, The Iowa Review, Gulf Coast, The Kenyon Review, Salon, and Gastronomica and has been anthologized in The Best Travel Writing, Best Food Writing, and Creative Nonfiction: The Best of Brevity.

== Bibliography ==
- Aardvark, West Town Press, 2007
- Four Hours to Mpumalanga. Pudding House Publications. 2008. ISBN 978-1-58998-692-3.
- Sagittarius Agitprop, Black Lawrence Press / Dzanc Books, 2009, ISBN 9781934703557
- Barolo. U of Nebraska Press. April 1, 2010. pp. 5–. ISBN 978-0-8032-2830-6.
- Warranty in Zulu, Barrow Street Press, 2010, ISBN 9780981987637
- Pot Farm. U of Nebraska Press. March 1, 2012. ISBN 978-0-8032-4014-8.
- The Morrow Plots, Black Lawrence Press / Dzanc Books, 2013, ISBN 9781937854270
- Preparing the Ghost: An Essay Concerning the Giant Squid and Its First Photographer. Liveright. July 7, 2014. ISBN 978-0-87140-289-9.
- The Mad Feast: An Ecstatic Tour Through America's Food. Liveright. 27 October 2015. ISBN 9781631490736.
