= Donald Morrill =

Donald Morrill (born 1955, Des Moines, Iowa) is an American poet, novelist and non-fiction writer.

== Career and awards ==
His work has appeared in magazines and journals across the country, and in numerous anthologies, garnering several awards, among them the "Lee Smith Novel Prize" (2018) Beaut, the "Florida Book Award (Silver Medal) for Poetry" (2015), the "Anne Halley Prize" from The Massachusetts Review, the "River Teeth Literary Nonfiction Award" from Ashland University, the American Library Association/AAUP Best of the Press Award, the Emerging Writers of Creative Nonfiction Award from Duquesne University Press, the Mid-List Press First Series Award for poetry and The Missouri Review Editors’ Prize for Nonfiction.

He has taught at Jilin University, People's Republic of China, and has been a Fulbright Lecturer at the University of Lodz, Poland. He has also been the Bedell Visiting Writer in the Nonfiction Writing Program at the University of Iowa, and the Tammis Day Writer-in-Residence at the Smith Poetry Center at Smith College.

Currently, he teaches in the Low-Residency MFA Program at the University of Tampa, and is also the Associate Dean of Graduate and Continuing Studies there.

== Books ==
- Beaut, Blair, an Imprint of Carolina Wren Press (2018) ISBN 978-0932112743 (Novel)
- Awaiting Your Impossibilities, Anhinga Press (2015) ISBN 978-1-934695-43-2 (Poetry)
- Impetuous Sleeper, Mid-List Press (2009) ISBN 978-0-922811-78-6 (Nonfiction)
- With Your Back to Half the Day, Anhinga Press (2005) ISBN 0938078860 (Poetry)
- The Untouched Minutes, University of Nebraska Press (2004) ISBN 0-8032-3238-1(Nonfiction)
- Sounding for Cool, Michigan State University Press (2002) ISBN 0-8701-3611-9 (Nonfiction)
- At the Bottom of the Sky, Mid-List Press (1998) ISBN 0-922811-36-9 (Poetry)
- A Stranger's Neighborhood, Duquesne University Press (1998) ISBN 0-8207-0281-1 (Nonfiction)
