= Ron Tanner =

American writer (born 1953)

Ron Tanner (born December 5, 1953, San Diego, California) is writer of fiction and nonfiction and professor emeritus of writing at Loyola University Maryland.

== Life ==
Tanner grew up in North Carolina but also lived in New Jersey and the Marshall Islands. In his twenties he was a professional musician, playing drums in California. He earned a Master of Fine Arts from the Iowa Writers’ Workshop in 1986, where he was recruited to participate in the influential “20 Under 30” anthology, which included Ann Patchett, Lorrie Moore, and David Leavitt. Tanner won a post-graduate James Michener fellowship from the Copernicus Society, then went on to earn a Ph.D. in American Literature from the University of Wisconsin–Milwaukee in 1989, where he was one of four University Fellows.

Tanner joined the writing faculty of Loyola University-Maryland in 1991 and served as writing department chair for four terms. From 2005 to 2010, Tanner served as a board member and a two-term president of the Association of Writers & Writing Programs. Currently, he is professor emeritus of writing at Loyola University-Maryland and lives on an historic farm, where he directs Good Contrivance Farm Writers Retreat, a 501 C-3 nonprofit.

== Writing ==
Tanner's books are the short stories collections Far West (2022) and A Bed of Nails (2003); the novel Missile Paradise (2016); the memoir From Animal House to Our House: A Love Story (2012); a novel, Kiss Me, Stranger (2011); and a chapbook, Wheels (2009). His stories and essays have appeared in The Iowa Review, The Massachusetts Review, Literary Review, Story Quarterly, West Branch, and many others. Tanner has served as contributing editor to Defunct magazine, West Branch, and the Pushcart Press.

Missile Paradise, a novel set in the Marshall Islands, was named a "notable" novel of 2017 by the American Library Association. A starred Kirkus review stated,"The themes here are major—global warming, imperialism, America’s role in the world (the story is set soon after the Abu Ghraib torture and prisoner abuse scandal). But Tanner displays a light touch, favoring snappy dialogue over didacticism. The result is winning." In 2020, Tanner won the Elixir Press book competition for an unpublished manuscript of fiction, Far West, which was published in 2022.

== Awards ==
Tanner's awards include the G.S. Chandra Prize and Towson Prize in Literature for A Bed of Nails, a Pushcart Prize for fiction, Gertrude Press chapbook prize for fiction, First Prize in Fiction from New Letters, the Charles Angoff Prize for fiction, the Jack Dyer Award for Fiction, the Pirate's Alley Faulkner Society Gold Medal for the short story, Best of the Web award, Story South's Million Writers Award, Best of the West award, a Maryland Arts grant (twice), and numerous fellowships, including a James Michener Copernicus Society Fellowship and a Walter Dakin Fellowship (Sewanee Writers' Conference), as well as many residency fellowships (e.g., Ledig House, Yaddo, Millay Colony, and others). In 2014, Tanner was awarded the Nachbahr Award for outstanding achievement in the humanities at Loyola University.

== The Marshall Islands Story Project ==
In 2008, Tanner was awarded a grant by the National Park Service to collect, translate, and preserve the oral stories of Marshallese elders in the Republic of the Marshall Islands. The project set a standard in the Pacific region for teaching students community engagement and communication skills. Translation of the oral stories was completed in 2014 and they are available at www.mistories.org.

== Good Contrivance Farm, Inc. ==
In 2016, Tanner founded Good Contrivance Farm, Inc., as a 501 (c) (3) non-profit dedicated to the preservation and restoration of small historic farms in Maryland. Part of the organization's outreach includes a writer's retreat.
