= Shelley Puhak =

American poet

- Education: University of Delaware; University of New Orleans
- Writing career
- Genres: Poetry, Biography, History
- Website: www.shelleypuhak.com

Shelley Puhak is an American poet and writer. She was Eichner Professor of Creative Writing at Notre Dame of Maryland University. She won the Anthony Hecht Poetry Prize for her poetry collection Guinevere in Baltimore. She was a National Poetry Series winner for her poetry collection Harbinger She is also the author of The Dark Queens: The Bloody Rivalry That Forged the Medieval World, a double biography.

== Life ==
Puhak was born in Washington, D.C. and graduated from University of Delaware with an MA, and from the University of New Orleans with an MFA.

Her work has appeared in Alaska Quarterly Review, Beloit Poetry Journal, Kenyon Review, Missouri Review, Southeast Review, and Superstition Review.

She is married; she and her husband live in Catonsville.

== Works ==
- The Blood Countess: Murder, Betrayal, and the Making of a Monster, Bloomsbury Publishing, 2026, ISBN 9781639732159
- The Dark Queens: The Bloody Rivalry That Forged the Medieval World, Bloomsbury Publishing, 2022, ISBN 9781635574913
- Guinevere in Baltimore, Waywiser Press, 2014, ISBN 9781904130574
- Stalin in Aruba, Black Lawrence Press, 2010, ISBN 9780615319308
- Harbinger. New York: Ecco. October 2022. ISBN 9780063233966.
