= Debra Marquart =

American poet

- Born: 1956; Napoleon, North Dakota
- Education: Master of Liberal Arts, Moorhead State University (1990); M.A. Creative Writing, Iowa State University (1993)
- Occupations: Poet, singer-songwriter
- Writing career
- Language: English
- Website: debramarquart.com

Debra Marquart is an American poet and musician from the small town of Napoleon, North Dakota. Since 1992 she has been performing as singer-songwriter with the band The Bone People. After graduating with master's degrees from Moorhead State University and Iowa State University (ISU), she became an English professor at ISU, directing an MFA program in "creative writing and environment". In 2014, she taught writers' workshops in Bakken oil field communities most affected by hydraulic fracking, where "many people ... are despairing – feeling that they have been declared an energy sacrifice zone." She is the Poet Laureate of Iowa since 2019. In 2021 she received an Academy of American Poets Laureate Fellowship.

== Early life ==
Marquart grew up on a farm originally purchased by her great-grandfather in the small town of Napoleon, North Dakota. She was the youngest of five children. Though her father relocated the family to Bismarck at one point, none of his brothers was willing to run the farm, so they returned. Marquart loathed the place, the hard physical labor, and the limited prospects for women, and was eager to leave.

== Career ==
After finishing high school, she toured with rock and heavy metal bands throughout the 1980s. At the end of the decade she studied at Moorhead State University, Minnesota, graduating with a Master of Liberal Arts in 1990. In 1991 she moved to Iowa, enrolling at Iowa State University (ISU) in Ames and earned a Master of Arts in Creative Writing in 1993 with a thesis entitled "The Horizontal Life: Poems, Stories, Essays". She became an English professor at ISU and has been directing the MFA program in 'creative writing and environment'.

In November 2013, the North Dakota Humanities Council invited her to a "traveling residency to gather cultural and environmental impact stories in the North Dakota Oil Patch". She taught writers' workshops in Bakken communities most affected by hydraulic fracking.

She has developed concerns about the environmental impact of hydraulic fracturing, the 3900 oil spills in North Dakota since the oil boom, and water quality. She is also concerned about the ICBMs still planted in the fracking zone. In a 2016 Iowa Public Radio interview, she read the poem "Lament" from "Small buried things". She has said:

There are some good things about the oil boom, but we must realize that many people in the state are despairing – feeling that they have been declared an energy sacrifice zone and the rest of the country doesn't care what their land and water will be like. I love the place, so I must speak up for it.

== Work ==
She has published six books, which includes three poetry collections, a book of short stories, and a memoir.

- Small Buried Things (American Poetry). Minneapolis, MN: New Rivers Press. 2015. p. 104. ISBN 978-0898233087.
- The Horizontal World: Growing Up Wild in the Middle of Nowhere. Counterpoint Books. 2006. pp. 304. ISBN 1582433631.
- From Sweetness. Long Beach: Pearl editions. 2002. p. 96. ISBN 188821919X.
- The Hunger Bone: Rock & Roll Stories. Minneapolis, MN: New Rivers Press. 2001. pp. 85. ASIN B00I3C8B94.
- Everything's a Verb. Minneapolis, MN: New Rivers Press. 1995. p. 85. ISBN 0898231620.

She has edited several other books including the 2016 anthology Nothing to Declare: A Guide to the Flash Sequence.

She is a singer-songwriter with the band The Bone People, a jazz-poetry rhythm & blues project with Anthony Stevens and Peter Manesis, and released the CDs Orange Parade (acoustic rock) and A Regular Dervish (jazz-poetry).

== Awards ==
She has received the following awards:

- John Guyon Nonfiction Award
- 2001 Pushcart Prize
- 2003 Mid-American Review Nonfiction Award
- The Headwater's Prize
- 2003 Shelby Foote Prize for the Essay from the Faulkner Society
- 2007 PEN Center USA Creative Nonfiction Award
- 2008 NEA Creative Writing Prose Fellowship
- 2014 Paumanok Poetry Award from the Visiting Writers Program, Farmingdale State College, New York.
