= Ruthann Robson =

American professor of law and author

- Born: 1956 (age 69–70)
- Occupation: Non-fiction writer

Academic background
- Education: Kalamazoo College Stetson University College of Law

Academic work
- Discipline: Law
- Sub-discipline: Constitutional law; family law; feminist legal theory
- Institutions: City University of New York

Ruthann Robson is a writer and was an American professor of law at CUNY School of Law in New York City. She has written on legal scholarship and theory and published fiction, poetry, and creative nonfiction. Her novel Eye of a Hurricane was a finalist for the Lambda Literary Award for LGBT Debut Fiction.

== Career ==
She taught at the City University of New York School of Law from 1990 to 2022, in the areas of constitutional law, family law, feminist legal theory, and sexuality and the law. The New York City Law Review published a symposium on her work in volume 8, issue 2.

In 2007, the CUNY board of Trustees designated Professor Ruthann Robson a University Distinguished Professor. A profile by Jill Jarvis is featured on the CUNY website. A profile by Emily Sachar is featured in CUNY Law, the law school magazine.

== Publications ==
- Sappho Goes to Law School
- Masks
- Lesbian (Out)Law: Survival Under the Rule of Law
- a/k/a
- The Struggle for Happiness (both from St. Martin's Press)
- Cecile
- Eye of a Hurricane
- re*view (ri*vyōō')

== Awards and fellowships ==
- Ferro-Grumley Award for LGBT Fiction for Eye of a Hurricane
- Fellow in Nonfiction Literature, New York Foundation for the Arts
- Bram Fischer Research Chair, Witwatersrand (WITS) Law School, Johannesburg, South Africa
- Collaborative Research Fellowship, University of Sydney
- Djerassi Artists Fellowship Residency
- CALI (Center for Computer-Assisted Legal Instruction) Law Fellowship
