= Jeff Oaks =

American poet and essayist (1964–2023)

Jeff Oaks (June 6, 1964 – December 20, 2023) was an American poet and essayist who was a senior lecturer at the University of Pittsburgh, and the assistant director of the writing program.

== Background ==
Born on June 6, 1964, Oaks was raised in the Finger Lakes region of Upstate New York. According to Oaks, he started writing around age 17. Always fascinated by insects, Oaks originally planned to study entomology in college. However, he soon became bored with his science classes and turned his focus to creative writing. Oaks graduated from Binghamton University with a bachelor's degree in English Literature.

Oaks received a graduate degree in poetry at the University of Montana and his Master of Fine Arts degree in poetry at the University of Pittsburgh in 1990.

Oaks was a longtime resident of Pittsburgh.

== Teaching ==
Oaks taught at the University of Pittsburgh, first as a teaching assistant, then as part-time faculty, then as a full-time, non-tenure-stream lecturer. From 1999 to 2011, he managed the Pittsburgh Contemporary Writers Series, bringing from six to 13 well-known writers each year to campus for free readings and talks.

In 2011, Oaks was promoted to senior lecturer and became the assistant director of the University of Pittsburgh writing program. He specialized in teaching creative writing, but he also taught in the composition and literature programs.

For many years, Oaks worked as a writer-in-residence for the Western Pennsylvania Writing Project, based in the School of Education, University of Pittsburgh. He partnered with local secondary school teachers in summer workshops as well as inventing stand-alone visits to local schools. Oaks taught writing classes at the State Correctional Institution – Pittsburgh, The Ellis School in Pittsburgh, the Carnegie Museum School and the Carnegie Library.

In 2008, Oaks received the Tina and David Bellet Arts and Sciences Teaching Excellence Award for his university teaching.

== Works ==
=== Writing ===
Oaks was the author of four poetry chapbooks, including Mistakes with Strangers, Shift, The Moon of Books and The Unknown Country. He was also a recipient of three Pennsylvania Council on the Arts fellowships and has published poems in Assaracus, Field, Bloom, Mid-American Review, Zócalo Public Square, and Superstition Review. Oaks' poem Saint Wrench was selected for Best New Poets 2012 by poet Matthew Dickman.

He had two full-length poetry books published: Little What, in 2019, and The Things, in 2022.

Oaks' essays appeared in At Length, Kenyon Review Online, and in the anthologies Brief Encounters: A Collection of Contemporary Nonfiction and My Diva: 65 Gay Men on the Women Who Inspire Them. In 1999, Oaks was nominated for the Pushcart Prize.

=== Art ===
In the last several years of his life, Oaks explored visual art, particularly painting, and had several local exhibitions of his work.

== Death ==
After a long illness, Oaks died on December 20, 2023, aged 59.

== Books ==
- The Unknown Country, poetry (Brockport, New York: State Street Press, 1994).
- The Moon of Books, poetry (Lincoln, Nebraska: Ultima Obscura Press, 2000).
- Shift, poetry (Lewisburg, Pennsylvania: Seven Kitchens Press, 2010).
- Mistakes with Strangers, poetry (Lewisburg, PA: Seven Kitchens Press, 2014)
- Little What, poetry (Lily Poetry Review, 2019)
- The Things, poetry (Lily Poetry Review, 2022)

== Sources ==
- Contemporary Authors Online. The Gale Group, 2007.
