= Linda Peeno =

American physician

- Born: 1949 or 1950 (age 76–77)
- Education: University of Louisville School of Medicine (MD)

Linda Peeno is an American physician, ethicist, and lecturer known for being a whistleblower against the American managed healthcare industry. As of 2007, she practices medicine in Louisville, Kentucky.

== Early life and education ==
Peeno is a native of Hodgenville, Kentucky. She received a medical degree from the University of Louisville School of Medicine, where she specialized in internal medicine and infectious diseases.

== Whistleblowing ==
Following employment as a medical reviewer for Humana and medical director at Blue Cross/Blue Shield Health Plans, she became a critic of how U.S. HMOs drive profits through denial of care.

On May 30, 1996, Peeno testified before Congress as to the downside of managed care.

I wish to begin by making a public confession: In the spring of 1987, as a physician, I caused the death of a man. Although this was known to many people, I have not been taken before any court of law or called to account for this in any professional or public forum. In fact, just the opposite occurred: I was "rewarded" for this. It bought me an improved reputation in my job, and contributed to my advancement afterwards. Not only did I demonstrate I could indeed do what was expected of me, I exemplified the "good" company doctor: I saved a half million dollars.

I contend that "managed care," as we currently know it, is inherently unethical in its organization and operation. Furthermore, I maintain that we have an industry which can exist only through flagrant ethical violations against individuals and the public.

== Media representation and controversy ==
In the 2002 Showtime docudrama Damaged Care, Laura Dern portrayed Peeno as she transitioned from health care industry employee to whistleblower. In 2007, Peeno was prominently featured in the Michael Moore movie Sicko, which included portions of her May 1996 appearance before Congress.

On June 28, 2007, in a statement about Sicko, Humana declared that Peeno was never a Humana "associate" (permanent, full-time employee), but rather a "part-time contractor". Humana also disputed the portions of Congressional testimony that were shown by saying that because the patient's specific healthcare plan didn't cover heart transplants, the denial of coverage was valid.
