= Laurie Graham (novelist) =

Laurie Graham (born 25 November 1947) is an English journalist, radio scriptwriter and novelist. She lives in London.

== Career ==
Graham was born in Leicester. She is an occasional contributor to The Spectator. She wrote a weekly column for The Daily Telegraph and the Sunday Telegraph newspapers from 1987 to 1991. She was also Contributing Editor to She magazine and Cosmopolitan. She has written twenty two novels and several volumes of non-fiction. Graham is published by Quercus in the United Kingdom.

== Bibliography ==
=== Fiction ===
- The Importance of Being Kennedy (2007) ISBN 978-0-00-722884-3
- Gone With The Windsors (2005) ISBN 0-00-714675-2
- Mr Starlight (2004) ISBN 0-00-714673-6
- The Unfortunates (2002) ISBN 1-84115-314-1 published in the US as The Great Husband Hunt ISBN 0-446-69132-1
- The Future Homemakers of America (2001) ISBN 1-84115-312-5
- Dog Days, Glenn Miller Nights (2000) ISBN 0-552-99759-5
- The Dress Circle (1998) ISBN 0-552-99760-9
- Perfect Meringues (1997) ISBN 0-552-99657-2
- The Ten O’Clock Horses (1996) ISBN 0-552-99656-4
- The Man for the Job (1986) ISBN 0-7011-3981-1
- Life according to Lubka (2010) ISBN 1-84916-182-8
- At Sea (2010) ISBN 1-84916-218-2 (1 July 2010)
- A Humble Companion (2012) ISBN 1-78087-548-7
- The Liar's Daughter (2013) ISBN 978-0-85738784-4
- The Grand Duchess of Nowhere (2014) ISBN 978-1-78206-970-6
- The Night in Question (2015) ISBN 978-1-78206-974-4
- The Early Birds (2017) ISBN 978-1-78429-792-3
- Anyone for Seconds? (2019) ISBN 978-1-78429-798-5
- Dr Dan's Casebook (2019) ISBN 978-1-08034-225-9
- Dr Dan, Married Man (2020) ISBN 978-1-65908-956-1
- Dr Dan Moves On (2020) ISBN 979-8-68903-478-2
- Dr Dan, Dr Dad (2021) ISBN 979-8-46280-096-2

=== Non-Fiction ===
- Teenagers: A Family Survival Guide (1992) ISBN 0-7011-3842-4
- Getting It Right: A Survival Guide to Modern Manners (1989) ISBN 0-7011-3452-6
- A Marriage Survival Guide (1988) ISBN 0-7011-3399-6
- A Parents’ Survival Guide (1986) ISBN 0-7011-3129-2
