= Sheryl St. Germain =

American poet, essayist, and professor (born 1954)

- Born: 1954 (age 71–72); New Orleans, Louisiana
- Occupations: Poet; essayist; professor
- Parent: Jules St. Francois St. Germain Myrl Marie Frank

Sheryl St. Germain (born 1954 in New Orleans, Louisiana) is an American poet, essayist, and professor.

She is of Cajun and Creole descent. Her father was Jules St. Francois St. Germain and her mother Myrl Marie Frank. Born and raised in south Louisiana, much of her work deals with the culture and environment of Louisiana. She directs the Master of Fine Arts in Creative Writing Program at Chatham University in Pittsburgh, Pennsylvania. She has also taught at the University of Louisiana, Lafayette, 1991–94; Knox College, 1994–98; and Iowa State University, 1998-2005.

She studied at Southeastern Louisiana University (B.A.) and University of Texas at Dallas, (M.A. and Ph.D.).

St. German's father, brother, and son died of substance abuse, and St. Germain has written both essays and poems that address substance abuse. She co-founded Words Without Walls, Words, a creative partnership between the Chatham MFA Creative Writing Program, Allegheny County Jail (ACJ), and Sojourner House, a residential drug and alcohol treatment facility for mothers and their children.

== Books ==
- Words Without Walls: Writers on Addiction, Violence and Incarceration, co-editor with Sarah Shotland (San Antonio: Trinity University Press), 2015
- Navigating Disaster: Sixteen Poems of Love and a Song of Despair (Lafayette: Louisiana Literature Press), 2012
- Between Song and Story: Essays for the Twenty-first Century, co-editor with Margaret Whitford, essays (Pittsburgh: Autumn House Press, 2011)
- Let It Be a Dark Roux: New and Selected Poems, poetry (Pittsburgh: Autumn House Press, 2007)
- Swamp Songs: The Making of an Unruly Woman, essays (Salt Lake City: University of Utah Press, 2003)
- The Journals of Scheherazade, poetry (Denton: University of North Texas Press, 1996)
- How Heavy the Breath of God, poetry (Denton: University of North Texas Press, 1994)
- Making Bread at Midnight, poetry (Austin: Slough, 1992)
- Going Home, poetry (Van Nuys: Perivale, 1989)
- The Mask of Medusa, poetry (New York: Cross Cultural Press, 1987)

== Sources ==
- Contemporary Authors Online. The Gale Group, 2006. PEN (Permanent Entry Number): 0000135971.
- Author website: https://sheryl-stgermain.com/
- Poetry Foundation: https://www.poetryfoundation.org/poems-and-poets/poets/detail/sheryl-st-germain
- Words Without Walls: http://www.wordswithoutwalls.com/
