= Meredith Hall =

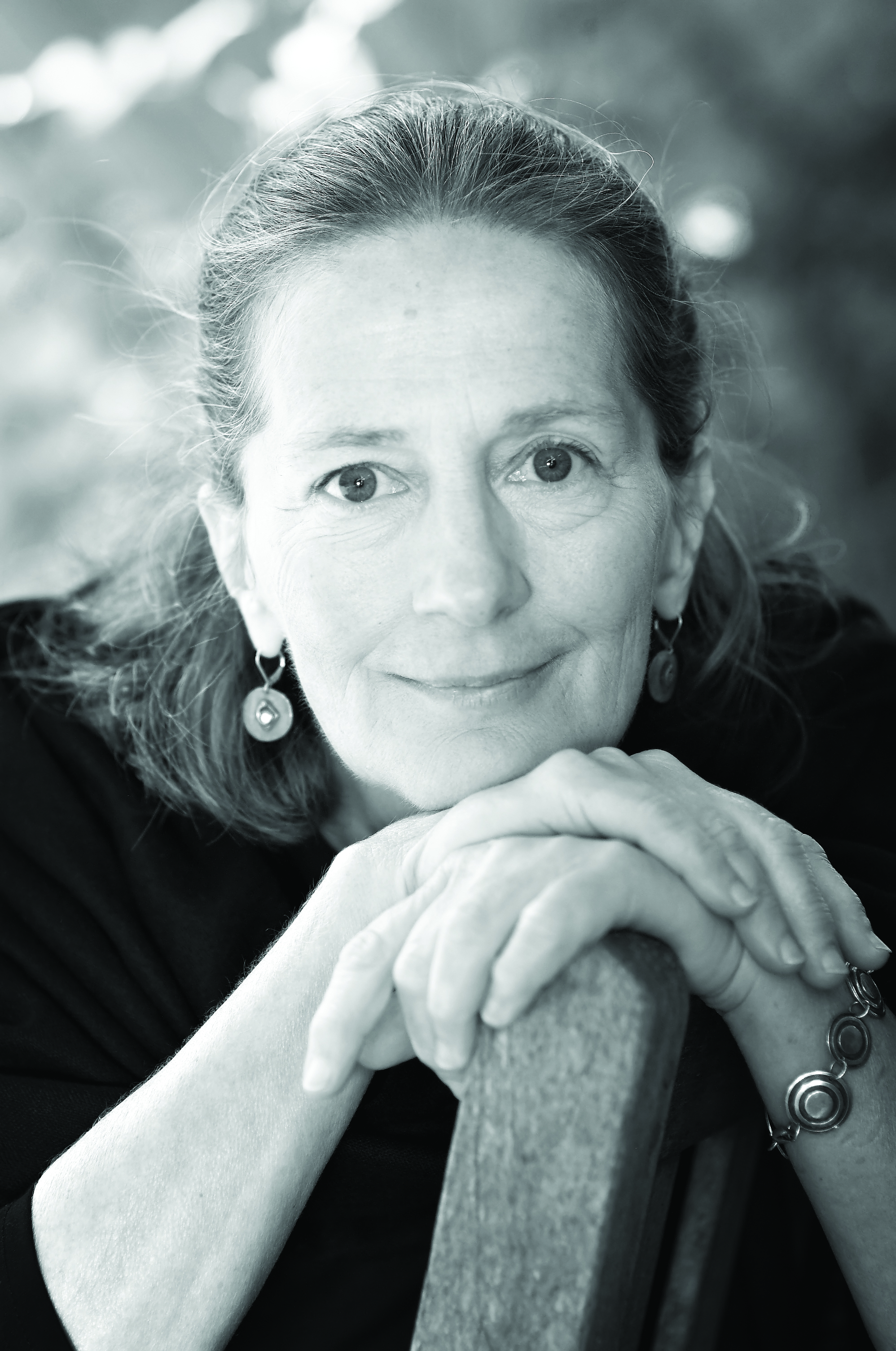
Meredith Hall

Meredith Hall (born March 25, 1949) is a writer and professor emeritus at the University of New Hampshire. She is the author of the memoir Without a Map and the novel Beneficence.

== Background ==
At 44, Hall graduated from Bowdoin College and began writing. Since then, her essays have appeared in The New York Times, Creative Nonfiction, The Southern Review, Five Points, Prairie Schooner, Shunned, Killing Chickens as well as several anthologies. She has received the Pushcart Prize and “notable essay” recognition in Best American Essays.

In 2004, Hall won a US$50,000 Gift of Freedom Award from A Room of Her Own Foundation, which gave her the time and financial security to write the memoir Without a Map (Beacon Press 2007).

In 2020, publisher Godine released Hall's debut novel, Beneficence. The novel traces several decades in the Senter family's lives on their Maine dairy farm as they move from grace to tragedy, then struggle towards redemption. In advance of the release of Beneficence, Richard Russo wrote "If the word ‘luminous’ didn’t already exist, you’d have to invent it to describe Meredith Hall’s radiant new novel." Dani Shapiro wrote "This fiercely beautiful novel took hold of me from the very first page. Beneficence is at once a page-turner and an artistic triumph." And Richard Ford wrote that the novel "instructs us to savor life, to set aside our cold spirit, to notice human beings closely and tenderly, and to believe that telling life plainly is a virtue which can achieve beauty.” Publishers Weekly calls Beneficence "powerful," writing, "Hall’s meticulous prose convincingly captures the daily realities—sometimes beautiful, sometimes cruel—of agricultural life, and offers insight into the ways calamity fractures family bonds…readers will be rewarded.”

== Awards ==
- Gift of Freedom Award (A Room of Her Own Foundation)
- Pushcart Prize
- Best American Essays (Notable Essay)

== Selected works ==
- Without a Map (Beacon Press, 2007)
- Beneficence (David R. Godine, Publisher, 2020)
