= Passages North =

American literary magazine

- Editor: Jennifer A. Howard
- Categories: Literary magazine
- Frequency: Annual
- Publisher: Northern Michigan University
- Founded: 1979
- Country: United States
- Language: English
- Website: http://passagesnorth.com
- ISSN: 0278-0828

Passages North is an American literary magazine published by Northern Michigan University. Essays that have appeared in Passages North have been recognized in the anthology, The Best American Essays, on numerous occasions. The magazine was established in 1979. It sponsors the Waasmode Short Fiction Prize, the Elinor Benedict Poetry Prize, the Neutrino Short-Short Prize, and the Ray Ventre Memorial Nonfiction Prize.

Passages North submissions are read by a team of English department faculty, graduate students, undergraduate interns, and, occasionally, alumni of NMU's graduate writing programs. The Editor-in-Chief is Jennifer A. Howard, who also serves as the Short-Short editor. Dacia Price currently serves as the Managing Editor. Other Editors include Lisandra Perez in Poetry, Esperanza Elizabeth Vargas Macias in Fiction, and Matthew Gavin Frank in Non-Fiction/Hybrids.

Passages North publishes one print issue annually. They also regularly publish pieces on their website throughout their submissions windows.

== Notable contributors ==
Notable contributors are:

- Gina Ochsner
- Aimee Nezhukumatathil
- Ander Monson
- Ocean Vuong
- Roxane Gay
- Sarah Minor
- Maggie Smith (poet)
- Bob Hicok
- Mary Ruefle
- Jenny Boully
- Carolyn Kreiter-Foronda
