= The Immortal Life of Henrietta Lacks (film) =

2017 American television film

- Film poster
- Genre: Drama
- Based on: The Immortal Life of Henrietta Lacks by Rebecca Skloot
- Screenplay by: Peter Landesman; Alexander Woo; George C. Wolfe
- Directed by: George C. Wolfe
- Starring: Oprah Winfrey; Rose Byrne; Renée Elise Goldsberry; Courtney B. Vance; Reg E. Cathey; Ruben Santiago-Hudson; Leslie Uggams
- Music by: Branford Marsalis
- Country of origin: United States
- Original language: English

Production
- Executive producers: Alan Ball; Carla Gardini; Peter Macdissi; Lydia Dean Pilcher; Oprah Winfrey
- Producer: Kathryn Dean
- Cinematography: Sofian El Fani
- Editor: Aaron Yanes
- Running time: 92 minutes
- Production companies: Your Face Goes Here Entertainment; Harpo Films; Cine Mosaic

Original release
- Network: HBO
- Release: April 22, 2017

The Immortal Life of Henrietta Lacks is a 2017 American drama television film directed by George C. Wolfe and starring Oprah Winfrey and Rose Byrne. It is based on the book of the same name by Rebecca Skloot and documents the story of Henrietta Lacks, who was diagnosed with cervical cancer in the 1950s, and whose cancer cells (later known as HeLa) would change the course of cancer treatment.

The film premiered on HBO on April 22, 2017.

== Background ==
In January 1951, Henrietta Lacks suffered complications while giving birth. A biopsy taken in February confirmed that she had cervical cancer. Lacks died in October, having never been told that cells from her tumor were being used for research; not sharing this information was common practice in the United States at the time. Cell biologist George Otto Gey found that the cells could be kept alive, and developed into what is – at the time of writing – the oldest immortalised cell line and one of the most commonly used in medical (not just cancer) research; previously, cells cultured from other human cells would survive for only a few days, but cells from Lacks' tumor behaved differently.

== Cast ==
- Oprah Winfrey as Deborah Lacks
- Rose Byrne as Rebecca Skloot
- Renée Elise Goldsberry as Henrietta Lacks
- Courtney B. Vance as Sir Lord Keenan Kester Cofield
- Reg E. Cathey as Zakariyya Lacks
- Ruben Santiago-Hudson as Dr. Roland Pattillo
- Leslie Uggams as Sadie
- Reed Birney as Dr. George Gey
- John Douglas Thompson as Lawrence Lacks
- Adriane Lenox as Barbra Lacks
- Roger Robinson as Day Lacks
- Rocky Carroll as Sonny Lacks
- Kyanna Simone Simpson as Teenage Deborah Lacks
- Tian Richards as Young Lawrence Lacks

== Production ==
The film was announced on May 2, 2016, with Alan Ball and Oprah Winfrey as executive producers. George C. Wolfe would direct the film, with Winfrey taking the role of Lacks' daughter Deborah. In July, Rose Byrne was cast as Rebecca Skloot, the author of the book about Henrietta, who befriends Deborah while reporting on her mother's life, and Renée Elise Goldsberry was cast as the titular Henrietta Lacks. The core supporting cast was rounded out in August 2016, with Courtney B. Vance, Ruben Santiago-Hudson, Reg E. Cathey and Leslie Uggams amongst them. After several weeks of shooting in Atlanta, The Immortal Life of Henrietta Lacks began filming in Baltimore in September 2016. Two of Henrietta Lacks's sons, Zakariyya and Sonny, were consultants on the film.

== Reception ==
=== Critical reception ===
The Immortal Life of Henrietta Lacks received mixed to positive reviews from critics, with Winfrey's performance gaining high praise. The review aggregator website Rotten Tomatoes gave the film an approval rating of 69%, based on 35 reviews, with an average rating of 6.5/10. On Metacritic the film has a score of 64 out of 100, based on 22 critics, indicating "generally favorable reviews".

=== Accolades ===
Year	Award	Category	Nominee(s)	Result	Ref.
2017	Black Reel Awards for Television	Outstanding Television Movie or Limited Series		Nominated	
2017	Black Reel Awards for Television	Outstanding Actress, TV Movie or Limited Series	Oprah Winfrey	Nominated	
2017	Black Reel Awards for Television	Outstanding Supporting Actor, TV Movie or Limited Series	Reg E. Cathey	Nominated	
2017	Black Reel Awards for Television	Outstanding Directing, TV Movie/Limited Series	George C. Wolfe	Nominated	
2017	Black Reel Awards for Television	Outstanding Writing, TV Movie/Limited Series	George C. Wolfe	Won	
2017	Online Film & Television Association Awards	Best Motion Picture		Nominated	
2017	Online Film & Television Association Awards	Best Actress in a Motion Picture or Limited Series	Oprah Winfrey	Nominated	
2017	Primetime Emmy Awards	Outstanding Television Movie	Oprah Winfrey, Carla Gardini, Alan Ball, Peter Macdissi, Lydia Dean Pilcher, Rebecca Skloot, and Kathryn Dean	Nominated	
2018	Artios Awards	Outstanding Achievement in Casting – Film – Non-Theatrical Release	Cindy Tolan, Meagan Lewis, and Daniel Cabeza	Nominated	
2018	Critics' Choice Television Awards	Best Movie Made for Television		Nominated	
2018	Directors Guild of America Awards	Outstanding Directorial Achievement in Movies for Television and Miniseries	George C. Wolfe	Nominated	
2018	Gracie Awards	Made for TV Movie		Won	
2018	NAACP Image Awards	Outstanding Television Movie, Limited-Series or Dramatic Special		Nominated	
2018	NAACP Image Awards	Outstanding Actress in a Television Movie, Limited-Series or Dramatic Special	Oprah Winfrey	Nominated	
2018	NAACP Image Awards	Outstanding Writing in a Television Movie or Special	Peter Landesman, Alexander Woo, and George C. Wolfe	Nominated	
2018	NAMIC Vision Awards	Original Movie or Special		Won	
2018	NAMIC Vision Awards	Best Performance – Drama	Oprah Winfrey	Won	
2018	Satellite Awards	Best Motion Picture Made for Television		Nominated	
2018	USC Scripter Awards	Television	Peter Landesman, Alexander Woo, and George C. Wolfe (screenwriters); Rebecca Skloot (author)	Nominated	
2018	Writers Guild of America Awards	Long Form – Adapted	Peter Landesman, Alexander Woo, and George C. Wolfe; Based on the book by Rebecca Skloot	Nominated	
