= Gartler =

Gartler is a surname. Notable people with the surname include:

- Paul Gartler (born 1997), Austrian footballer
- René Gartler (born 1985), Austrian footballer and coach
- Stanley Michael Gartler (1923–2026), American cell and molecular biologist and human geneticist
