= Statue of Henrietta Lacks (Roanoke, Virginia) =

- Subject: Henrietta Lacks
- Location: Roanoke, Virginia, U.S.; 37°16′13.9″N 79°56′42.8″W

A statue of Henrietta Lacks was installed in Roanoke, Virginia, in 2024. The artwork was designed by Bryce Cobbs and completed by Lawrence Bechtel.
