= Statue of Henrietta Lacks =

Statue in Bristol, England

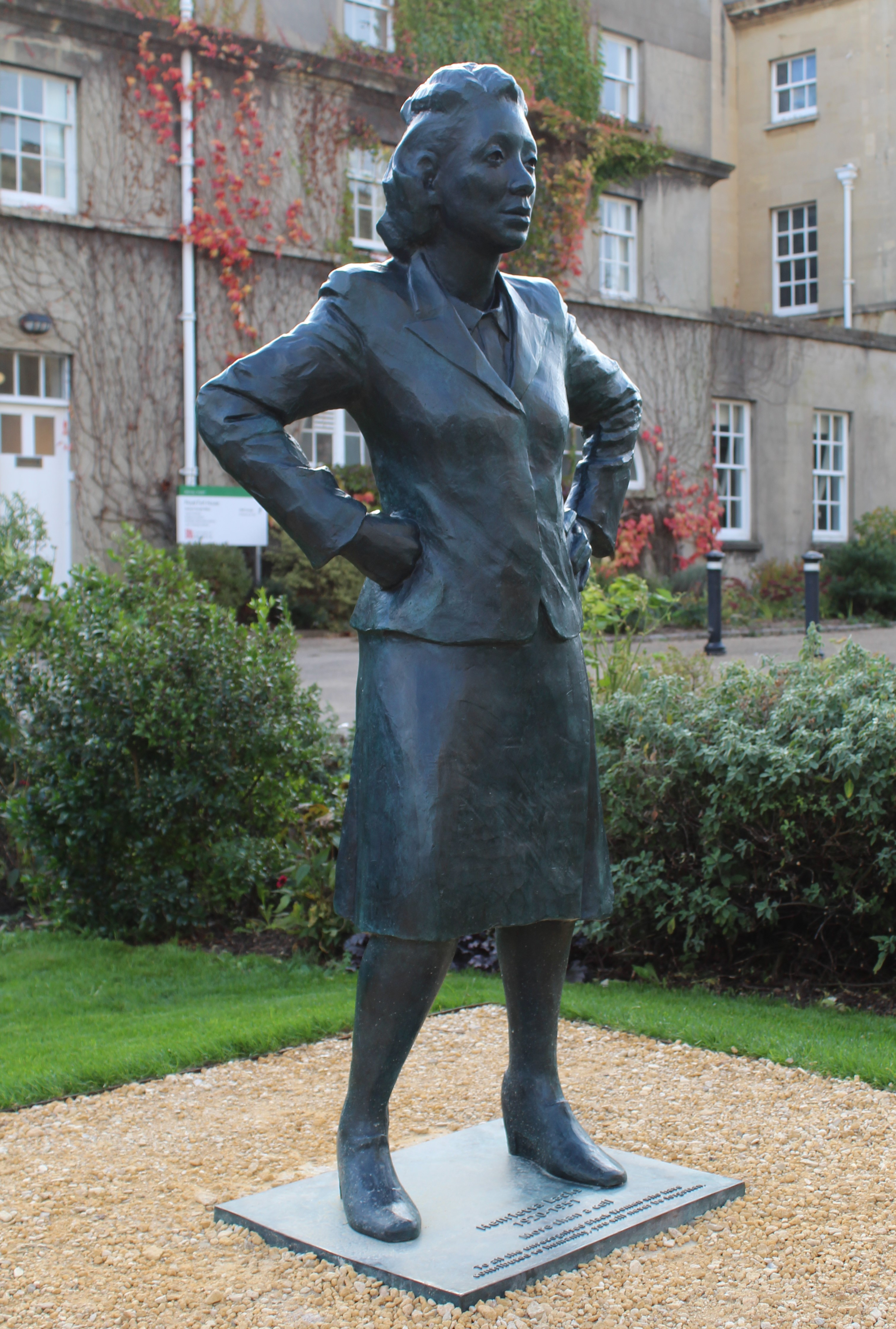
- The statue in 2021
- Subject: Henrietta Lacks
- Location: Bristol, United Kingdom; 51.458085°N 2.601562°W

A statue of Henrietta Lacks was unveiled in Bristol in October 2021. According to The Guardian, the sculpture by Helen Wilson-Roe is "the first statue of a black woman created by a black woman for a public space" in the United Kingdom.

== Background ==
Henrietta Lacks was an African-American woman whose cancer cells are the source of the HeLa cell line, the first immortalized human cell line. The HeLa cell line continues to be a source of invaluable medical data and research. Helen Wilson-Roe had spent over 20 years researching Henrietta Lacks' story and the commission arose after Wilson-Roe had created portraits of Lacks and Bristol's first woman black mayor Cleo Lake. The sculpture was completed in 2021 and unveiled by Henrietta Lacks family.
