= Roland Pattillo =

American physician

Roland A. Pattillo (June 12, 1933 – May 3, 2023) was an American medical doctor and researcher, who was noted for his involvement with the HeLa line of cells and his connection to the family of Henrietta Lacks, from whom the cells were cultured.

== Biography ==
Pattillo grew up in the 1930s in a segregated Louisiana town, the son of a blacksmith turned railroad worker. He graduated from Xavier University of Louisiana with a bachelor's degree, and received a scholarship to attend medical school at Saint Louis University, where he studied under Edward Adelbert Doisy and George Gey. He died on May 3, 2023, at the age of 89.

== Career ==
Pattillo's career and research were driven by his experience of Henrietta Lacks' suffering. After her death, he purchased the headstone for her grave, and became close to her family, serving as an intermediary between them and the many researchers and journalists who wished to contact them.

Pattillo became a practicing physician and professor of gynecology for the Medical College of Wisconsin. He later took over Gey's reproductive tract cell bank, moving it from Johns Hopkins to Morehouse School of Medicine. Pattillo served as the interim chair of the OB/GYN department at Morehouse from 1996 to 1998, and began hosting a women's health conference there in honor of the Lacks family (the HeLa Conference).

Pattillo has authored more than 100 peer-reviewed journal articles and book chapters, and one book. His research and clinical studies focused on in-vitro cell models that possessed characteristic biomarkers that were then used in multiple experimental designs for assessment of endocrine function, chemotherapy, radiation therapy sensitivity, and differentiation. This research culminated in the first identification of the trophoblast stem cell and the first human hormone synthesizing cell system which scientists worldwide were able to use for new treatment for ovarian cancer.

Pattillo retired from his position at Morehouse in 2013, after a career of 20 years at that school.

== Awards ==
Over the course of his career, Pattillo has received several awards and recognitions:

- 2003: Medallion of the International Trophoblast Society
- Leonard Tow Humanism in Medicine Award
- Pioneer Award from the National Institute of Health for Frontiers in Stem Cell research
- 2009: St. Louis University Diversity Award – Keynote Speaker
- 2009: St. Louis University School of Medicine Merit Award
- 2009: America's Top Doctor's List, Atlanta Magazine

== Legacy ==
In the 2017 movie, The Immortal Life of Henrietta Lacks, he was played by Ruben Santiago-Hudson.
