= Small nucleolar RNA SNORA49 =

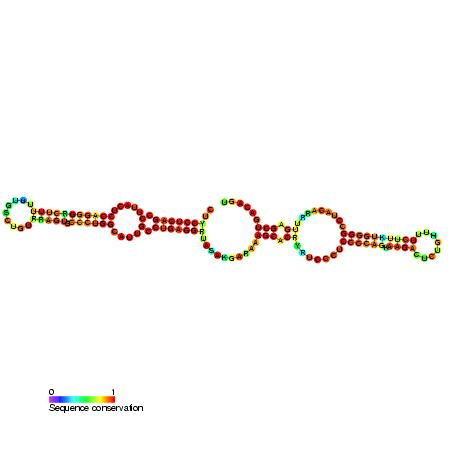
- Predicted secondary structure and sequence conservation of SNORA49

Identifiers
- Symbol: SNORA49
- Alt. Symbols: snoACA49
- Rfam: RF00562

Other data
- RNA type: Gene; snRNA; snoRNA; HACA-box
- Domain: Eukaryota
- GO: GO:0006396 GO:0005730
- SO: SO:0000594
- PDB structures: PDBe

In molecular biology, Small nucleolar RNA ACA49 is a snoRNA, originally cloned in 2004 from a HeLa cell extract immunoprecipitated with an anti-GAR1 antibody. It has no identified target RNA.
