= Michael A. Rogers =

Michael Rogers
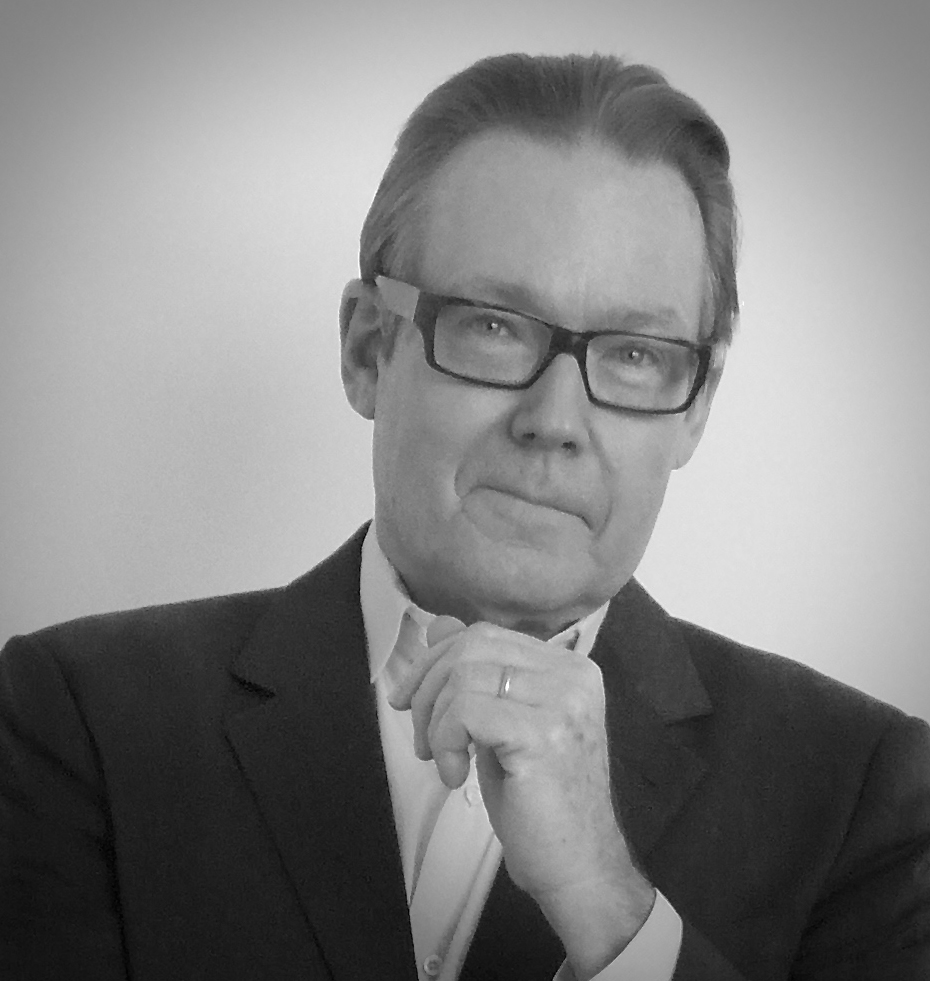
- Credit: Donna Rini
- Occupations: Author and futurist

Michael A. Rogers is a novelist, journalist and futurist, who also served as futurist-in-residence for The New York Times. He has worked with companies including FedEx, Boeing, NBC Universal, Prudential, Dow Corning, American Express, and Microsoft.

== Biography ==
Rogers was born in California and graduated from Stanford University in 1972 with a bachelor's degree in creative writing and minor in physics, with additional training in finance and management at Stanford Business School’s Executive Program.

== Media and technology career ==
For ten years Rogers was vice president of The Washington Post Company's new media division, overseeing both the newspaper and its sister publication Newsweek, as well as serving as editor and general manager of Newsweek.com. From 2006 to 2008 he was futurist-in-residence for The New York Times Company.

He began his career as a writer for Rolling Stone, where he covered the historic Asilomar Conference on Recombinant DNA in 1974. In 1976, his investigative article was the first to publicly identify Henrietta Lacks, whose cells were a crucial tool for medical research.

While at Rolling Stone, he co-founded Outside Magazine. He then launched Newsweek's technology column, winning numerous journalism awards, including a National Headliner Award for coverage of the Chernobyl disaster and a Distinguished Online Service award from the National Press Club for coverage of 9/11.

Rogers began working with interactive media in 1986, when he developed the storyline for Ballblazer, the first Lucasfilm computer game. In 1993 he produced the world's first CD-ROM news magazine for Newsweek and in 1995 he created an interactive CD-ROM/book combination The Parent's Guide to Children's Software. He went on to develop areas on Prodigy, America Online, and then a series of Internet news sites. In 1999 he received a patent for the bimodal spine, a multimedia storytelling technique, and was subsequently listed in Who’s Who in Science and Engineering. In 2007 he was named to the Magazine Industry Digital Hall of Fame, and in 2009 he received the World Technology Network Award for Achievement in Media and Journalism.

== Publications ==
=== Books ===
- Mindfogger (Novel; Knopf, 1973) ISBN 978-0-394-48401-3
- Do Not Worry About the Bear (Short stories; Knopf, 1977) ISBN 978-0-394-50191-8
- Biohazard (Nonfiction; Knopf, 1979) ISBN 978-0-394-40128-7
- Silicon Valley (Novel; Simon & Schuster, 1983) ISBN 978-0-671-41030-8
- Forbidden Sequence (Novel; Bantam, 1989) ISBN 978-0-553-27080-8
- Email from the Future: Notes from 2084 (Novel; PF, 2022) ISBN 978-0-578-35537-5

== Honors and awards ==
- 1974: American Association for the Advancement of Science Distinguished Science Writing
- 1987: National Headliner Award for coverage of Chernobyl meltdown
- 2003: National Press Club Award for Distinguished Contribution to Online Journalism, for coverage of 9-11 on newsweek.com
- 2007: Magazine Industry Digital Hall of Fame Inductee
- 2009: World Technology Network Award for Achievement in Media and Journalism
