= Stanley Michael Gartler =

American cell and molecular biologist (1923–2026)

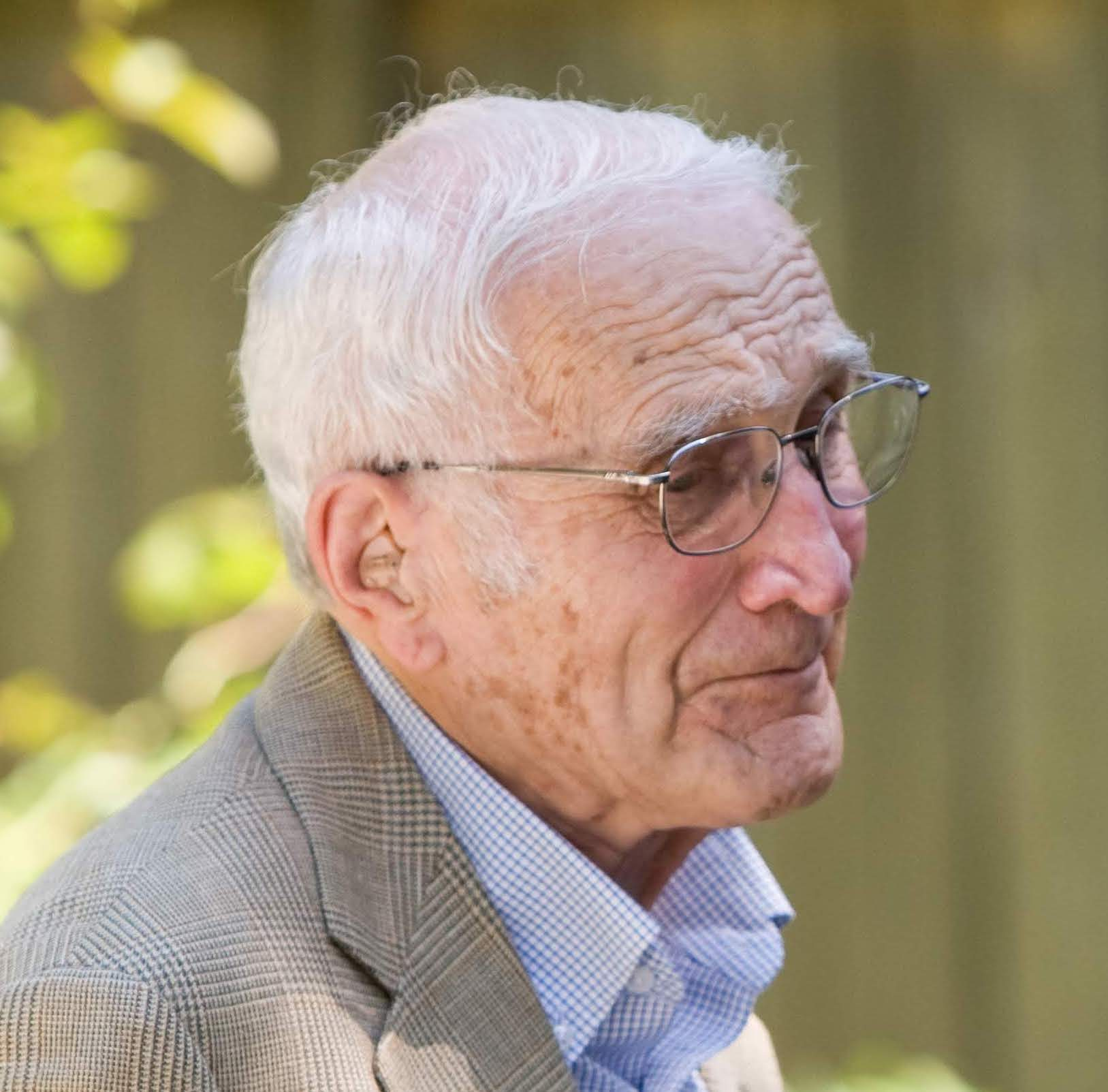
- Born: June 9, 1923; Los Angeles, California, U.S.
- Died: May 25, 2026 (aged 102); Seattle, Washington, U.S.
- Education: UCLA, 9th Air Force, UC Berkeley
- Known for: Offering conclusive evidence for the clonality of human cancers
- Spouse: Marion Mitchelson Gartler
- Scientific career
- Fields: Genetics
- Workplaces: UC Berkeley Columbia University University of Washington School of Medicine
- Academic advisors: Curt Stern

Stanley Michael Gartler (June 9, 1923 – May 25, 2026) was an American cell and molecular biologist and human geneticist. He was the first scientist to offer conclusive evidence for the clonality of human cancers. He showed that HeLa cells had contaminated many cell lines thought to be unique. Stanley Gartler was a Professor of Medicine and Genome Sciences at the University of Washington.

== Life and career ==
Stanley Michael Gartler was born on June 9, 1923, in Los Angeles, California, of Romanian immigrant parents George Gartler and Delvira Kupferber.

Gartler's sister, Adeline Gartler, was born on September 26, 1921.

Gartler attended public school in Los Angeles and completed two years at university (UCLA) before enlisting in the Army Air Force during World War II. He served as a radio operator and machine gunner on a B-26, and flew combat missions with the 9th Air Force. After the war, on the G.I. Bill, he completed his undergraduate education at UCLA in agriculture. He met his future wife, Marion Mitchelson, at a New Year’s Eve party in 1947 and the two were married in November 1948. After spending a year working on a farm in the San Joaquin Valley, Gartler entered the Ph.D. program in Genetics at UC Berkeley in 1949. He originally intended to apply genetics for agricultural uses, but near the end of his graduate work, he made a career switch and decided to enter the field of human genetics after enrolling in a course taught by Curt Stern.

In 1952 Gartler began a public health postdoctoral fellowship at Columbia University to study human genetics, which he completed over the course of five years. In 1957 Gartler was recruited by Arno G. Motulsky to join his newly established Division of Medical Genetics in the Department of Medicine at the University of Washington in Seattle. Gartler was a founding member of the Department of Genetics at the University of Washington in 1959. Stanley became a Professor Emeritus in 1993.

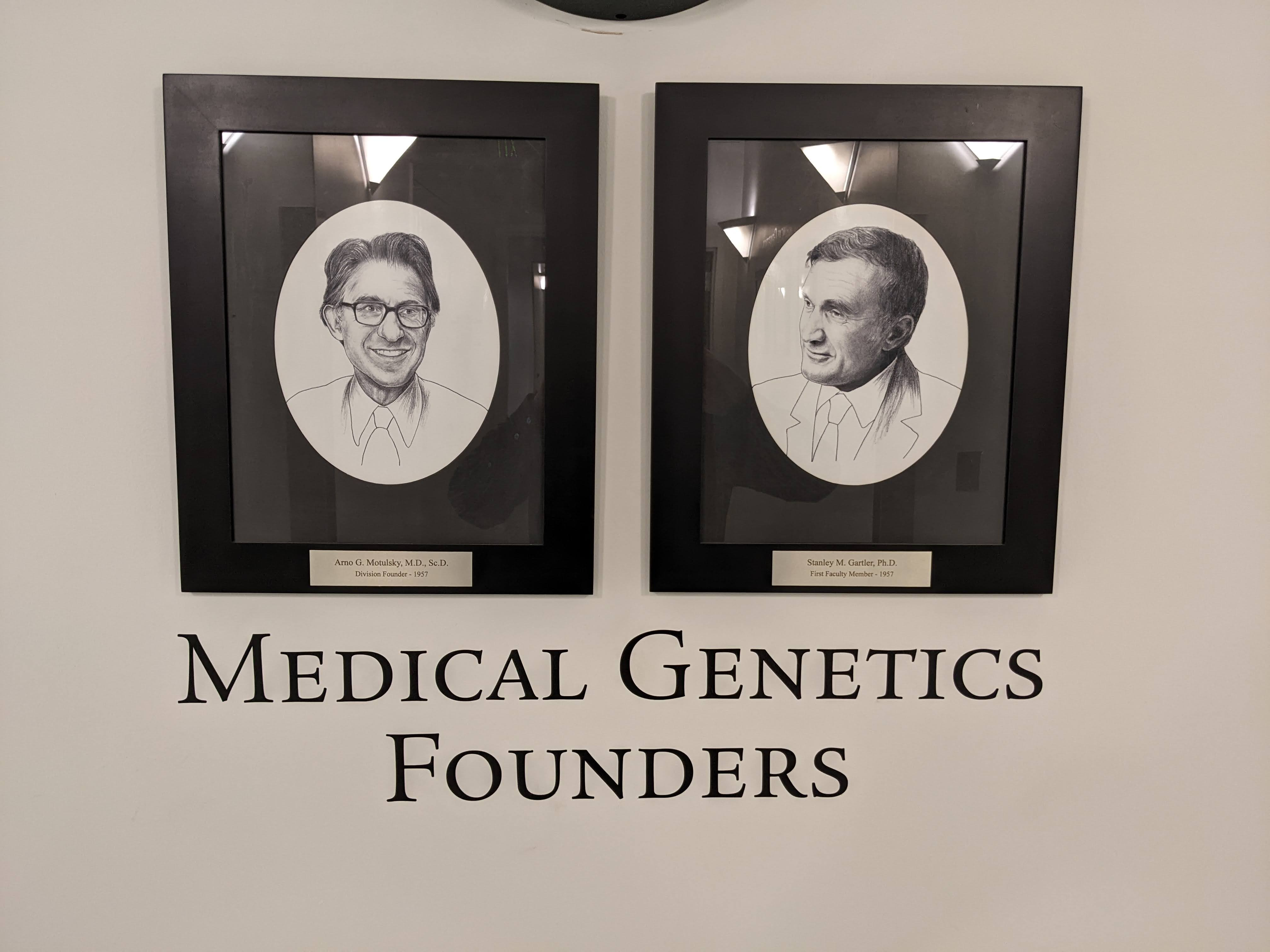
Commemorative plaque honoring the founding members of the University of Washington Division of Medical Genetics, Arno Motulsky and Stanley Gartler

Gartler died in Seattle, Washington on May 25, 2026, at the age of 102.

== Work ==
In 1965, Stanley Gartler and collaborator David Linder were able to demonstrate clonality of tumors in human females using an event (X chromosome inactivation) that occurs early in development in mammalian females. X chromosome inactivation randomly silences most of the genes on one of the two X chromosomes in every cell of the embryo. The female thus becomes a mosaic for any X-linked gene for which she is heterozygous, and normal tissues are consequently composed of a nearly equal mixture of cells expressing the two different phenotypes. Gartler reasoned that, if a tumor begins from a single cell, then all the cells of that tumor should express the same, single X-linked allele. By examining expression of different isoenzymes of the sex-linked glucose-6-phosphate dehydrogenase (G6PD) locus in heterozygous women, Gartler and Linder demonstrated that leiomyoma tumor cells, even those from cancers consisting of billions of cells, expressed only one form of the marker, whereas even small patches of normal tissue contained cells expressing both forms of the marker. This finding was consistent with the growth of a single founder cell into a tumor. The clonal origin of various tumors has been confirmed many times since, both initially through Gartler's work with a junior colleague, Philip J. Fialkow, and by other groups.

In 1967, Gartler became interested in establishing a system for studying human genetics in somatic cell culture. He initially studied eighteen (supposedly) independently derived established human cell lines obtained from the American Type Culture Collection, including HeLa. Examining isoenzymes, he typed them for a number of genetic polymorphisms, including the X-linked G6PD variant. The cell lines turned out to be genetically identical, and moreover, all carried the G6PD allele found almost exclusively in people of African descent. HeLa, which was the first successfully established human cell line, was derived from a woman of African descent named Henrietta Lacks, so this result suggested that the cell lines were not truly independent, but had instead been contaminated by HeLa cells.

It was not realized at the time that nearly all attempts to establish human cell cultures resulted in cell lines with limited life spans. Dr. George Gey, the originator of HeLa, had sent those cells to all who requested them, and the contamination problem arose because many workers were growing the immortal HeLa cell and mortal human cell strains in close proximity. Since the use of genetic markers to characterize and distinguish cell lines at the time was virtually non-existent, contamination events from HeLa went undetected. In spite of the evidence, initially, the idea of laboratory errors leading to cross culture contamination was not universally accepted: an alternative explanation was that, when cultures became established, their G6PD phenotype changed. Gartler's original paper to Nature went to lengths to dismiss this possibility, surveying over 100 tumors to see if there was a phenotypic change in either G6PD or PGM, as well as trying other experimental approaches to test the idea. He concluded that "all evidence seems to point to the stability of the G6PD and PGM phenotypes both in vivo and in vitro." Further evidence against the possibility of phenotypic conversion came when Nellie Auesperg and Gartler identified a truly independently established human cell line, which they showed to exhibit unique genetic markers.

Cross-culture contamination is now a generally accepted risk in establishing cell lines, and there are many genetic markers available to accurately characterize human cell cultures. However, the problem of cross-culture contamination has not been eliminated. Walter Nelson-Rees took up the issue some ten years after the original Gartler report, and continued to write about the problem for almost 25 years.

Gartler's later career reflected his continued interest in the X chromosome and X inactivation. Such work included discovery of the presence of two functional X chromosomes within oocytes, demonstrating the association between fragile X syndrome and delayed replication of FMR1, and identification of DNMT3B as the gene underlying Immunodeficiency–centromeric instability–facial anomalies syndrome, the first recognized human hypomethylation disease.

In 1991, evolutionary biologist Leigh Van Valen put forth an argument that the HeLa cell line constituted a new microbial species, which he proposed be designated Helacyton gartleri, in recognition of Gartler's work.

== Honors ==
- U.S. Public Health Service Career Development Award
- U.S. Public Health Service Career Award
- NIH Merit Scholar
- Fellow, American Association for the Advancement of Science
- President, American Society of Human Genetics
- Honorary Fellow, American College of Medical Genetics
- Member, National Academy of Sciences
- Recipient Victor A. McKusick Leadership Award from the American Society of Human Genetics 2016
