= Paul B. Rothman =

American academic administrator

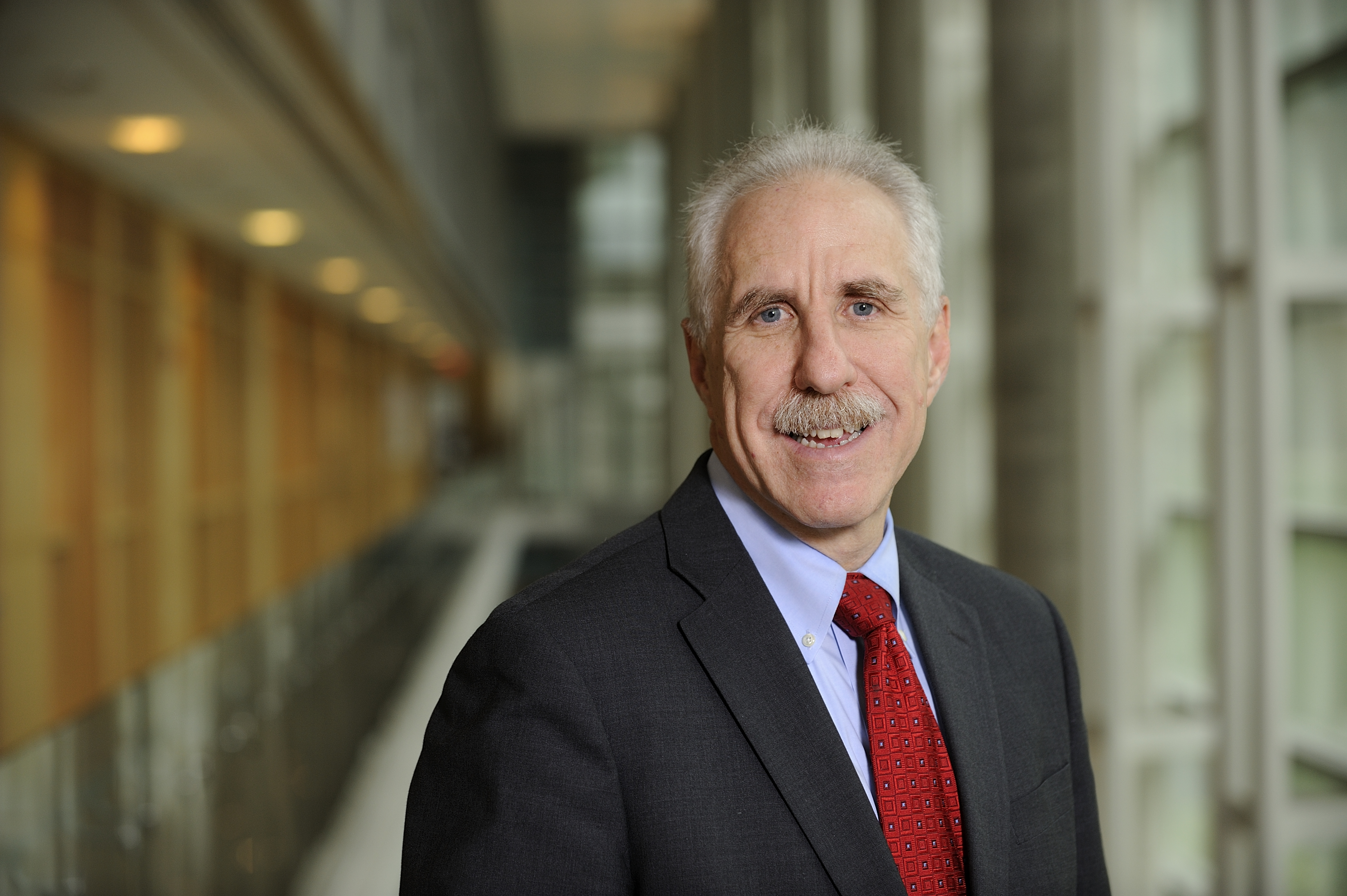

Paul B. Rothman (born 1958) is the former Frances Watt Baker, M.D., and Lenox D. Baker Jr., M.D., Dean of the Medical Faculty, vice president for medicine at Johns Hopkins University, and former chief executive officer of Johns Hopkins Medicine. As dean and CEO, Rothman oversaw both the School of Medicine and the Johns Hopkins Health System, which together encompass six hospitals, hundreds of faculty and community physicians and a self-funded health plan.

== Education and career ==
Rothman was born in New York City in 1958 and grew up in Bayside, Queens. He began his research career as an undergraduate at the Massachusetts Institute of Technology, where he studied E. coli DNA repair under Graham C. Walker. He was also captain of the varsity crew team. He completed his B.S. in biology in 1980 and was elected to Phi Beta Kappa. He then entered medical school at Yale University. While at Yale, Rothman studied T cell subsets in the lab of Leonard Chess at Columbia University. He received his medical degree in 1984, earning a place in the Alpha Omega Alpha Medical Honor Society.

He went on to a medical residency and rheumatology fellowship at Columbia-Presbyterian Medical Center in New York City before joining the medical faculty of the Columbia University College of Physicians and Surgeons in 1986. There, he also completed a postdoctoral biochemistry fellowship with Frederick W. Alt, a Howard Hughes Medical Institute investigator, studying immunoglobulin class-switch recombination. At Columbia, Rothman was appointed the Richard J. Stock Professor of Medicine (Immunology) and Microbiology and chief of the pulmonary, allergy and critical care division.

A molecular immunologist, Rothman's research focused on immune system molecules called cytokines. He investigated the role these molecules play in the normal development of blood cells, in addition to the abnormal blood-cell development that leads to leukemia. He also studied the function of cytokines in immune system responses to allergies and asthma. The National Institutes of Health consistently funded his work.

In 2004, Rothman accepted a position as head of internal medicine at the Carver College of Medicine at the University of Iowa. In 2008, he was named dean of the Carver College of Medicine and leader of its clinical practice plan, a role in which he served for four years. In 2012, he became the 14th dean of the Johns Hopkins School of Medicine and the second CEO of Johns Hopkins Medicine.

Rothman is on the Board of Directors of Merck and Company and Labcorp. In addition, he serves on the Boards the University of Chicago Health System, USC Health System and the King Faisal Specialist Hospital & Research Centre in Saudi Arabia.

== Honors and appointments ==
Rothman is a member of the National Academy of Medicine, the American Academy of Arts and Sciences, and the American Society for Clinical Investigation. He has served as president of the Association of American Physicians and the Society of Medical Administrators, and was elected as a Fellow of the American Association for the Advancement of Science.

He is married to Frances Meyer, a gastroenterologist.
