= George Otto Gey =

American cell biologist (1899–1970)

- Born: July 6, 1899; Pittsburgh, Pennsylvania, US
- Died: November 8, 1970 (aged 71); Baltimore, Maryland, US
- Education: University of Pittsburgh; Johns Hopkins University
- Known for: Propagating the HeLa cell line
- Spouse: Margaret Gey (m. 1926)
- Children: 2
- Scientific career
- Fields: Cell biology
- Workplaces: Johns Hopkins University; University of Pittsburgh

George Otto Gey (/ɡaɪ/ GHY; July 6, 1899 – November 8, 1970) was an American cell biologist at Johns Hopkins Hospital who is credited with propagating the HeLa cell line from Henrietta Lacks' cervical tumor. He spent over 35 years developing numerous scientific breakthroughs under the Johns Hopkins Medical School and Hospital.

== Early life and education ==
Gey was born in Pittsburgh, Pennsylvania, on July 6, 1899, the son of German immigrants Frank and Emma Gey. He had an older brother and younger sister. Gey's parents immigrated from Germany, and according to the 1910 United States census, they lived in suburban Pittsburgh.

Gey graduated from Peabody High School and received an undergraduate degree in biology from the University of Pittsburgh in 1920. He worked as a carpenter and a mason to help pay his way through college. Around 1926, he married Margaret K. (1900–1989), and they later moved to Baltimore where he would earn his medical degree from Johns Hopkins University. Gey was in medical school off and on for eight years, as he kept running out of money to pay for the tuition.

== Career ==
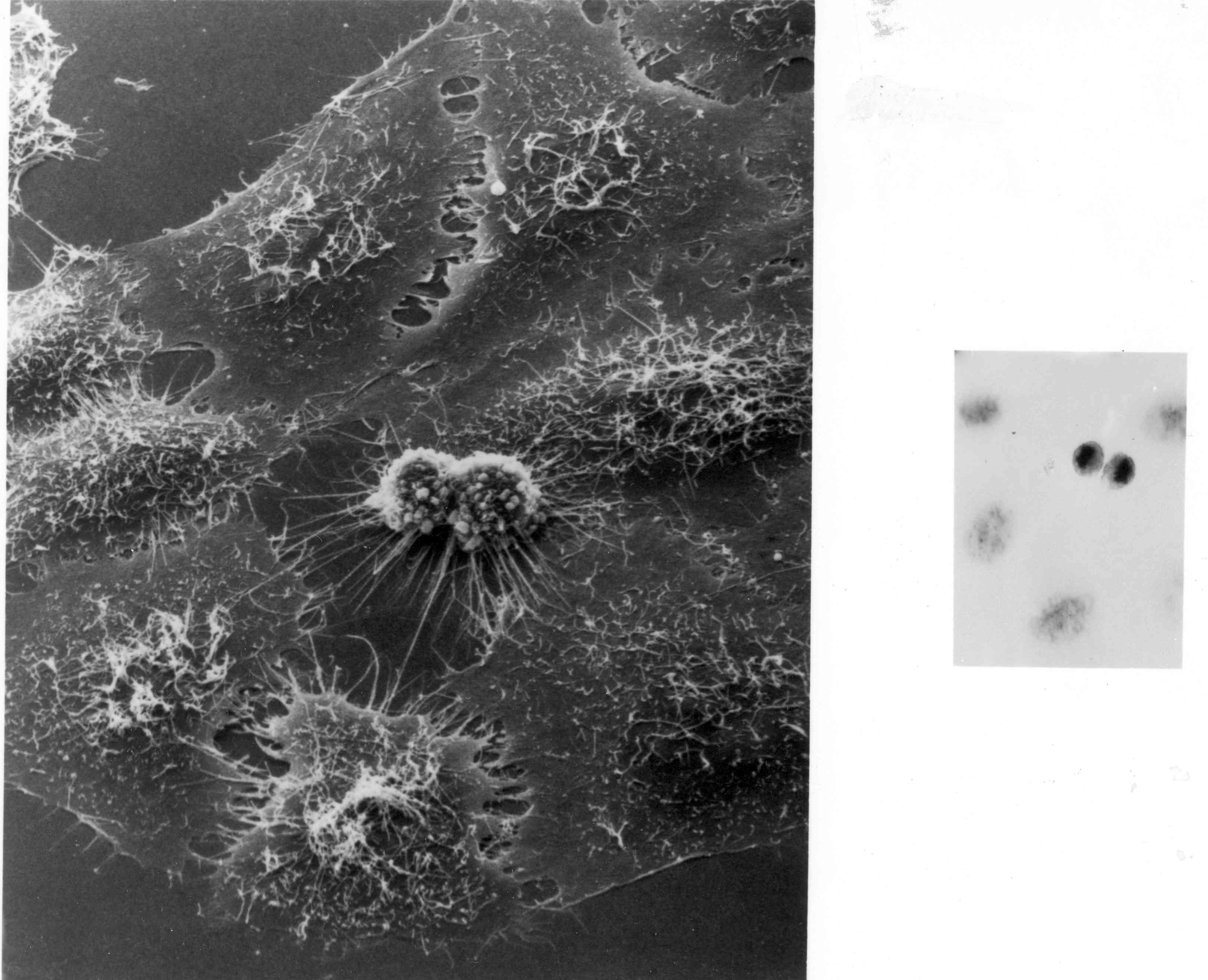
Scanning electron micrograph of cultured HeLa cells infected with adenovirus, taken in 1976. These cells were originally from Henrietta Lacks and were first grown in the laboratory of Dr Gey in 1951. A light micrograph (x130) of the same cells (inset) reveals rounded double cells in the center, in the process of dividing.

After graduating Hopkins in 1933, Gey immediately began his 37-year teaching career at the Johns Hopkins Medical School.

In 1951, Gey's research assistant, Mary Kubicek, isolated cells from a cervical tumor removed by a surgeon found in a woman named Henrietta Lacks. These cells proved to be very unusual in that they could grow in culture medium which was constantly stirred using the roller drum a technique developed by Gey; they did not need a glass surface to grow, and therefore they had no space limit. Once Gey realized the longevity and hardiness of these cells which he called HeLa cells, he began sharing them with scientists all over the world, and the use of the HeLa cell line became widespread. The cells were used in the development of the polio vaccine, led to the first clone of a human cell, helped in the discovery that humans have 46 chromosomes, and were used to develop in vitro fertilization. By the time Gey published a short abstract claiming some credit for the development of the line, the cells were already being used by scientists all over the world.

Due to the unusual growth capabilities of the HeLa cell line, it also contaminated many cell cultures and ruined years of research, as discovered by Stanley Gartler in 1966. The cells, as it turned out, could float on dust particles and could be transferred on unwashed hands or used pipettes, and therefore end up in other cell cultures. Because the cells were so pervasive, just one could lead to the complete takeover of a culture.

=== Gey Culture Medium and the Chicken Bleeding Technique ===
Gey and his wife developed their own cell culture medium which would preserve cell lines, but their greatest obstacle was contamination. George's biology training did not prepare him for contamination issues that may arise in certain instances, so his wife Margaret was the one who educated him on this topic. Their cell culture recipe was constantly changing and being modified, but one recipe contained unusual ingredients such as chicken blood and cow fetuses. This is how he and his wife came up with the "Chicken Bleeding Technique", and the process was eventually recorded for other researchers interested in the technique. The "Chicken Bleeding Technique" was a way to draw blood from a chicken, which involved forcefully pinning down a chicken by the feet and the neck onto a butcher block and inserting a syringe needle into the chicken's heart.

=== Tissue Culture Association (TCA) ===
During Gey's tenure at Johns Hopkins, he founded and was the first president of the Tissue Culture Association (TCA). The main object of the TCA was to introduce scientists to tissue, culture methodology, and train technical personnel. TCA is known today as the Society for In Vitro Biology, which currently embraces over 1,500 members. Through years of fundraising Gey was able to raise the millions of dollars needed to open the permanent home for the TCA, W. Alton Jones Cell Science Center at Lake Placid, New York. A few of the medical advances achieved through the TCA include the clone growth of rodent cells, the development of time lapse cinematography, and the electron microscopic examination of cell structures.

=== Controversies ===
There has been controversy surrounding how the cells were retrieved, as made famous by the book, The Immortal Life of Henrietta Lacks, since the cells were taken from Henrietta Lacks without her knowledge or permission, and her family remained unaware until the 1970s. Gey was careful to keep her actual name secret, and it was not made public until after his death.

== Personal life and death ==
Gey and his wife had two children, George O. Gey Jr. and Frances Green. George O. Gey Jr., became a cardiologist, completing his internship and residency at Johns Hopkins Bayview Medical Center.

On November 8, 1970, Gey died from pancreatic cancer in Baltimore, Maryland, less than a year after his initial diagnosis. When undergoing an emergency procedure for his cancer, doctors found that the cancer had spread to his lymph nodes, lungs and heart, thus making his cancer inoperable. Gey traveled to New York City to enroll himself in an experimental chemotherapy trial. He wanted doctors to try to cut out a piece of the cancer in his pancreas to grow a new cell line for cancer research. The doctors, however, found the cancer had spread to so many organs that it was too dangerous to remove any for research purposes. Gey was "furious" upon learning of this.

== Legacy ==
Gey is credited for creating the roller drum, which was essential for the development of the HeLa cell line. This machine was one of the first to help nurture cell cultures. The roller drum consisted of various holes where tissues and their appropriate growth substances were all located. The drum spun in order to mix the substances and once an hour allow the cultures to be exposed to the environment until the drum rolled again and rebathed the cells in liquid.

Gey is also noted to be one of the first to document cell division and growth on film. He devised a time lapse camera that stood twelve feet, built out of spare parts from a nearby junkyard, with a temperature controlled incubator.

An important legacy Gey left on the scientific world was his teaching. In his lab, the belief was that "the way to kill your cell cultures was by using a sloppy technique". He trained hundreds of researchers around the world in his sterile techniques and introduced the world to cautious studies. Although Gey didn't publish a paper on his invention and use of the roller tube, or patent it before his untimely death, he left a legacy of understanding cancer, and began the foundation from which cancer research and cell culture has grown from.

== Awards and honors ==
In 1954, the Memorial Sloan-Kettering Cancer Center selected Gey to receive the Katherine Burken Judd Award for his contributions to cancer research. He won the Wien Award for Cancer Cytology in 1956.
