= Henrietta Lacks =

African-American woman (1920–1951), source of HeLa immortal cell line

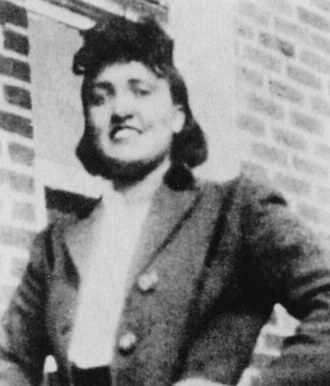
- Lacks c. 1945–1951 (Note: This photo is one of the few known photos of Lacks. It was printed in medical literature; its origin is unknown.)
- Born: Loretta Pleasant; August 1, 1920; Roanoke, Virginia, U.S.
- Died: October 4, 1951 (aged 31); Baltimore, Maryland, U.S.
- Cause of death: Cervical cancer
- Monuments: Henrietta Lacks Health and Bioscience High School; historical marker at Clover, Virginia
- Occupations: Housewife; tobacco farmer
- Height: approx. 5 ft (150 cm)
- Spouse: David Lacks (m. 1941)
- Children: 5

Henrietta Lacks (née Loretta Pleasant; August 1, 1920 – October 4, 1951) was an African-American woman whose cancer cells are the source of the HeLa cell line, the first immortalized human cell line (Note: "In Steve Silberman's Book Review of The Immortal Life of Henrietta Lacks (Nature 463, 610; 2010), ... Your lead-in claims that the death of Henrietta Lacks "led to the first immortal cell line", but that distinction belongs to the L929 cell line, which was derived from mouse connective tissue and described almost a decade earlier (W. Earle J. Natl Cancer Inst. 4, 165–212; 1943). As Silberman notes, Lacks's was the first mass-produced human cell line.") and one of the most important cell lines in medical research. An immortalized cell line reproduces indefinitely under specific conditions, and the HeLa cell line continues to be a source of invaluable medical data and research to the present day.

Lacks was the unwitting source of these cells from a tumor biopsied during her treatment for cervical cancer at the Johns Hopkins Hospital in Baltimore, Maryland, in 1951. These cells were then cultured by George Otto Gey, who created the cell line known as HeLa, which is still used for medical research. As was then the practice, no consent was required to culture the cells obtained from Lacks's treatment.

Even though some information about the origins of HeLa's immortalized cell lines was known to researchers after 1970, the Lacks family was not made aware of the line's existence until 1975. With knowledge of the cell line's genetic provenance becoming public, its use for medical research and for commercial purposes continues to raise concerns about privacy and patients' rights.

== Biography ==
=== Early life ===
Henrietta Lacks was born Loretta Pleasant on August 1, 1920, in Roanoke, Virginia, to Eliza Pleasant (née Lacks) (1886–1924) and John "Johnny" Randall Pleasant (1881–1969). She is remembered as having hazel eyes, a small waist, size 6 shoes, and always wearing red nail polish and a neatly pleated skirt. Her family is uncertain how her name changed from Loretta to Henrietta, but she was nicknamed Hennie. When Lacks was four years old in 1924, her mother died giving birth to her tenth child. Unable to care for the children alone after his wife's death, Lacks's father moved the family to Clover, Virginia where the children were distributed among relatives. Lacks ended up with her maternal grandfather, Thomas "Tommy" Henry Lacks, in a two-story log cabin that was once the slave quarters on the plantation that had been owned by Henrietta's white great-grandfather and great-uncle. She shared a room with her nine-year-old first cousin, David "Day" Lacks (1915–2002).

Like most members of her family living in Clover, Lacks worked as a tobacco farmer starting from an early age. She fed the animals, tended the garden, and toiled in the tobacco fields. She attended the designated black school two miles away from the cabin until she had to drop out to help support the family when she was in the sixth grade.

In 1935 Day and Henrietta had a son, called Lawrence (1935–2023), when Day was 19 and Henrietta was only 14. In 1939, their daughter Elsie (1939–1955) was born. Elsie had epilepsy and cerebral palsy.

=== Marriage and family ===
On April 10, 1941, having already had two children, David "Day" Lacks and Henrietta Lacks were married in Halifax County, Virginia. Later that year, their cousin, Fred Garrett, convinced the couple to leave the tobacco farm in Virginia and move to Turner Station, near Dundalk, Maryland in Baltimore County, so Day could work in Bethlehem Steel at Sparrows Point, Maryland. Not long after they moved to Maryland, Garrett was called to fight in World War II. With the savings gifted to him by Garrett, Day Lacks was able to purchase a house at 713 New Pittsburgh Avenue in Turner Station. Now part of Dundalk, Turner Station was one of the oldest and largest African-American communities in Baltimore County at that time.

Living in Maryland, Henrietta and Day Lacks had three more children: David "Sonny" Lacks Jr. (1947–2022), Deborah Lacks (later known as Deborah Lacks Pullum, 1949–2009), and Joseph Lacks (later known as Zakariyya Bari Abdul Rahman after converting to Islam, 1950–2020). Henrietta gave birth to her last child at the Johns Hopkins Hospital in Baltimore in November 1950, four and a half months before she was diagnosed with cervical cancer. Zakariyya believed his birth to be a miracle as he was "fighting off the cancer cells growing all around him". Around the same time, Elsie was placed in the Hospital for the Negro Insane, later renamed Crownsville Hospital Center, where she died in 1955 at 15 years of age. Historian Paul Lurz says that it is possible that Elsie was subjected to the pneumoencephalography procedure, where a hole was drilled into a patient's head to drain fluid from the brain, which was then replaced with oxygen or helium to make it easier to see the patient's brain in X-rays.

Both Lacks and her husband were Catholic.

=== Illness ===
==== Diagnosis and treatment ====
On January 29, 1951, Lacks went to Johns Hopkins because she felt a "knot" in her womb. She had previously told her cousins about the "knot" and they assumed correctly that she was pregnant. But after giving birth to Joseph, Lacks had a severe hemorrhage. Her primary care doctor, William C. Wade, referred her back to Johns Hopkins. There, her doctor, Howard W. Jones, took a biopsy of a mass found on Lacks's cervix for laboratory testing. Soon after, Lacks was told that she had a malignant epidermoid carcinoma of the cervix. (Note: Squamous cell carcinoma is a cancer of the squamous cells, a type of epithelial cell, and is the second-most common type of skin cancer. They are found on the neck, head, cervix, and anus, as well as other body sites.) In 1970, physicians discovered that she had been misdiagnosed and actually had an adenocarcinoma. (Note: Adenocarcinomas are a type of cancerous tumor or an abnormal growth of epithelial tissue. 10% to 15% of cancers of the cervix are adenocarcinomas, the rest more commonly being squamous cell carcinomas.) This was a common mistake at the time, and the treatment would not have differed.

Lacks was treated with radium tube inserts as an inpatient and discharged a few days later with instructions to return for X-ray treatments as a follow-up. During her treatments, two samples were taken from Lacks's cervix without her permission or knowledge; one sample was of healthy tissue and the other was cancerous. These samples were given to George Otto Gey, a physician and cancer researcher at Johns Hopkins. The cells from the cancerous sample eventually became known as the HeLa immortal cell line, a commonly used cell line in contemporary biomedical research.

=== Death and burial ===
On August 8, 1951, Lacks, who was 31 years old, went to Johns Hopkins for a routine treatment session and asked to be admitted due to continued severe abdominal pain. She received blood transfusions and remained at the hospital until her death on October 4, 1951. A partial autopsy showed that the cancer had metastasized throughout her entire body.

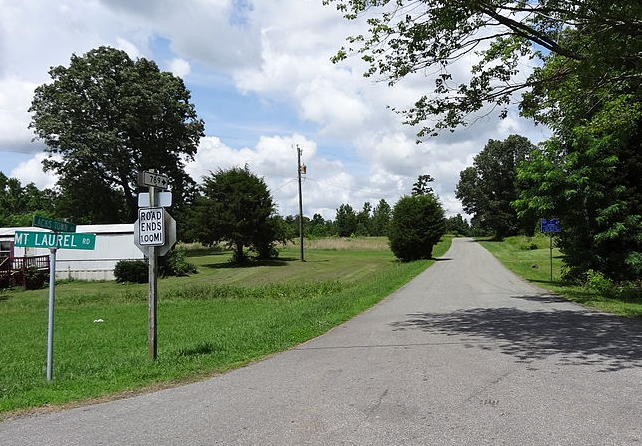
Lacks Town Road in Clover, Virginia, near where Lacks grew up and is buried

Lacks was buried in an unmarked grave in the family cemetery, in a section of Clover, Virginia, called Lackstown. Lacks's exact burial location is unknown, but the family believes that it is within a few feet of her mother's gravesite, which for decades was the only one in the family to have been marked with a tombstone. In 2010, Roland Pattillo, a faculty member of the Morehouse School of Medicine who had worked with George Gey and knew the Lacks family, donated a headstone for Lacks. This prompted her family to raise money for a headstone for Elsie Lacks as well, which was dedicated on the same day. The book-shaped headstone of Henrietta Lacks contains an epitaph written by her grandchildren that reads:

Henrietta Lacks, August 1, 1920 – October 4, 1951
In loving memory of a phenomenal woman,
wife and mother who touched the lives of many.
Here lies Henrietta Lacks (HeLa). Her immortal
cells will continue to help mankind forever.
Eternal Love and Admiration, From Your Family

== Medical and scientific research ==
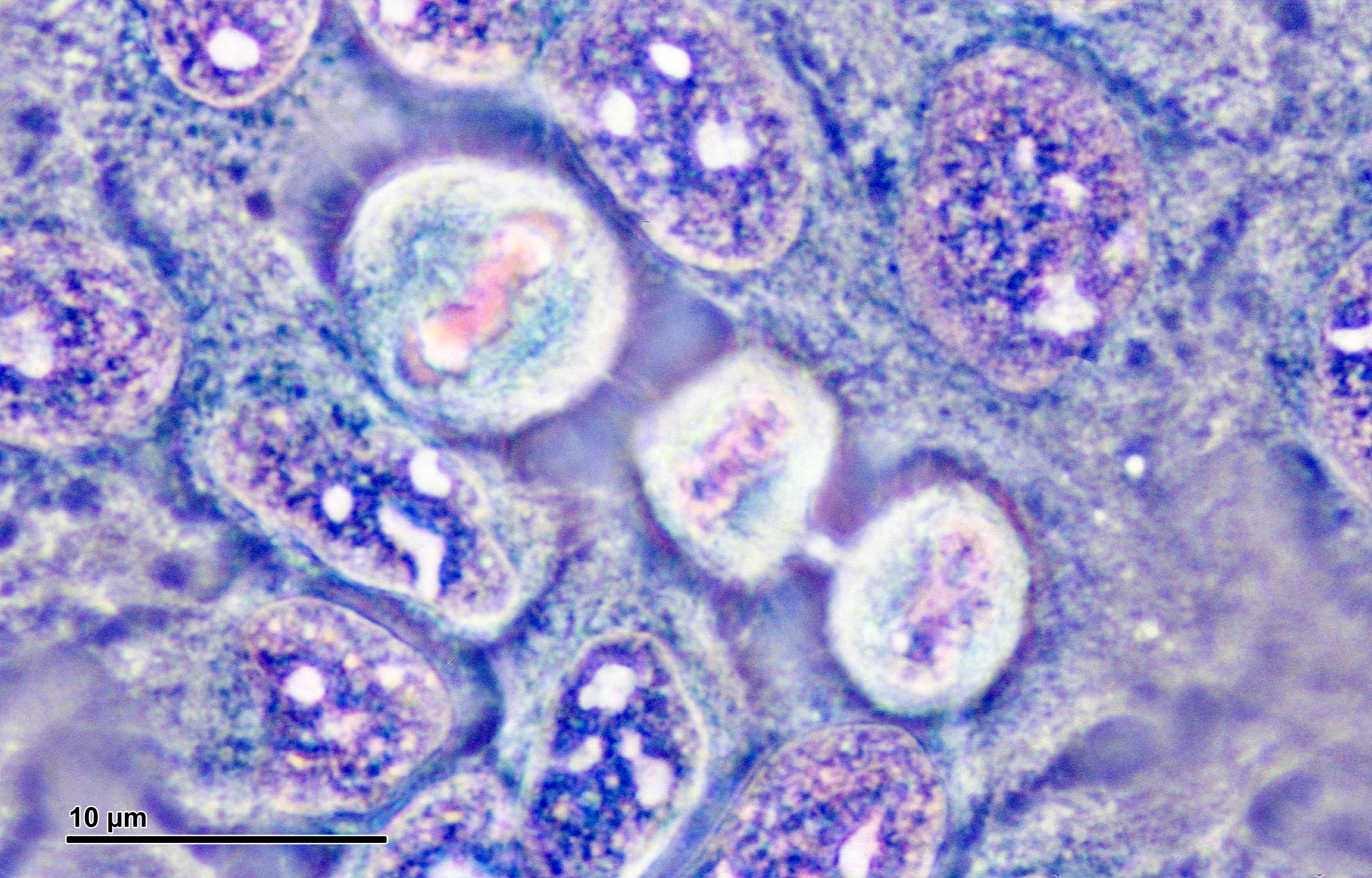
Dividing HeLa cells in culture. The cells can be seen metaphase and telophase, different stages of cell division.

George Otto Gey, the first researcher to study Lacks's cancerous cells, observed that these cells were unusual in that they reproduced at a very high rate and could be kept alive long enough in culture to allow more in-depth examination. Until then, cells cultured for laboratory studies survived for only a few days at most, which was not long enough to perform a variety of different tests on the same sample. Lacks's cells were the first to be observed that could be divided multiple times without dying, which is why they became known as "immortal". After Lacks's death, Gey had Mary Kubicek, his lab assistant, take further HeLa samples while Henrietta's body was at Johns Hopkins' autopsy facility. The roller-tube technique (Note: The roller-tube technique was invented by George Gey in his lab at the University of Pittsburgh. "And then there was the roller drum, the invention that churned in the enormous incubator room Gey built to keep the cell cultures warm. The huge metal drum with holes covering its inner surface gyrated like a cement mixer 24 hours a day. And tucked within each hole, at the bottom of Gey's home-blown-glass roller tubes, were tiny pieces of tissue bathed in nutrient-rich fluids, gathering the nourishment necessary for survival. As the drum rotated one turn every hour, the cells surfaced, free to breathe and excrete until the liquid bathed them again. If all went well, the cells adhered to the walls of the tubes and began to flourish." – Rebecca Skloot This method of growing tissue cultures was also used in the development of Jonas Salk's polio vaccine and by John Enders in his Nobel prize-winning polio research.) was the method used to culture the cells obtained from the samples that Kubicek collected. Gey was able to start a cell line from Lacks's sample by isolating one specific cell and repeatedly dividing it, meaning that the same cell could then be used for conducting many experiments. They became known as HeLa cells, because Gey's standard method for labeling samples was to use the first two letters of the patient's first and last names.

The ability to rapidly reproduce HeLa cells in a laboratory setting has led to many important breakthroughs in biomedical research. For example, by 1954, Jonas Salk was using HeLa cells in his research to develop the polio vaccine. To test his new vaccine, the cells were mass-produced in the first-ever cell production factory. Additionally, Chester M. Southam, a leading virologist, injected HeLa cells into cancer patients, prison inmates, and healthy individuals in order to observe whether cancer could be transmitted as well as to examine if one could become immune to cancer by developing an acquired immune response.

HeLa cells were in high demand and put into mass production. They were mailed to scientists around the globe for "research into cancer, AIDS, the effects of radiation and toxic substances, gene mapping, and countless other scientific pursuits". HeLa cells were the first human cells successfully cloned, in 1955, and have since been used to test human sensitivity to tape, glue, cosmetics, and many other products. There are almost 11,000 patents involving HeLa cells.

In the early 1970s, a large portion of other cell cultures became contaminated by HeLa cells. As a result, members of Henrietta Lacks's family received solicitations for blood samples from researchers hoping to learn about the family's genetics in order to differentiate between HeLa cells and other cell lines.

Alarmed and confused, several family members began questioning why they were receiving so many telephone calls requesting blood samples. In 1975, the family also learned through a chance dinner-party conversation that material originating in Henrietta Lacks was continuing to be used for medical research. Prior to this, the family had never discussed Henrietta's illness and death among themselves.

=== Consent issues and privacy concerns ===
Neither Henrietta Lacks nor her family had given her physicians permission to harvest her cells. At that time, permission was neither required nor customarily sought. The cells were used in medical research and for commercial purposes. In the 1980s, family medical records were published without family consent. A similar issue was brought up in the Supreme Court of California case of Moore v. Regents of the University of California in 1990. The court ruled that a person's discarded tissue and cells are not their property and can be commercialized.

In March 2013, researchers published the DNA sequence of the genome of a strain of HeLa cells. The Lacks family discovered this when the author Rebecca Skloot informed them. There were objections from the Lacks family about the genetic information that was available for public access. Jeri Lacks Whye, a grandchild of Henrietta Lacks, said to The New York Times, "the biggest concern was privacy—what information was actually going to be out there about our grandmother, and what information they can obtain from her sequencing that will tell them about her children and grandchildren and going down the line." That same year another group working on a different HeLa cell line's genome under National Institutes of Health (NIH) funding, submitted it for publication. In August 2013, an agreement was announced between the family and the NIH that gave the family some control over access to the cells' DNA sequence found in the two studies along with a promise of acknowledgement in scientific papers. In addition, two family members will join the six-member committee that will regulate access to the sequence data. (Note: "The Lacks family and the N.I.H. settled on an agreement: the data from both studies should be stored in the institutes' database of genotypes and phenotypes. Researchers who want to use the data can apply for access and will have to submit annual reports about their research. A so-called HeLa Genome Data Access working group at the N.I.H. will review the applications. Two members of the Lacks family will be members. The agreement does not provide the Lacks family with proceeds from any commercial products that may be developed from research on the HeLa genome.")

In October 2021, Lacks's estate filed a lawsuit against Thermo Fisher Scientific for profiting from the HeLa cell line without Lacks's consent, asking for "the full amount of [Thermo Fisher's] net profits". On July 31, 2023, Thermo Fisher Scientific settled with the Lacks family on undisclosed terms.

In February 2026, the Lacks family gained an out-of-court settlement with a second biotech company, Switzerland-based Novartis. Details of the settlement have not been made public. Lawsuits against several other drug companies are still ongoing.

== Recognition ==
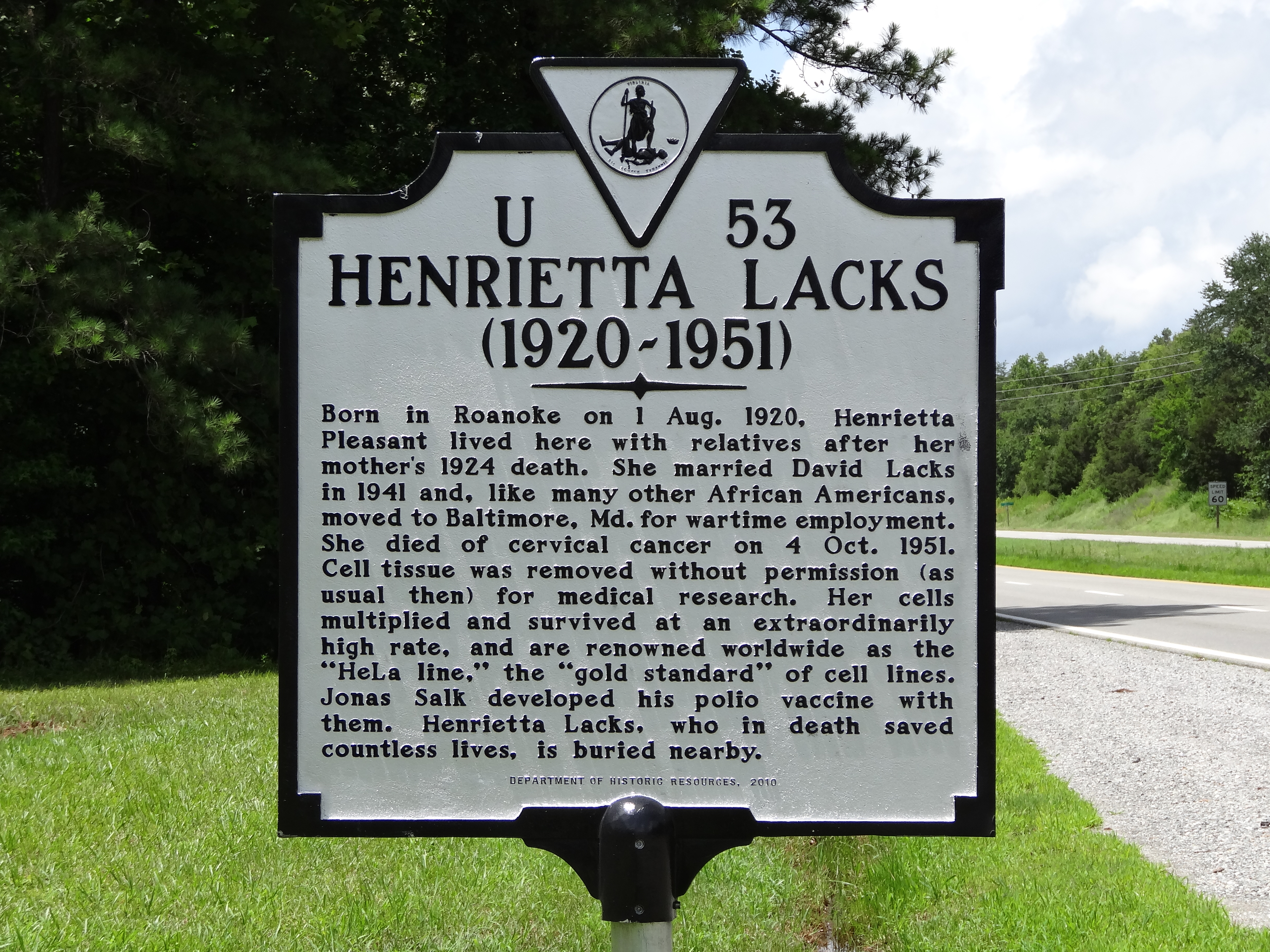
A historical marker memorializing Henrietta Lacks in Clover, Virginia

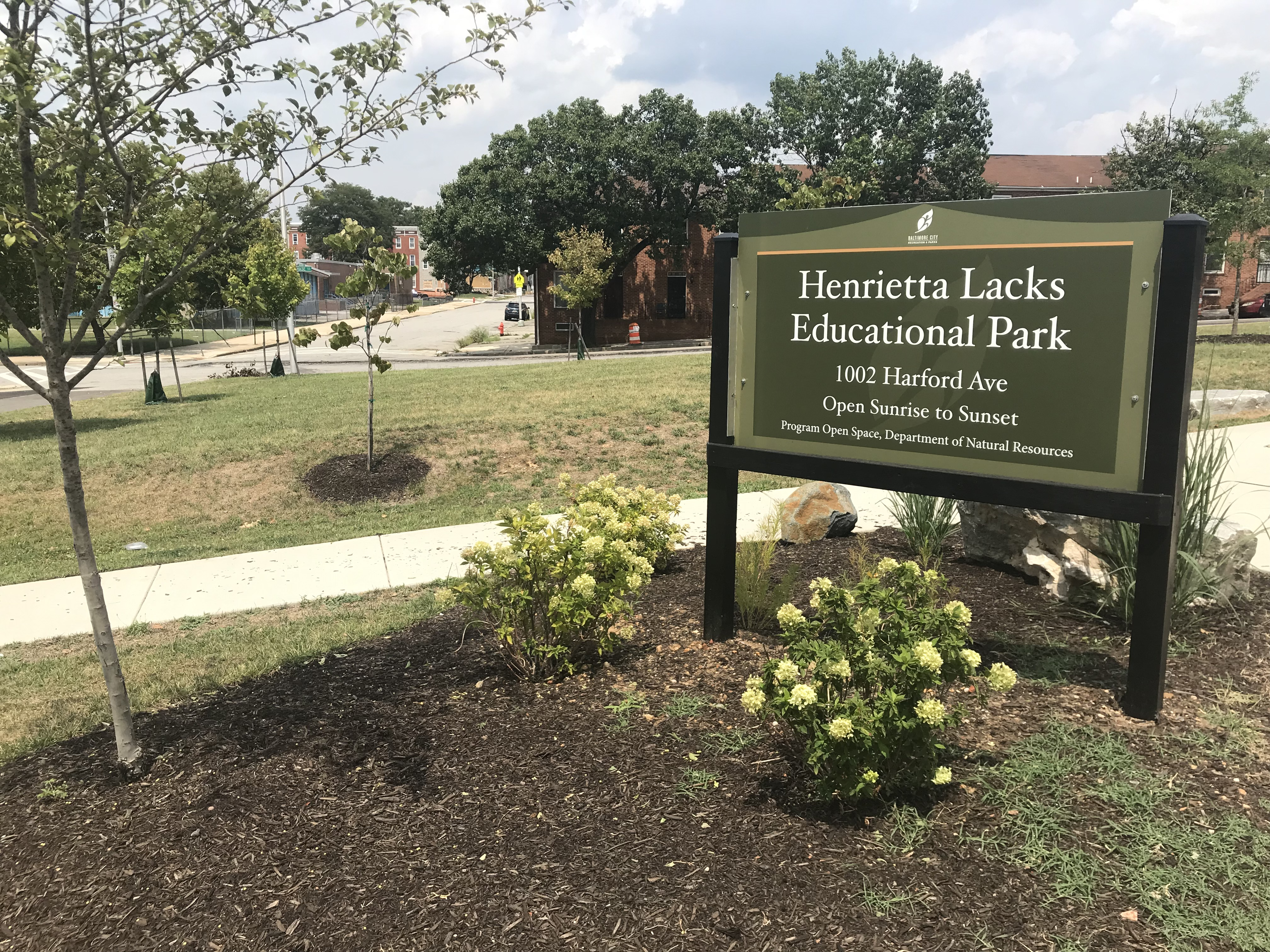
A park named in honor of Henrietta Lacks in Baltimore, Maryland

In 1996, Morehouse School of Medicine held its first annual HeLa Women's Health Conference. Led by physician Roland Pattillo, the conference is held to give recognition to Henrietta Lacks, her cell line, and "the valuable contribution made by African Americans to medical research and clinical practice". The mayor of Atlanta declared the date of the first conference, October 11, 1996, "Henrietta Lacks Day".

Lacks's contributions continue to be celebrated at yearly events in Turner Station. At one such event in 1997, then-U.S. Congressman from Maryland, Robert Ehrlich, presented a congressional resolution recognizing Lacks and her contributions to medical science and research.

In 2010, the Johns Hopkins Institute for Clinical and Translational Research established the annual Henrietta Lacks Memorial Lecture Series, to honor Henrietta Lacks and the global impact of HeLa cells on medicine and research.

In 2011, Morgan State University in Baltimore granted Lacks a posthumous honorary doctorate in public service. Also in 2011, the Evergreen School District in Vancouver, Washington, named their new high school focused on medical careers the Henrietta Lacks Health and Bioscience High School, becoming the first organization to memorialize her publicly by naming a school in her honor.

In 2014, Lacks was inducted into the Maryland Women's Hall of Fame. In 2017, a minor planet in the main asteroid belt was named "359426 Lacks" in her honor.

In 2018, The New York Times published a belated obituary for her, as part of the Overlooked history project. Also in 2018, the National Portrait Gallery and the National Museum of African-American History and Culture jointly announced the accession of a portrait of Lacks by Kadir Nelson.

On October 6, 2018, Johns Hopkins University announced plans to name a research building in honor of Lacks. The announcement was made at the 9th annual Henrietta Lacks Memorial Lecture in the Turner Auditorium in East Baltimore by Johns Hopkins University President Ronald J. Daniels and Paul B. Rothman, CEO of Johns Hopkins Medicine and dean of the medical faculty of the Johns Hopkins University School of Medicine, surrounded by several of Lacks's descendants. "Through her life and her immortal cells, Henrietta Lacks made an immeasurable impact on science and medicine that has touched countless lives around the world," Daniels said. "This building will stand as a testament to her transformative impact on scientific discovery and the ethics that must undergird its pursuit. We at Johns Hopkins are profoundly grateful to the Lacks family for their partnership as we continue to learn from Mrs. Lacks's life and to honor her enduring legacy." The building will adjoin the Berman Institute of Bioethics' Deering Hall, located at the corner of Ashland and Rutland Avenues and "will support programs that enhance participation and partnership with members of the community in research that can benefit the community, as well as extend the opportunities to further study and promote research ethics and community engagement in research through an expansion of the Berman Institute and its work."

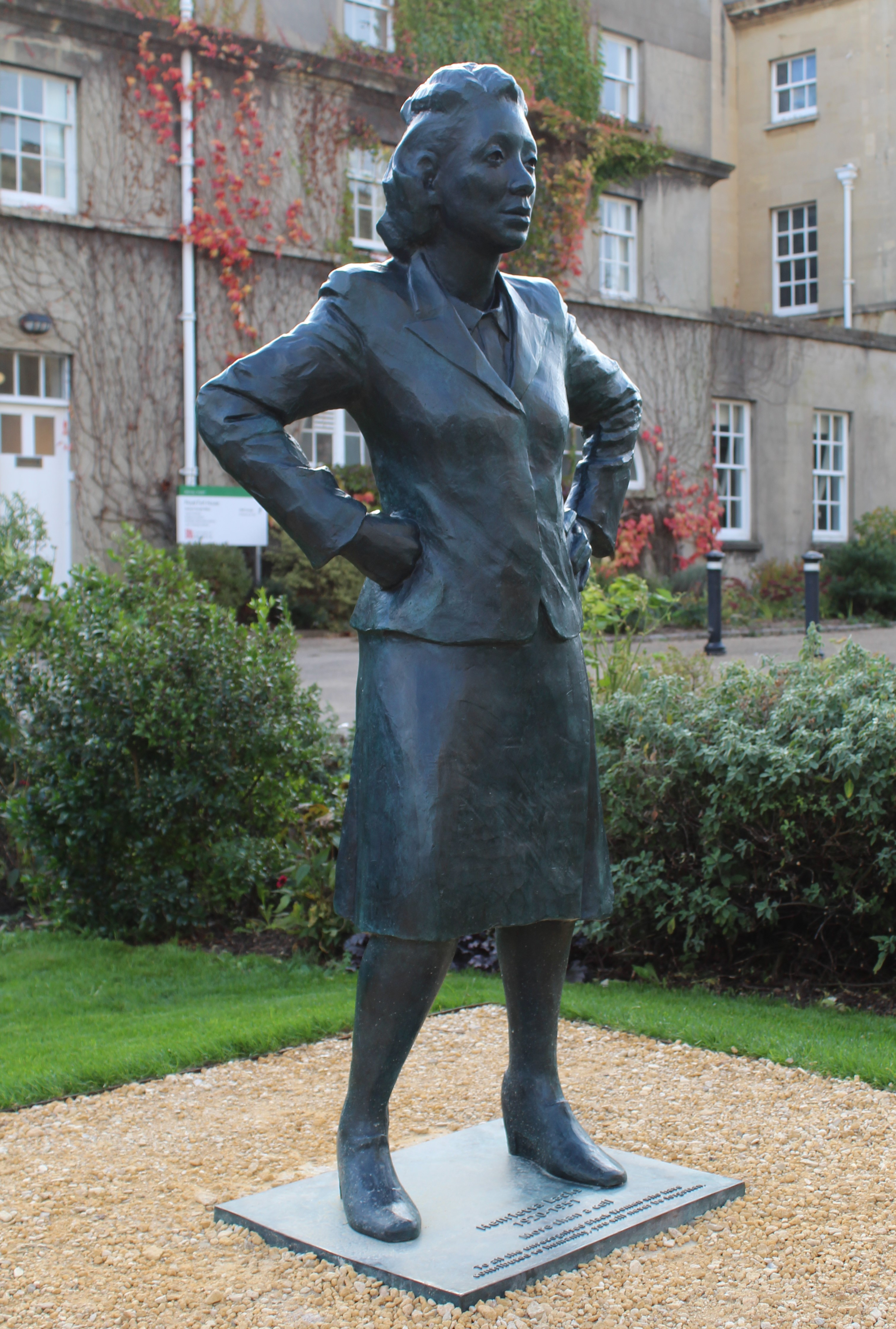
Henrietta Lacks statue, Bristol

In 2020, Lacks was inducted into the National Women's Hall of Fame.

In 2021, the Henrietta Lacks Enhancing Cancer Research Act of 2019 became law; it states the Government Accountability Office must complete a study about barriers to participation that exist in cancer clinical trials that are federally funded for populations that have been underrepresented in such trials.

In October 2021, the University of Bristol unveiled a statue of Lacks at Royal Fort House in the city. The sculpture was created by Helen Wilson-Roe and was the first statue of a black woman made by a black woman for a public space in the United Kingdom.

On October 13, 2021, the World Health Organization (WHO) presented the Director General Award to Lawrence Lacks, the son of Henrietta Lacks, in recognition of her unknowing contribution to science and medicine. Soumya Swaminathan, chief scientist at the WHO, said: "I cannot think of any other single cell line or lab reagent that's been used to this extent and has resulted in so many advances."

On March 15, 2022, United States Rep. Kwesi Mfume (D-Md) filed legislation to posthumously award the Congressional Gold Medal to Henrietta Lacks for her distinguished contributions to science. The award is one of the most prestigious civilian honors given by the United States government.

On December 19, 2022, it was announced that a bronze statue honoring Henrietta Lacks would be erected in Roanoke, Virginia's Henrietta Lacks Plaza, previously named Lee Plaza after Confederate General Robert E. Lee. A statue of Lee was removed from the site in the wake of the protests following the murder of George Floyd in 2020. The Lacks statue was unveiled on October 4, 2023.

On June 13, 2023, Loudoun County Public Schools Board members approved naming a new school Henrietta Lacks Elementary School in Aldie, Virginia. The school serves more than 800 students from preschool through 2nd grade and opened in August 2024.

=== In popular culture ===
The question of how and whether her race affected her treatment, the lack of obtaining consent, and her relative obscurity continues to be controversial. In the medical world, this case brings up bioethical concerns with informed consent, medical records privacy, and communication with tissue donors and research participants.

The HeLa cell line's connection to Henrietta Lacks was first brought to popular attention in March 1976 with a pair of articles in the Detroit Free Press and Rolling Stone written by reporter Michael Rogers, though Rogers erroneously states her name as Helen Lane. In 1998, Adam Curtis directed a BBC documentary about Henrietta Lacks called The Way of All Flesh.

Rebecca Skloot documented extensive histories of both the HeLa cell line and the Lacks family in two articles published in 2000 and 2001 and in her 2010 book The Immortal Life of Henrietta Lacks. Skloot worked with Deborah Lacks, who was determined to learn more about her mother, on the book. She used her first royalty check from the book to start the Henrietta Lacks Foundation, which has provided funds like college tuition and medical procedures for Henrietta's family.

HBO announced in 2010 that Oprah Winfrey and Alan Ball were developing a film project based on Skloot's book, and in 2016 filming commenced. with Winfrey in the leading role of Deborah Lacks, Henrietta's daughter. The film The Immortal Life of Henrietta Lacks was released in 2017, with Renée Elise Goldsberry portraying Lacks. Sons David Lacks Jr. and Zakariyya Rahman and granddaughter Jeri Lacks were consultants for the film.

HBO also commissioned Kadir Nelson for an oil painting of Lacks. In 2018, the portrait was jointly acquired by the National Museum of African American History and Culture and the Smithsonian's National Portrait Gallery. The wallpaper in the painting is made up of the "Flower of Life" alluding to the immortality of her cells. The flowers on her dress resemble images of cell structures, and the two missing buttons on her dress symbolize her cells taken without permission.

NBC's Law & Order aired its own fictionalized version of Lacks's story in the 2010 episode "Immortal", which Slate referred to as "shockingly close to the true story" and the musical groups Jello Biafra and the Guantanamo School of Medicine and Yeasayer both released songs about Henrietta Lacks and her legacy.

Members of the Lacks family wrote their own stories for the first time in 2013, when Lacks's oldest son and his wife, Lawrence and Bobbette Lacks, wrote a short digital memoir called "Hela Family Stories: Lawrence and Bobbette", with first-hand accounts of their memories of Henrietta Lacks while she was alive and of their own efforts to keep the youngest children out of unsafe living environments following their mother's death.

The HeLa Project, a multimedia exhibition to honor Lacks, opened in 2017 in Baltimore at the Reginald F. Lewis Museum of Maryland African American History & Culture. It included a portrait by Kadir Nelson and a poem by Saul Williams.

HeLa, a play by Chicago playwright J. Nicole Brooks, was commissioned by Sideshow Theatre Company in 2016, with a public staged reading on July 31, 2017. The play was produced by Sideshow at Chicago's Greenhouse Theater Center from November 18 to December 23, 2018. The play uses Lacks's life story as a jumping point for a larger conversation about Afrofuturism, scientific progress, and bodily autonomy.

In the series El Ministerio del Tiempo, the immortality of her cells in the lab is cited as the precedent for the character Arteche's "extreme resistance to infections, to injuries, and to cellular degeneration. In other words to aging": that his cells are immortal.

In the Netflix original movie Project Power (2020), the case of Henrietta Lacks is cited by one of the villains of the story as an example of unwilling trials giving rise to advances for the greater good.

The JJ Doom album Key to the Kuffs (2012) includes the song "Winter Blues" that contains the lyrics "We could live forever like Henrietta Lacks cells".

Yeasayer wrote a song about Lacks, entitled "Henrietta," for their 2012 album Fragrant World.

In 2020, playwright Sandra Seaton wrote a one-woman piece titled Call Me By My Name, focusing on Henrietta Lacks. The piece was performed by actress Tracey Bonner at that year's Atlanta Black Theatre Festival, depicting Lacks discussing her life and the impact she had on science, eventually demanding that people 'call me by my name' when referencing the breakthroughs made possible by the study of the tumors that ended her life.

== See also ==
- List of contaminated cell lines
- Moore v. Regents of the University of California
- History of medicine in the United States
