= The Immortal Life of Henrietta Lacks =

2010 book by Rebecca Skloot

- First edition
- Author: Rebecca Skloot
- Language: English
- Genre: Nonfiction
- Publisher: Crown
- Publication date: February 2, 2010
- Publication place: United States
- Media type: Print (Hardback)
- Pages: 381
- ISBN: 978-1-4000-5217-2

The Immortal Life of Henrietta Lacks (2010) is a non-fiction book by American author Rebecca Skloot. It was the 2011 winner of the National Academies Communication Award for best creative work that helps the public understanding of topics in science, engineering or medicine.

== About ==
The book is about Henrietta Lacks and the immortal cell line, known as HeLa, that came from Lacks's cervical cancer cells in 1951. Skloot became interested in Lacks after a biology teacher referenced her but knew little about her. Skloot began conducting extensive research on her and worked with Lacks' family to create the book. The book is notable for its science writing and dealing with ethical issues of race and class in medical research. Skloot said that some of the information was taken from the journal of Deborah Lacks, Henrietta Lacks's daughter, as well as from "archival photos and documents, scientific and historical research." It is Skloot's first book.

== Editions ==
The book was originally licensed for publication in 2001 by the W.H. Freeman trade division, but within a few weeks of the contract signing, parent company Holtzbrinck/Macmillan shuttered the imprint, and the contract was handed over to their Henry Holt imprint where a sales director and an editor summarily canceled the contract. This shortsighted decision is immortalized in the movie. It took Skloot years to find new representation and a new publisher.

The book was initially released in hardcover, published by Crown, on February 2, 2010. On the same date, an audiobook edition was published by Random House Audio, narrated by Casandra Campbell and Bahni Turpin, as well as electronic editions in mobile (Kindle) and EPUB formats. A paperback edition was published by Broadway Books on March 8, 2011. It has also been translated into more than 25 foreign language editions.

== Reception ==
=== Awards ===
The book was awarded the National Academies Best Book of the Year Award, the American Association for the Advancement of Science's Young Adult Science Book award, and the Wellcome Trust Book Prize, awarded annually to an outstanding work of fiction or non-fiction on the theme of health and medicine. It also won the Heartland Prize for non-fiction, among others, including a Salon Book Award, and a 100 New York Times Notable Books of the Year. The paperback edition had spent 75 weeks on the New York Times Best Seller list.

=== Critical reception ===
Critical reception was largely favorable. It was named a best book of the year by more than 60 media outlets, including New York Times, Oprah, NPR, and Entertainment Weekly.

Lisa Margonelli wrote:

Skloot narrates the science lucidly, tracks the racial politics of medicine thoughtfully and tells the Lacks family’s often painful history with grace. She also confronts the spookiness of the cells themselves, intrepidly crossing into the spiritual plane on which the family has come to understand their mother’s continued presence in the world. Science writing is often just about “the facts.” Skloot’s book, her first, is far deeper, braver and more wonderful.

Dwight Garner of The New York Times wrote:

I put down Rebecca Skloot’s first book, The Immortal Life of Henrietta Lacks, more than once. Ten times, probably. Once to poke the fire. Once to silence a pinging BlackBerry. And eight times to chase my wife and assorted visitors around the house, to tell them I was holding one of the most graceful and moving nonfiction books I’ve read in a very long time …It has brains and pacing and nerve and heart.

Hilary Mantel writes: "Rebecca Skloot revivifies Henrietta, studying her not only as the originator of her cell line but as a woman embedded in history. Her absorbing book is not just about medicine and science but about colour, race, class, superstition and enlightenment, about the painful, transfixing romance of being American. ... it is a fascinating, harrowing and necessary book.

One reviewer for The New Atlantis, while mostly positive about the book, questioned its ethical arguments about tissue markets and informed consent involving scientists such as Chester M. Southam, and claimed to have found factual errors: one related to the role of HeLa cells in early space missions, and, another related to a statement in the book that says "if all HeLa cells ever grown could have been gathered on a scale, their total weight would have measured more than 50 million metric tons." Skloot addresses this question on her website, where she explains how the 50 million metric tons figure was calculated, saying "That calculation was based on the way HeLa cells are known to divide (specifically how often they double their numbers) and the amount of time they’d been alive at the time the calculation was made." She clarifies that "it was a hypothetical calculation because that many cells couldn’t have been saved and put on a scale." She also says that the figures "were verified before the book went to press by the scientists who did the original calculations, and outside experts."

=== Controversy ===
In September 2015, schools in Knox County, Tennessee were faced with demands from a parent that the book be removed from Knox County classrooms and libraries; the parent in question alleged that the scene in which Lacks discovered her tumor was depicted in a "pornographic" way.

=== Academic reception ===
The book was adopted as a common reading text at more than 125 universities and was widely taught in high school, undergraduate, graduate and doctoral classrooms.

Sonia Shaw wrote, "It's a heartbreaking story, beautifully rendered".

== In other media ==
=== Film ===
In 2010, it was announced that a television film project based on the book was in development. Oprah Winfrey and Alan Ball were teaming together to bring the biopic to HBO. HBO began production on the film in the summer of 2016. Winfrey executive-produced and starred as Deborah, the daughter of Henrietta Lacks. George C. Wolfe wrote and directed the film. Lacks' sons and granddaughter were planned to serve as consultants. The film aired in 2017.

In Annihilation, a 2018 film which involves cell mutation, Lena, a biologist, (Natalie Portman) reads The Immortal Life of Henrietta Lacks.

== See also ==
- Crownsville Hospital Center, Elsie's asylum
- Clover, Virginia, Henrietta's home town
- Dundalk, Maryland, location of Turners Station in Baltimore
