= HeLa =

Oldest cultured human cell line (1951)

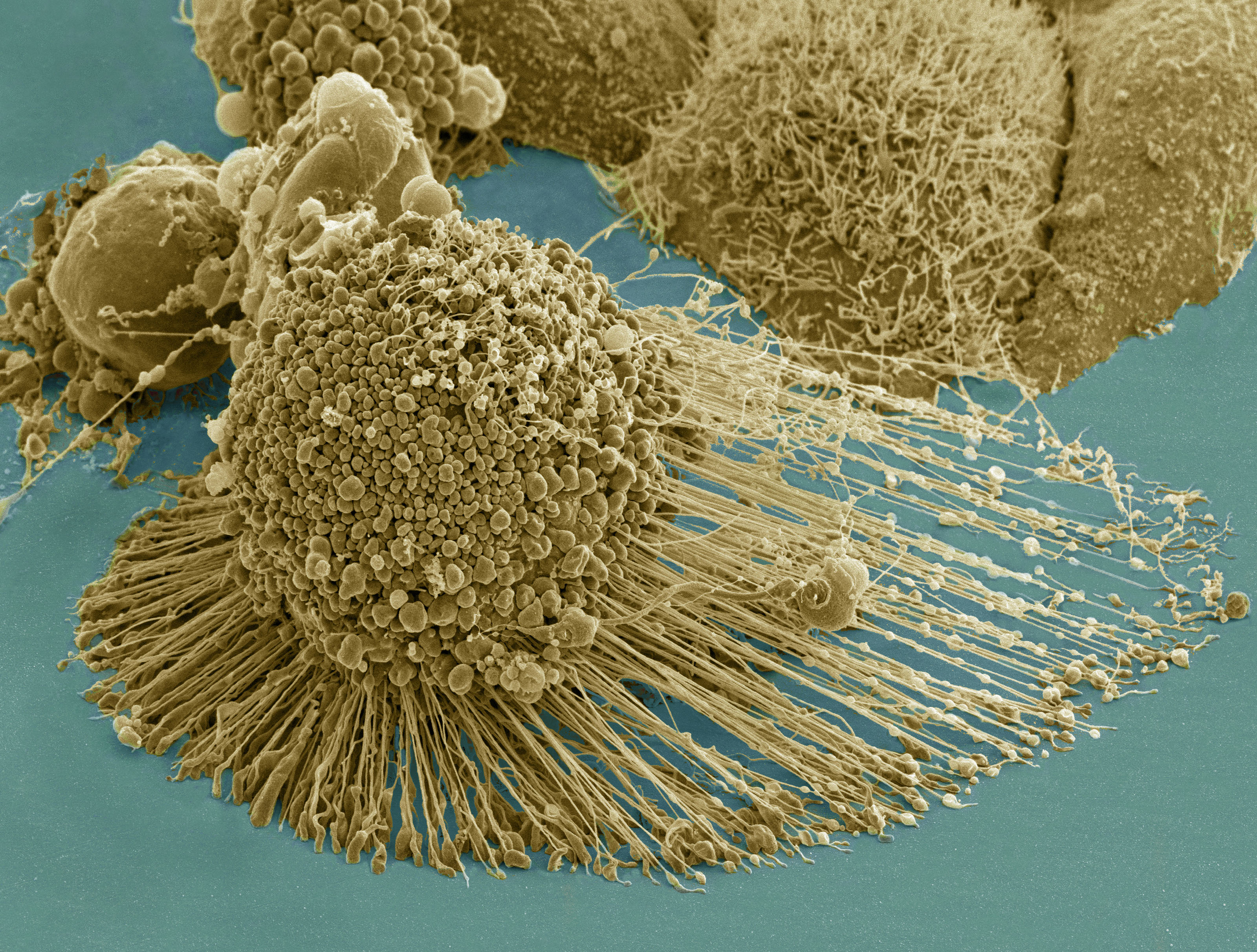
Scanning electron micrograph of a HeLa cell undergoing apoptosis. (photo taken with Zeiss Merlin HR-SEM).

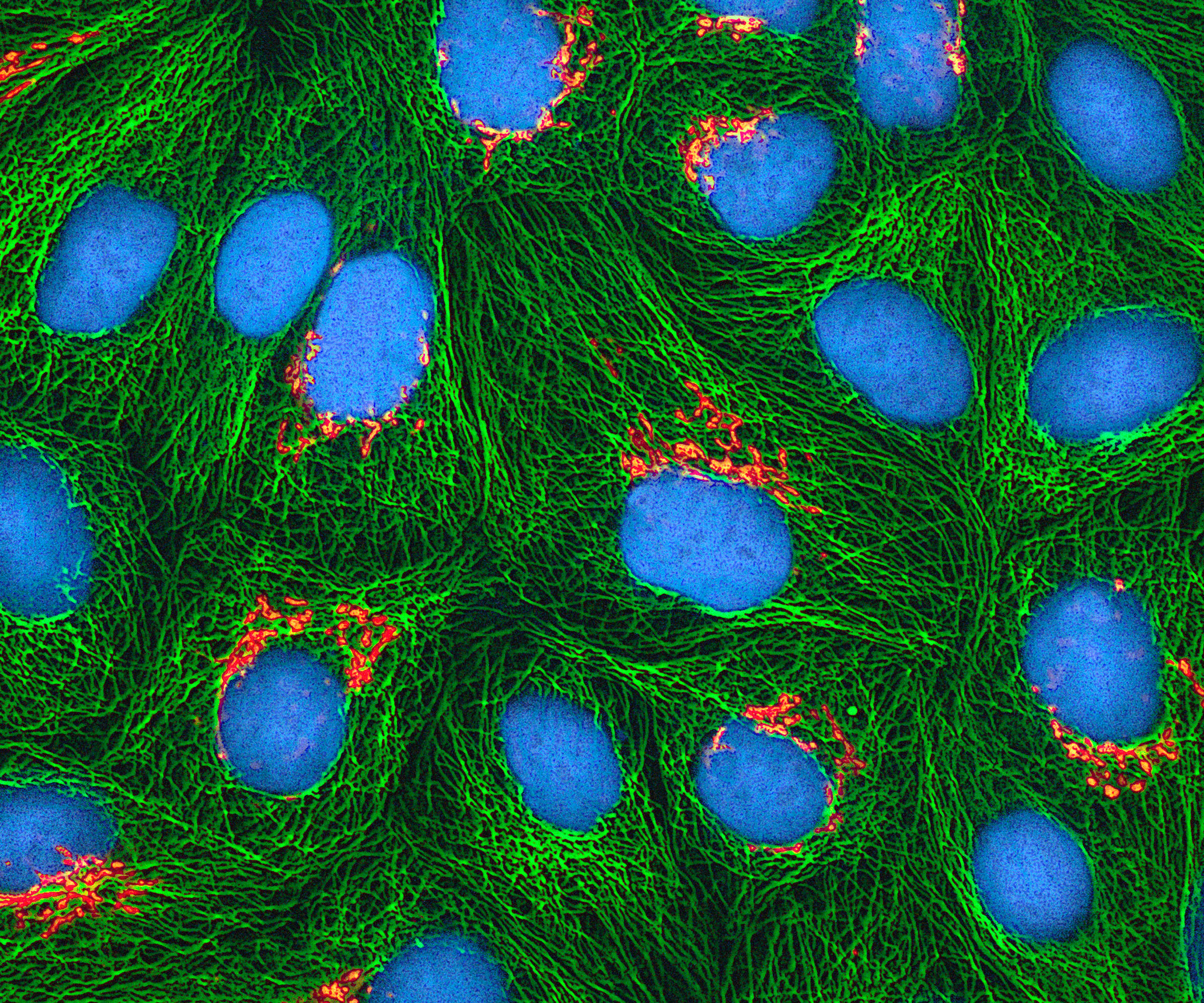
Multiphoton fluorescence image of cultured HeLa cells with a fluorescent protein targeted to the Golgi apparatus (orange), microtubules (green) and counterstained for DNA (cyan). (photo taken via Nikon RTS2000MP custom laser scanning microscope).

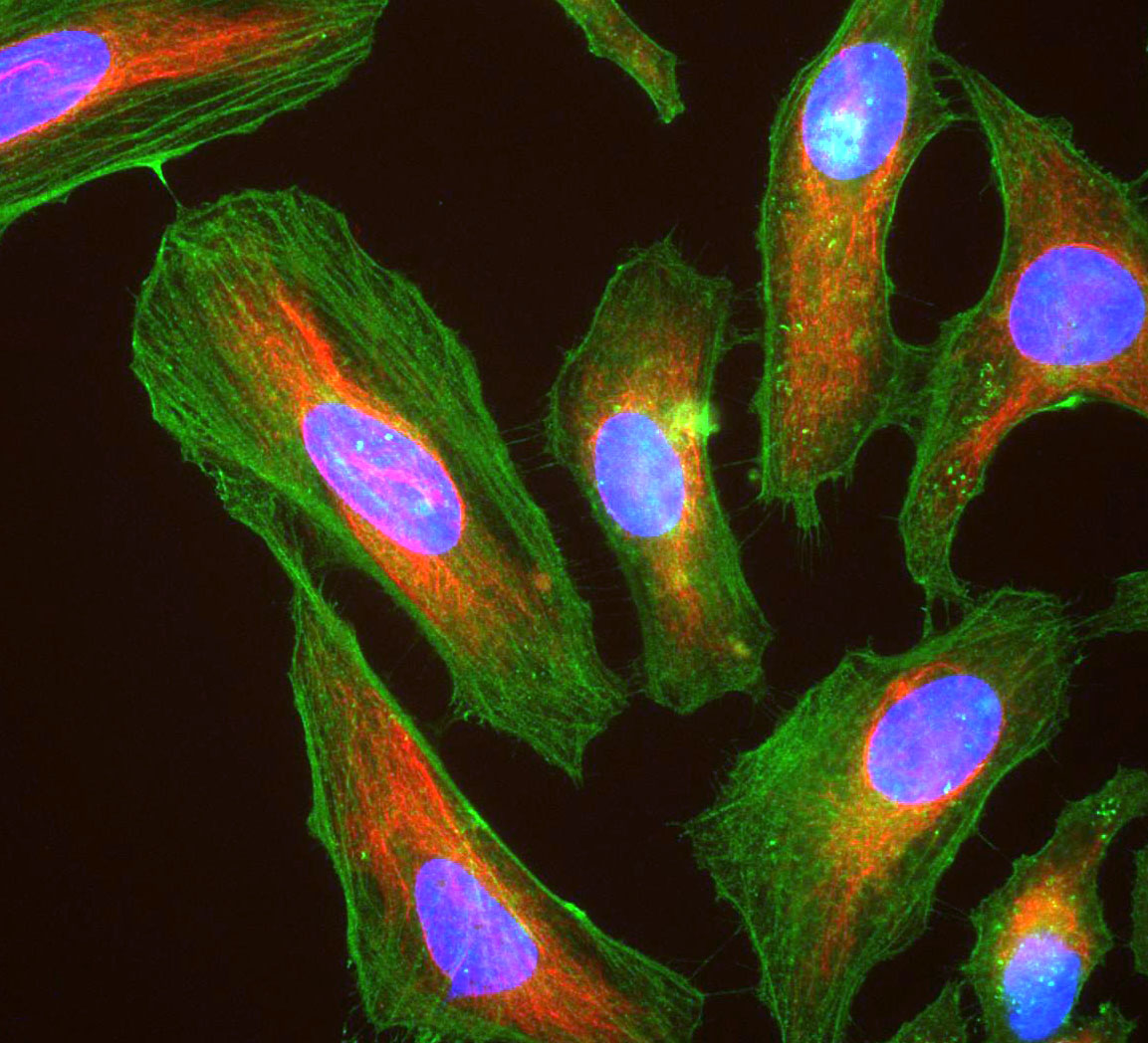
Immunofluorescence image of HeLa cells grown in tissue culture and stained with antibody to actin in green, vimentin in red and DNA in blue

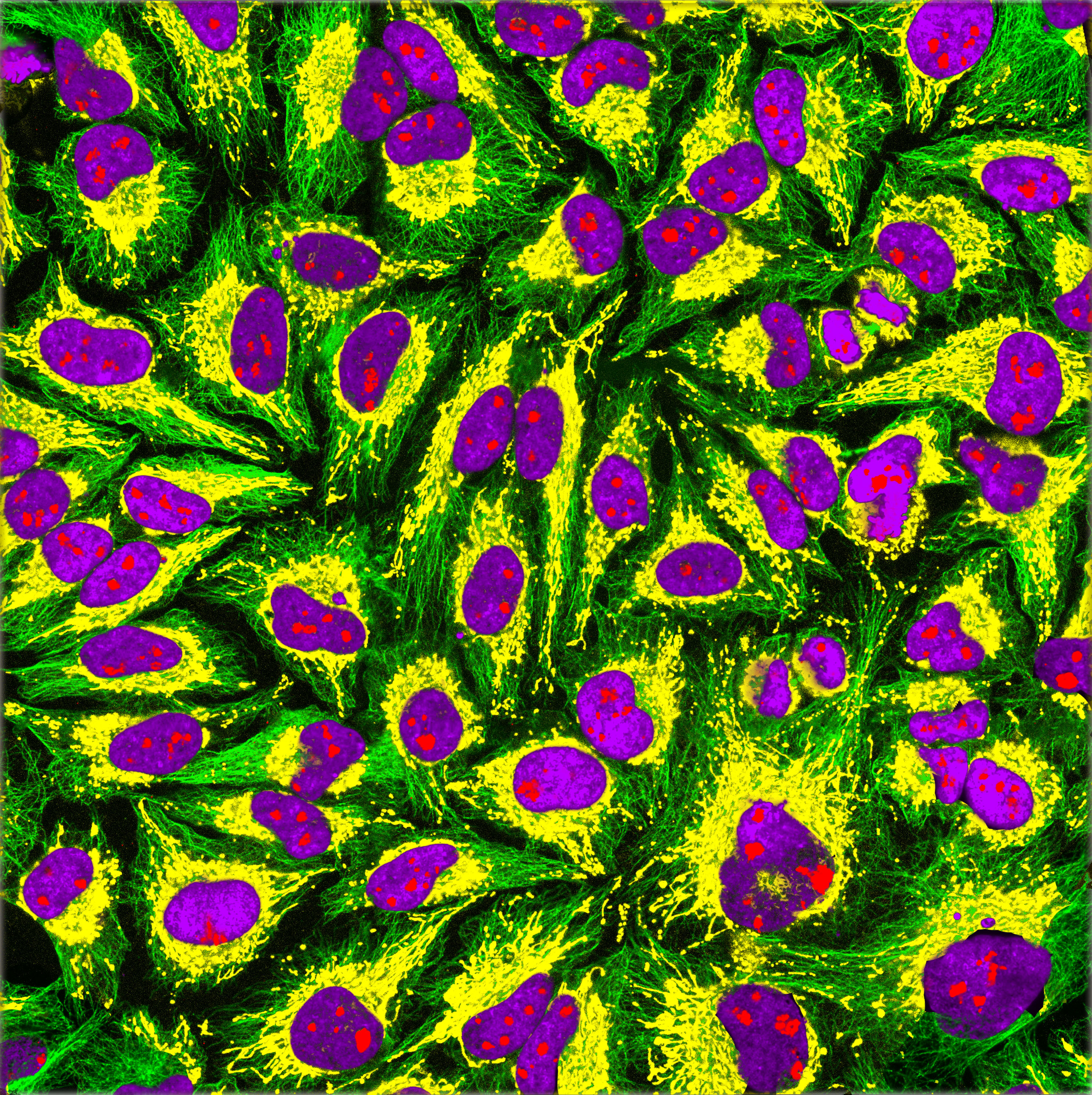
Immunofluorescence of HeLa cells showing microtubules in green, mitochondria in yellow, nucleoli in red and nuclear DNA in purple

The HeLa (/ˈhiːlɑː/) Cell Line is an immortalized cell line used in biological experimentation and research. It is the oldest human cell line and one of the most commonly used. HeLa cells are durable and prolific, allowing for extensive applications in scientific study. The cell line is derived from cervical cancer cells extracted from the tumorous mass of Henrietta Lacks, a 31-year-old African-American woman at the time, without patient notification or consent; this had occurred on February 8, 1951. The cell line is named for her ('He' for "Henrietta", 'La' for "Lacks"). Lacks died of cervical cancer on October 4, 1951.

Extracting portions of biological tissues from patients without permission or knowledge for research use or storage was common practice in the United States at the time. Cell biologist George Otto Gey developed Lacks's cell line upon noticing that her adenocarcinoma cells were particularly easy to be kept alive and multiply. Previously, cells cultured from other human cells would survive for only a few days, but cells from Lacks's tumor behaved differently, living for a very long time.

== History ==
=== Origin ===
In 1951, Henrietta Lacks was admitted to the Johns Hopkins Hospital with symptoms of irregular vaginal bleeding; she was subsequently treated for cervical cancer. Her original tumor, initially diagnosed as an epidermoid (squamous cell) carcinoma, was later reclassified as an adenocarcinoma of the cervix. Her first treatment was performed by Lawrence Wharton Jr., who at that time collected tissue samples from her cervix without her consent. Her cervical biopsy supplied samples of tissue for clinical evaluation and research by George Otto Gey, head of the Tissue Culture Laboratory. Gey's lab assistant Mary Kubicek used the roller-tube technique to culture the cells. It was observed that the cells grew robustly, doubling every 20–24 hours, unlike previous specimens, which died out.

The cells were propagated by George Gey shortly before Lacks died from her carcinoma in 1951. Lacks's cancer cells proved to be the first human cell line to live successfully in vitro, which was a scientific achievement with profound future benefit to medical research. George Gey freely donated the progeny of her cancerous cells, along with the tools and processes that his lab developed, to any scientist requesting them, simply for the benefit of science. Neither Lacks nor her family gave permission to harvest the cells.

The cells were later commercialized, although never patented in their original form. There was no requirement at that time to inform patients or their relatives about such matters, because discarded material or material obtained during surgery, diagnosis, or therapy was considered the property of the physician or the medical institution.

As was customary for George Gey's lab assistant, the culture was named after the first two letters of Henrietta Lacks' first and last names, He and La. Before a 1973 query printed in the journal Nature obtained her real name, the "HeLa" cell line was incorrectly attributed to a "Helen Lane" or "Helen Larson". The origin of this obfuscation is unclear.

In 1973, staff at Johns Hopkins discovered that HeLa cells could travel through the air and easily contaminate other cell cultures. When staff at Johns Hopkins realized this, a staff physician contacted the Lacks family and sought DNA samples to help identify which non-HeLa cultures were contaminated with HeLa cells. The family never understood the purpose of the visit, but they were distressed by their understanding of what the researchers told them. These cells are treated as cancer cells, as they are descended from a biopsy taken from a visible lesion on the cervix as part of Lacks's diagnosis of cancer.

HeLa cells, like other cell lines, are termed "immortal" because they can divide an unlimited number of times in a laboratory cell culture plate, as long as fundamental cell survival conditions are met (i.e. being maintained and sustained in a suitable environment). There are many strains of HeLa cells, because they mutate during division in cell cultures, but all HeLa cells are descended from the same tumor cells removed from Lacks. The total number of HeLa cells that have been propagated in cell culture far exceeds the total number of cells that were in Henrietta Lacks's body.

=== Controversy ===
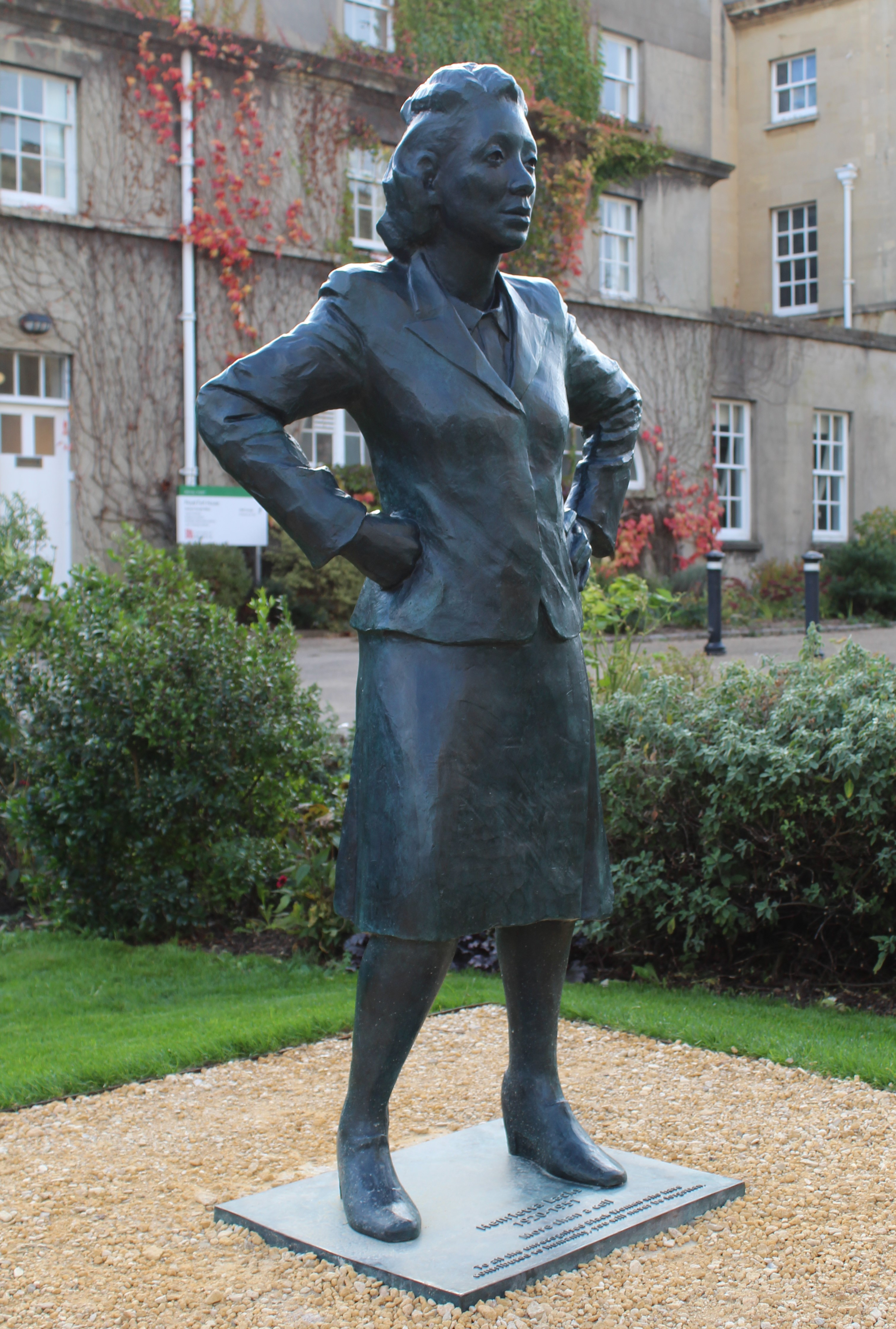
Statue of Henrietta Lacks unveiled October 2021 at Royal Fort House, Bristol

Lacks's case is one of many examples of the lack of informed consent in 20th-century medicine. Communication between tissue donors and doctors was virtually nonexistent—cells were taken without patient consent, and patients were not told what the cells would be used for. Johns Hopkins Hospital, where Lacks received treatment and had her tissue harvested, was the only hospital in the Baltimore area where African American patients could receive free care. The patients who received free care from this segregated sect of the hospital often became research subjects without their knowledge. Lacks' family also had no access to her patient files and had no say in who received HeLa cells or what they would be used for. Additionally, as HeLa cells were popularized and used more frequently throughout the scientific community, Lacks' relatives received no financial benefit and continued to live with limited access to healthcare.

This issue of who owns tissue samples taken for research was brought up in the Supreme Court of California case of Moore v. Regents of the University of California in 1990. The court ruled that a person's discarded tissue and cells are not his or her property and can be commercialized.

Lacks's case influenced the establishment of the Common Rule in 1991. The Common Rule enforces informed consent by ensuring that doctors inform patients if they plan to use any details of the patient's case in research and give them the choice of disclosing the details or not. Tissues connected to their donors' names are also strictly regulated under this rule, and samples are no longer named using donors' initials, but rather by code numbers. To further resolve the issue of patient privacy, Johns Hopkins established a joint committee with the NIH and several of Lacks's family members to determine who receives access to Henrietta Lacks's genome.

In 2021, Henrietta Lacks's estate sued to get past and future payments for the alleged unauthorized and widely known sale of HeLa cells by Thermo Fisher Scientific. Lacks's family hired an attorney to seek compensation from upwards of 100 pharmaceutical companies that have used and profited from HeLa cells. Settlement of the suit with Thermo Fisher Scientific was announced in August 2023, with undisclosed terms. Novartis, a company that developed hundreds of patents using HeLa cells, settled in 2026. As of March 2026, lawsuits against Ultragenyx and Viatris are still pending.

== Use in research ==
HeLa cells were the first human cells to be successfully cloned in 1955, by Theodore Puck and Philip I. Marcus at the University of Colorado, Denver. Since then, HeLa cells have "continually been used for research into cancer, AIDS, the effects of radiation and toxic substances, gene mapping, and countless other scientific pursuits." According to author Rebecca Skloot, by 2009, "more than 60,000 scientific articles had been published about research done on HeLa [cells], and that number was increasing steadily at a rate of more than 300 papers each month."

The many different sublineages of HeLa cells have each developed their own characteristics and can yield different results in the same experiment. As a result researchers should be specific about the lineage and batch used.

=== Polio eradication ===
HeLa cells were used by Jonas Salk to test the first polio vaccine in the 1950s. They were observed to be easily infected by the poliomyelitis virus, causing infected cells to die. This made HeLa cells highly desirable for polio vaccine testing, since results could be easily obtained. A large volume of HeLa cells were needed for the testing of Salk's polio vaccine, prompting the National Foundation for Infantile Paralysis (NFIP) to find a facility capable of mass-producing HeLa cells. In the spring of 1953, a cell culture factory was established at Tuskegee University to supply Salk and other labs with HeLa cells. Less than a year later, Salk's vaccine was ready for human trials.

=== Virology ===
HeLa cells have been used in testing how parvovirus infects cells of humans, dogs, and cats. These cells have also been used to study viruses such as the oropouche virus (OROV). OROV causes disruption of cells in culture; the cells start to degenerate shortly after they are infected, causing viral induction of apoptosis. HeLa cells have been used to study expression of the papillomavirus E2 and apoptosis. HeLa cells have also been used to study the ability of the canine distemper virus to induce apoptosis in cancer cell lines, which could play an important role in developing treatments for tumor cells resistant to radiation and chemotherapy.

Over the years, HeLa cells have been infected with various types of viruses, including HIV, Zika, mumps, and herpes viruses to test and develop new vaccines and drugs. Dr. Richard Axel discovered that the addition of the CD4 protein to HeLa cells enabled them to be infected with HIV, allowing the virus to be studied. In 1979, scientists learned that the measles virus constantly mutates when it infects HeLa cells, and in 2019 they found that Zika cannot multiply in HeLa cells.

HeLa cells have also been instrumental in the recognition of human papillomavirus infection as a precursor to cervical cancer. In the 1980s, Harald zur Hausen found that HeLa cells contained HPV-18, which was later found to be the cause of the aggressive cancer that had killed her. His work in linking HPV with cervical cancer won him a Nobel Prize. This discovery led to the use of HPV tests to identify those at high risk of developing cervical cancer and the development of HPV vaccines to prevent the cancer-causing infection. Populations that have received the vaccine consistently show much lower rates of cervical cancer with a reduction of 90% among those who received the vaccine before 17 years of age. In low- and middle-income countries, 11.24 deaths are prevented per 1,000 HPV-vaccinated people, the highest for all analyzed vaccines..

=== Cancer ===
HeLa cells have been used in a number of cancer studies, including those involving sex steroid hormones, such as estradiol and other estrogens, and estrogen receptors, along with estrogen-like compounds, such as quercetin, which has cancer-reducing properties. There have also been studies on HeLa cells, involving the effects of flavonoids and antioxidants with estradiol on cancer cell proliferation.

In 2012, HeLa cells were used in tests of novel heptamethine dyes IR-808 and other analogues, which are currently being explored for their unique uses in medical diagnostics, the individualized treatment of cancer patients with the aid of PDT, co-administration with other drugs, and irradiation. HeLa cells have been used in research involving fullerenes to induce apoptosis as a part of photodynamic therapy, as well as in in vitro cancer research using cell lines. HeLa cells have also been used to define cancer markers in RNA, and have been used to establish an RNAi Based Identification System and Interference of Specific Cancer Cells.

In 2014, HeLa cells were shown to provide a viable cell line for tumor xenografts in C57BL/6 nude mice, and were subsequently used to examine the in vivo effects of fluoxetine and cisplatin on cervical cancer.

=== Genetics ===
In 1965, Henry Harris and John Watkins created the first human-animal hybrid by fusing HeLa cells with mouse Ehrlich ascites tumour cells. This enabled advances in mapping genes to specific chromosomes, which would eventually lead to the Human Genome Project.

=== Space biology ===
In the 1960s, HeLa cells were sent on one of the early satellite missions to determine the long term effects of space travel on living cells and tissues. Scientists discovered that HeLa cells divide more quickly in zero gravity.

== Analysis ==
=== Telomerase ===
The HeLa cell line was derived for use in cancer research. These cells proliferate abnormally rapidly, even compared with other cancer cells. Like many other cancer cells, HeLa cells have an active version of telomerase during cell division, which copies telomeres over and over again. This prevents the incremental shortening of telomeres that is implicated in aging and eventual cell death. In this way, the cells circumvent the Hayflick limit, which is the limited number of cell divisions that most normal cells can undergo before becoming senescent. This results in unlimited cell division and immortality.

=== Chromosome number ===
Horizontal gene transfer from human papillomavirus 18 (HPV18) to human cervical cells created the HeLa genome, which is different from Henrietta Lacks's genome in various ways, including the number of chromosomes. Cancer cells are rapidly-dividing and tend to have many chromosome variations, and HeLa is no exception. Roughly speaking, the HeLa karyotype contains 76–80 total chromosomes (making it "hypertriploid" since it's greater than the normal triploid number of 69), 22-25 of which are abnormal marker chromosomes (sometimes called "HeLa signature chromosomes"). Despite this great difference from the normal human karyotype, the HeLa genome has largely retained this karyotype ever since it went into cell culture. This suggests that the aberrations may be representative of advanced cervical carcinomas and were probably present in the primary tumor.

A 1999 study combined spectral karyotyping, FISH, and conventional cytogenetic techniques to produce a "comprehensive and definitive" characterization of the karyotypes of six HeLa CCL-2 cells from two subclones. Although most normal chromosomes are present in 2 copies, quite a few are present in 3 copies, and a few yet in 0 or 4 copies. The numbers vary between cells and subclones, indicating that the karyotype is not completely stable. The identities of all marker chromosomes were also elucidated down to the level of bands where possible. There is also variation in the presence and number of marker chromosomes. This work presented its results in the form of a table due to the many shared aberrations involved; if written using the International System for Human Cytogenomic Nomenclature karyotype notation, cell "A1" would be described as:

76<2n>,XX,+1,-3,-4,+6,+8,+10,+13,+14,+16,+17,+17,+21,+der(1)t(1;3)(q11;q11),+der(1;9)(p10;q10),+dup(2)(q?q?),+der(3;5)(p10;q10),+der(3;20)(q10;q?10),+der(5)t(5;22;8)(q11;q11q13;?),+i(5)(p10),+i(5)(p10),+i(5)(p10),+der(7)t(7;19)(q35;?),+der(16)t(7;16)(p21?;p11),+der(9)t(3;9)(p21;p11),+der(11)t(9;11;9)(?;p14?q22?;?)dup(11)(p?)dup(11)(q?),+der(12)t(3;12)(q21;q15),+i(15)(q10),+der(19)t(13;19)(q21;p13),+i(20)(q10),+der(22)t(8;22)(?;q13),+der(5;9)(p10;p10),+i(9)(p10)

As the "der" (derivative chromosome) notations indicate, most of the signature chromosomes are derived from multiple original chromosomes. HPV was found to have integrated onto 8q24 and two marker chromosomes containing this part of chromosome 8 (a der(5) and a der(22), underlined above).

The genome sequencing project of 2013 (for HeLa CCL-2) allowed the analysis of chromosome abnormalities down to the level of singular nucleotides. It also managed to resolve two haplotypes of each chromosome, so now scientists know not only how many copies of a chromosome there is, but also how many copies from each parent there is; this also applies to parts of a chromosome. For example, it turns out that HPV18 only integrated into the version of chromosome 8 from one parent and that only two-thirds of the HPV-18 genome had been present. Another genome sequencing project from 2013 dealt with the different HeLa Kyoto lineage. It did not resolve the haplotype but instead analyzed the transcriptome.

=== Complete genome sequence ===
The complete genome and transcriptome of the Kyoto strain of HeLa cells were sequenced and published on 11 March 2013, without the Lacks family's knowledge. Concerns were raised by the family, so the authors voluntarily withheld access to the sequence data. Jay Shendure led a HeLa (CCL-2 strain) sequencing project at the University of Washington, which resulted in a paper that had been accepted for publication in March 2013 – but that was also put on hold while the Lacks family's privacy concerns were addressed. On 7 August 2013, NIH director Francis Collins announced a policy of controlled access to the cell line genome, based on an agreement reached after three meetings with the Lacks family. A data-access committee will review requests from researchers for access to the genome sequence, under the criteria that the study is for medical research and that the users will abide by terms in the HeLa Genome Data Use Agreement, which includes that all NIH-funded researchers will deposit the data in a single database for future sharing. The committee consists of six members, including representatives from the medical, scientific, and bioethics fields, as well as two members of the Lacks family. In an interview, Collins praised the Lacks family's willingness to participate in a situation that was thrust upon them. He described the whole experience with them as "powerful," saying that it brought together "science, scientific history and ethical concerns" in a unique way. Shendure's haplotype-resolved genome and epigenome were published in August 2013.

Karyotypic, microarray, genomic, epigenomic, and transcriptomic data have allowed researchers to appreciate the scale and effect of the divergence among the many HeLa strains stored around the world's laboratories.

== Contamination ==
HeLa cells are sometimes difficult to control, because they adapt to growth in tissue culture plates and invade and outcompete other cell lines. Through improper maintenance, they have been known to contaminate other cell cultures in the same laboratory, interfering with biological research and forcing researchers to declare many results invalid. The degree of HeLa cell contamination among other cell types is unknown, because few researchers test the identity or purity of already established cell lines. It has been shown that a substantial fraction of in vitro cell lines are contaminated with HeLa cells; estimates range from 10% to 20%. This observation suggests that any cell line may be susceptible to a degree of contamination. Stanley Gartler (1967) and Walter Nelson-Rees (1975) were the first to publish on contamination of various cell lines by HeLa cells. Gartler noted that "with the continued expansion of cell culture technology, it is almost certain that both interspecific and intraspecific contamination will occur."

HeLa cell contamination has become a pervasive worldwide problem – affecting even the laboratories of many notable physicians, scientists, and researchers, including Jonas Salk. The HeLa contamination problem also contributed to Cold War tensions. The USSR and the USA had begun to cooperate in the war on cancer launched by President Richard Nixon, only to find that the exchanged cells were contaminated by HeLa.

Rather than focus on how to resolve the problem of HeLa cell contamination, many scientists and science writers continue to document this problem as simply a contamination issue – caused not by human error or shortcomings but by the hardiness, proliferation, or overpowering nature of HeLa cells. Recent data suggest that cross-contamination is still a major problem with modern cell cultures. The International Cell Line Authentication Committee (ICLAC) notes that many cases of cell line misidentification are the result of cross-contamination of the culture by another, faster-growing cell line. This calls into question the validity of the research done using contaminated cell lines, as certain attributes of the contaminant, which may come from an entirely different species or tissue, may be misattributed to the cell line under investigation.

HeLa cell cultures can be contaminated by Mycoplasma. Several species in this genus of bacteria can enter HeLa cells and adopt a parasitic lifestyle. Infection does not cause obvious mass death, but causes gross alternations in experimental results.

== New species proposal ==
HeLa cells were described by evolutionary biologist Leigh Van Valen as an example of the contemporary creation of a new species, dubbed Helacyton gartleri, owing to their ability to replicate indefinitely and their non-human number of chromosomes. The species was named after geneticist Stanley M. Gartler, whom Van Valen credits with discovering "the remarkable success of this species" (in the sense of having contaminated many other cell lines). His argument for speciation depends on these points:

- the chromosomal incompatibility of HeLa cells with human cells;
- the ecological niche of HeLa cells is different from that of humans;
- their ability to persist and expand well beyond the desires of human cultivators;
- their reproductive isolation from humans.

Van Valen proposed the new family Helacytidae and the genus Helacyton, and in the same paper proposed a new species for HeLa cells. However, this proposal was not taken seriously by other prominent evolutionary biologists, nor by scientists in other disciplines. Van Valen's argument that HeLa are a new species does not fulfill the criteria for an independent unicellular asexually reproducing species, because of the notorious instability of HeLa's karyotype and their lack of a strict ancestral-descendant lineage.

Duesberg et al. (2011) revisits the topic of cancer cell lines, speciation, and karyotypes. They argue that the cell lines have a karyotype with a level of flexibility that is "within stable margins" as selection for the ability to replicate autonomously weeds out severe aneuploidies. Large rearrangements become rare after the cancer has become established while small copy number changes continue to provide variation in the population, with copy numbers typically oscillating ±1. The karyotypic difference between regular HeLa and a lineage selected for puromycin resistance is an example of ±1 variation.

== Gallery ==
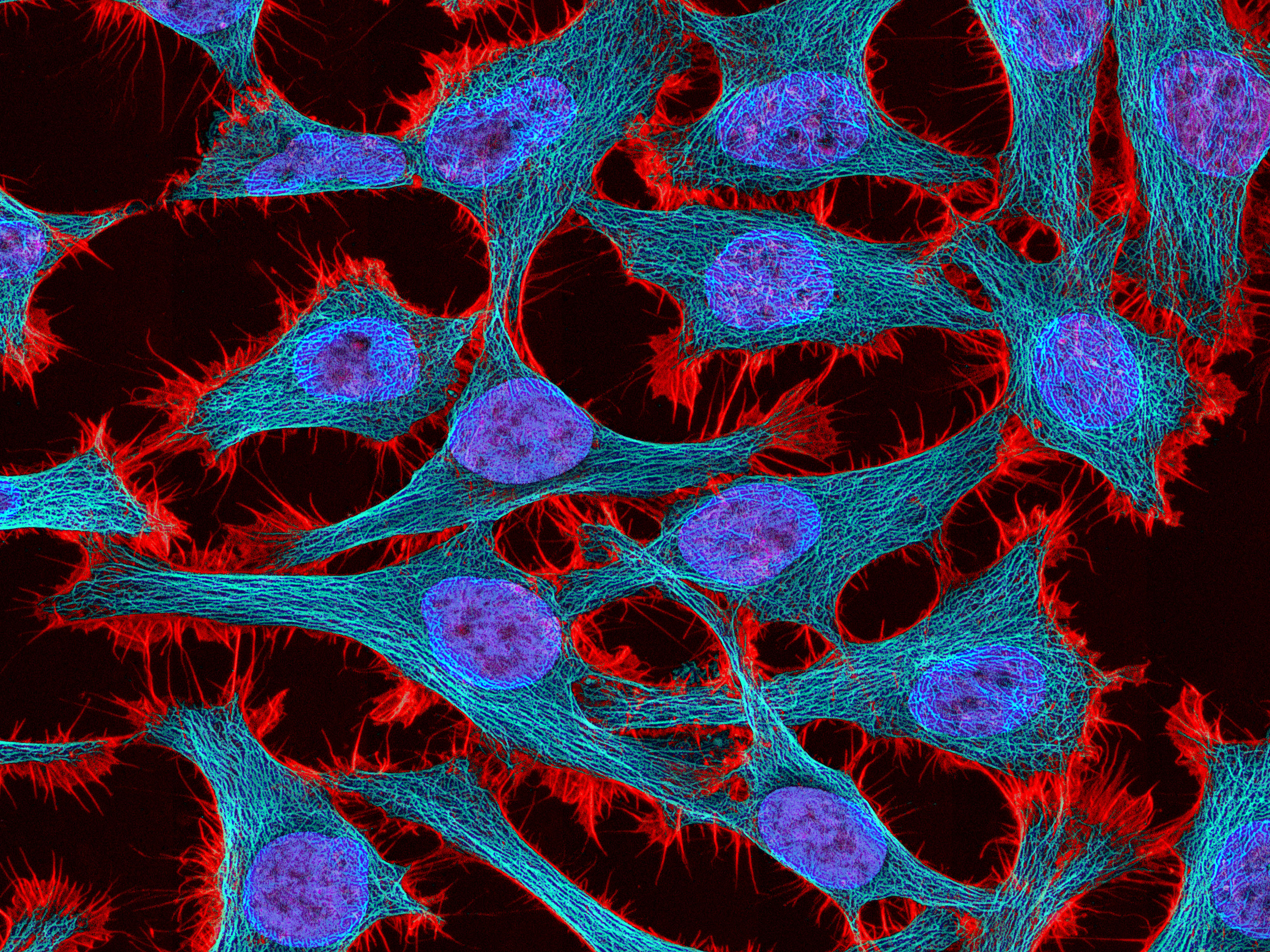
Multiphoton fluorescence image of HeLa cells stained with the actin- binding toxin phalloidin (red), microtubules (cyan), and cell nuclei (blue). Nikon RTS2000MP custom laser scanning microscope.

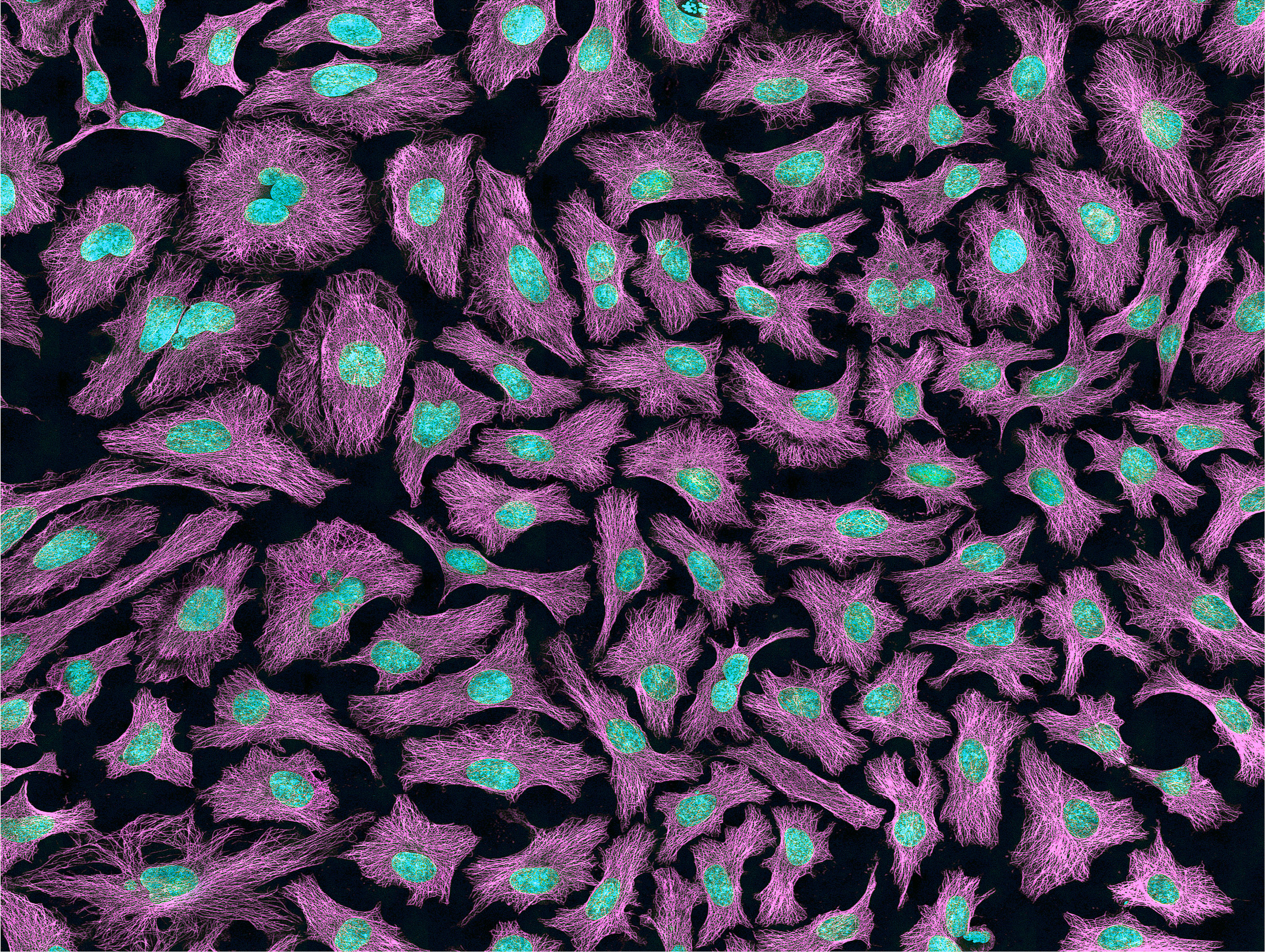
Multiphoton fluorescence image of HeLa cells with cytoskeletal microtubules (magenta) and DNA (cyan). Nikon RTS2000MP custom laser scanning microscope.

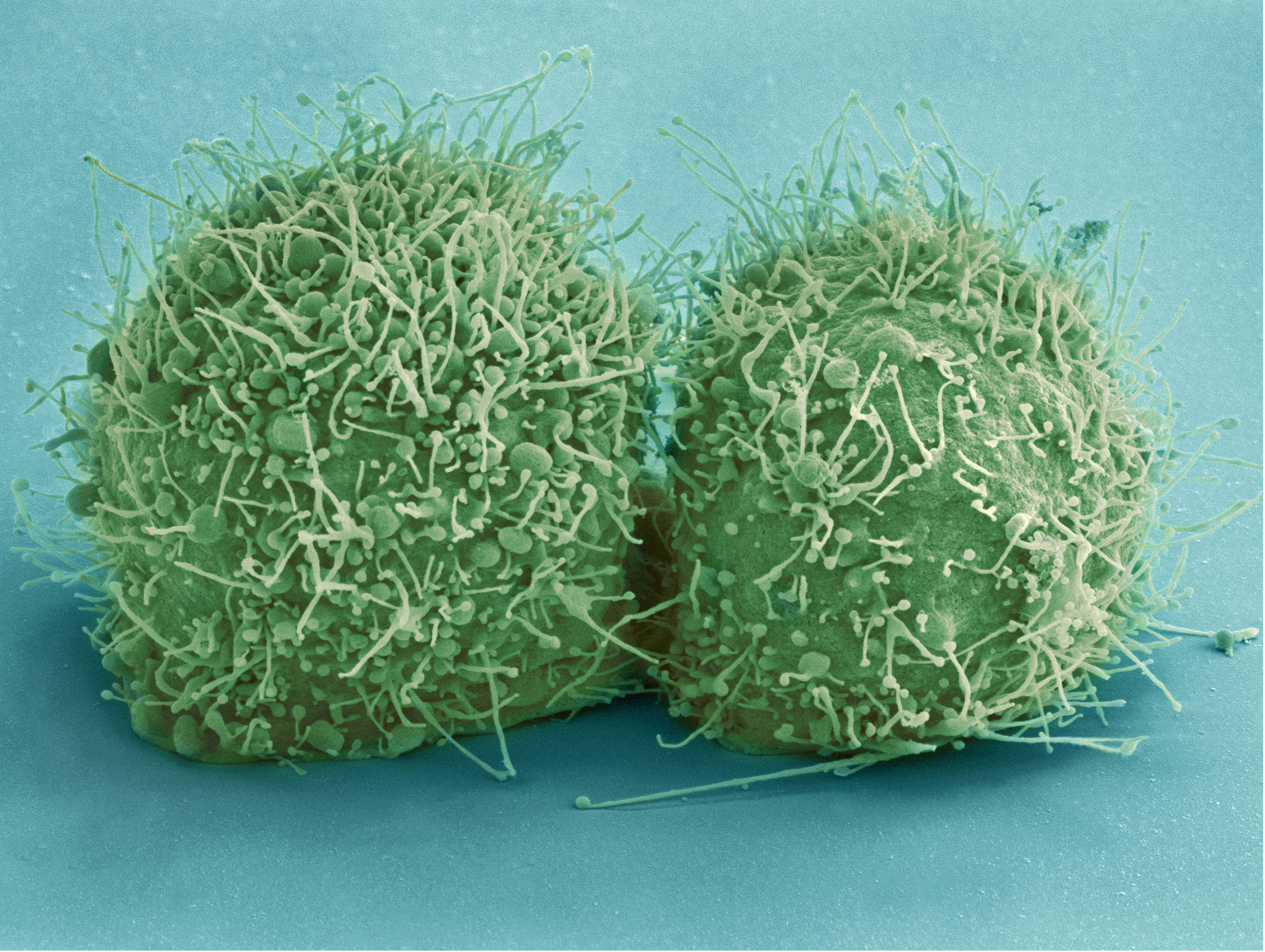
Scanning electron micrograph of just-divided HeLa cells. Zeiss Merlin HR-SEM.

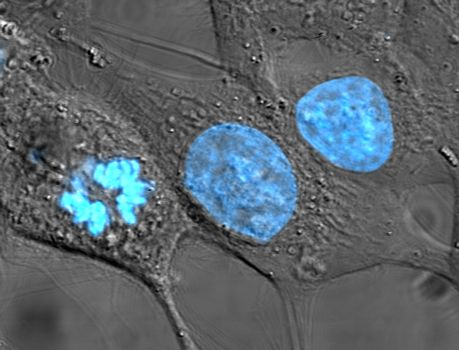
HeLa cells stained with Hoechst 33258

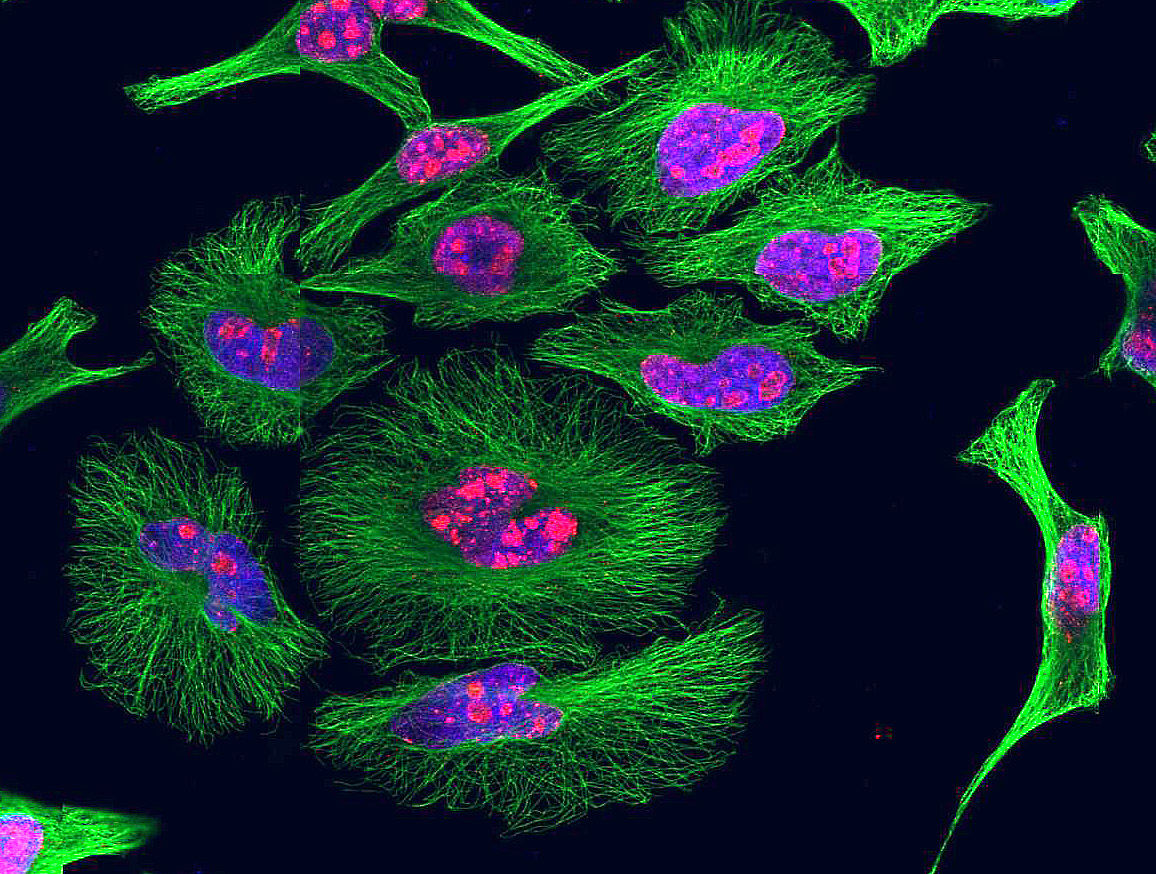
HeLa cells grown in culture and stained with antibody to tubulin (green), antibody to Ki-67 (red), and the blue DNA binding dye DAPI. The tubulin antibody shows the distribution of microtubules and the Ki-67 antibody is expressed in cells about to divide. Preparation, antibodies and image courtesy of EnCor Biotechnology.

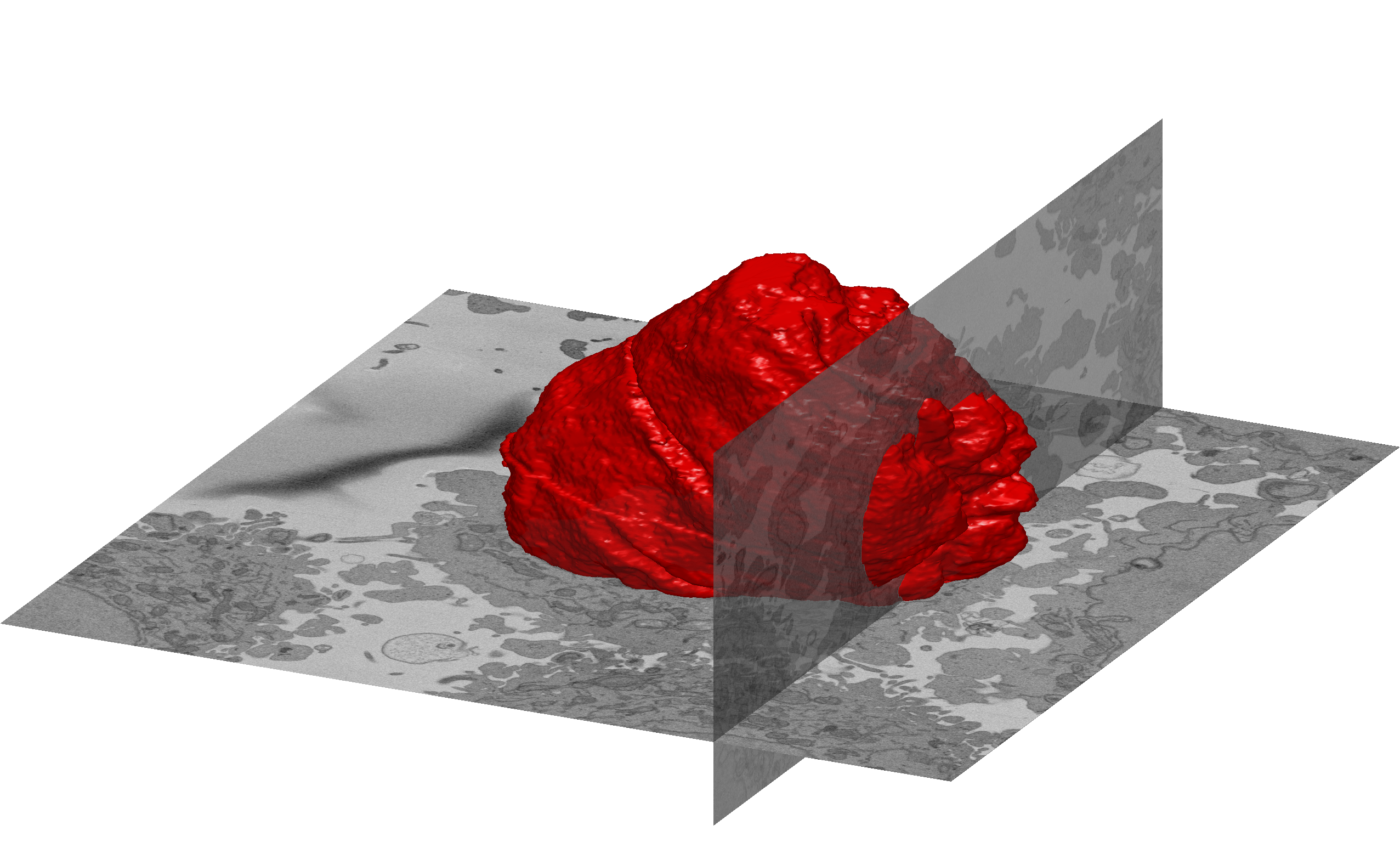
A volumetric surface render (red) of the nuclear envelope of one HeLa cell. The cell was observed in 300 slices on electron microscopy and the nuclear envelope was automatically segmented and rendered. One vertical and one horizontal slice are added for reference.

Plasma membrane and nuclear envelope of one Hela cell, displayed as a volumetric surface rendering. Left and centre: the plasma membrane in blue, with transparency, and the nuclear envelope in solid cyan. Right: the plasma membrane without transparency and the same angle of view as the centre picture. The membranes have been segmented from data acquired by electron microscopy.

== In media ==
- The 1997 documentary The Way of All Flesh by Adam Curtis explained the history of HeLa cells and their implications for medicine and society.
- A 2010 episode of Law & Order, "Immortal", was heavily based on the story of Henrietta Lacks and the HeLa cell line, using the fictional "NaRo" cells as a stand-in.
- The story of how the HeLa cell line came to be was also the subject of a 2010 episode of the podcast Radiolab.
- HeLa cells were the subject of a 2010 book by Rebecca Skloot, The Immortal Life of Henrietta Lacks, investigating the historical context of the cell line and how the Lacks family was involved in its use.
- A 2017 HBO film, The Immortal Life of Henrietta Lacks, was based on the book. The film starred Oprah Winfrey, Sylvia Grace Crim, and Rocky Carroll, with Renee Elise Goldsberry as Henrietta Lacks. Author Rebecca Skloot also appeared as a character in the film, portrayed by Rose Byrne.

== See also ==
- Clonally transmissible cancer
- Moore v. Regents of the University of California, case that set precedent for discarded tissue
- List of contaminated cell lines
- WI-38
- James Harrison (blood donor)
