= New American Press =

American not-for-profit literary press

- Founded: 2001; 24 years ago
- Headquarters: Milwaukee, Wisconsin
- Website: https://newamericanpress.com/

New American Press is an American not-for-profit literary press founded in 2001. It publishes poetry, fiction, and non-fiction. The company is located in Milwaukee, Wisconsin, and achieved non-profit status in 2012.

== History ==
New American Press was founded in 2001 as part of American Distractions, an arts-support initiative in North Carolina that supported gallery shows, fringe theater events, short film viewings, and literary events. When the company disbanded in 2002, David Bowen and Okla Elliott reformed the literary arm of the company as New American Press. New American Press originally published chapbooks, and released its first full-length in 2007, a collection of lesser-known Chekhov stories, each introduced by a contemporary writer. The press achieved non-profit status in 2012.

Notable authors published by New American Press include Kyle Minor, Lee K. Abbott, Alden Jones, Icelandic author Olafur Gunnarsson, and Thomas E Kennedy. The press also publishes New Stories from the Midwest and New Poetry from the Midwest.

== Awards and Publication ==
Each year, the organization annually awards the New American Fiction Prize and the New American Poetry Prize.

== New American Press authors ==
- Peter Filkins
- David Lloyd
- Anton Chekhov
- Stephen Haven
- Lee K. Abbott
- Duff Brenna
- Kyle Minor
- Micah Dean Hicks
- Miriam N. Kotzin
- Alden Jones
- David Armstrong
- Renée Ashley
- Margaret Rabb
- Shawn Fawson
- Brittney Scott
