= Burkhard Bilger =

American journalist

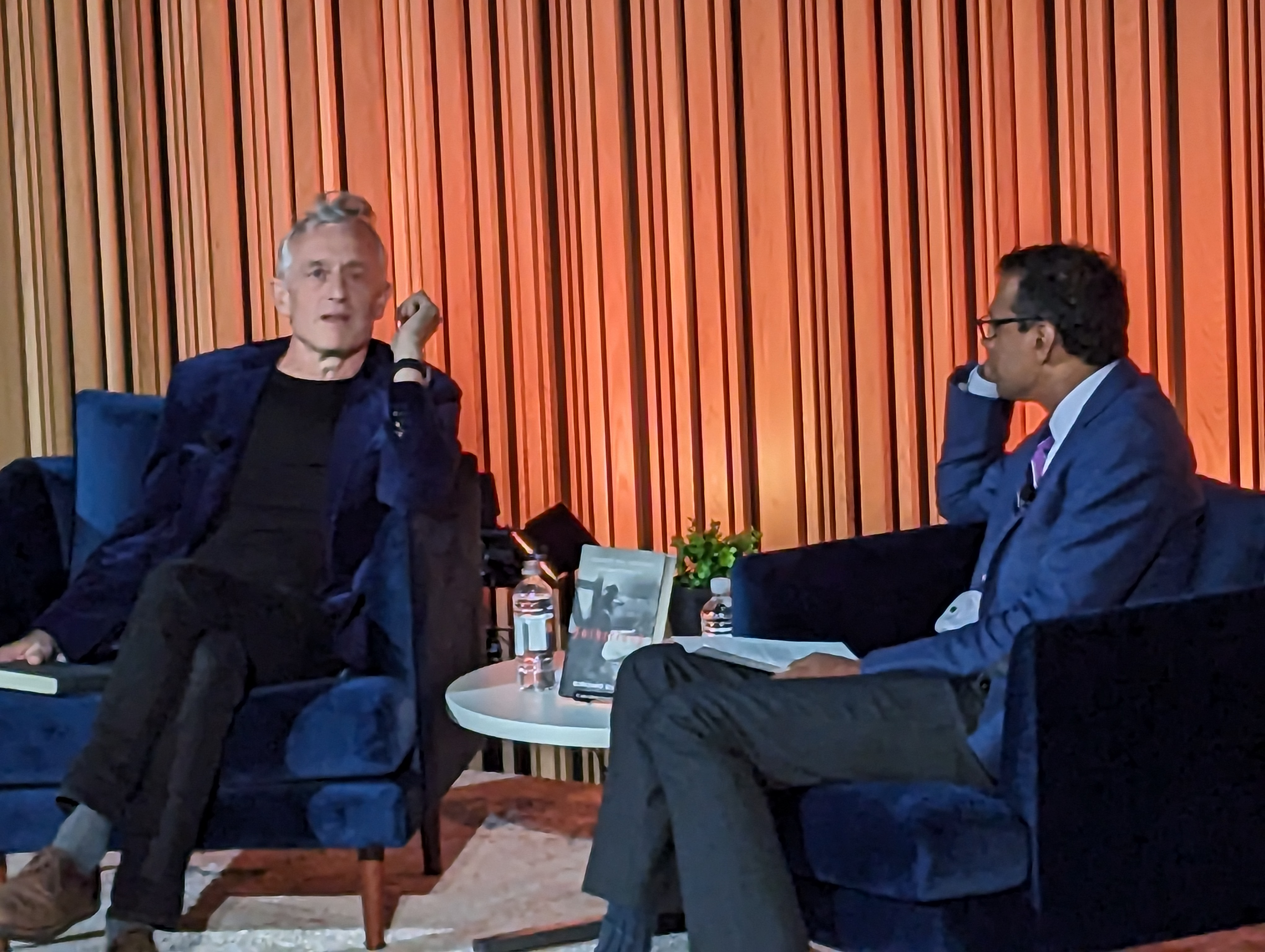
- Burkhard Bilger (left) with Atul Gawande (right) at Martin Luther King Jr. Memorial Library
- Born: 1964 (age 61–62); Stillwater, Oklahoma, U.S.
- Education: Yale University
- Occupations: Journalist, author
- Notable work: Fatherland, Noodling for Flatheads

Burkhard Bilger (born 1964) is an American journalist and author best known for his work as a staff writer for The New Yorker. He was born in January 1964 in Stillwater, Oklahoma. Bilger has received recognition for his books Fatherland (2023) and Noodling for Flatheads (2000).

== Early life ==
Burkhard Bilger was born in Stillwater, Oklahoma, in January 1964. He was born to Hans and Edeltraut Bilger (née Gönner). His father was a professor at Oklahoma State University, earning his PhD in Physics in 1961 from the University of Basel. His mother was a teacher and later earned her PhD in History from Oklahoma State University and taught at Phillips University and St. Gregory's University. His parents emigrated to the United States from Germany in 1962. Bilger graduated from Stillwater High School. He graduated from Yale University in 1986, where he pursued a dual degree in English and French.

== Career ==
After graduating from Yale, Bilger worked as a writer and deputy editor at The Sciences from 1994 to 1999, where his work contributed to two National Magazine Award wins and six nominations. He subsequently served as a senior editor at Discover from 1999 to 2005, a role he held concurrently with his early years at The New Yorker.

Burkhard Bilger joined The New Yorker in 2001 as a staff writer, where he has contributed to the publication's editorial content. His written works have been featured in various publications including The Atlantic, Harper's Magazine, and The New York Times. Bilger's writings have been anthologized ten times in The Best American Series. Bilger was the series editor for The Best American Science and Nature Writing for 2000 and 2001.

In recognition of his contributions to literature and journalism, Bilger has been awarded fellowships from Yale University, MacDowell, and the Cullman Center at the New York Public Library.

In addition to his career as a journalist, Bilger is an author. His debut book, Noodling for Flatheads, was a finalist for the PEN/Martha Albrand Award. His book Fatherland, about his grandfather's experience in wartime Alsace, was published in 2023.

== Personal life ==
He lives in Brooklyn with his wife Jennifer Nelson with whom he has three children. He and his wife perform in a band called Nine Pound Hammer, alongside actor Michael Shapiro.

== Bibliography ==
- Bilger, Burkhard. Noodling for Flatheads. Simon & Schuster, 2000.
- Bilger, Burkhard. Fatherland. Random House, 2023.
