= Patrick O'Keeffe =

Patrick O'Keeffe may refer to:

- Patrick O'Keeffe (politician) (1881–1973), Irish Sinn Féin politician
- Patrick O'Keeffe (writer) (born 1964), Irish-born American short story writer
