= Andrea Barrett =

American novelist and short story writer

- Born: November 16, 1954 (age 72); Boston, Massachusetts, U.S.
- Education: Union College (BA)
- Occupation: Novelist
- Writing career
- Genre: Historical fiction
- Notable awards: National Book Award for Fiction (1996)

Andrea Barrett (born November 16, 1954) is an American novelist and short story writer. Her collection Ship Fever won the 1996 U.S. National Book Award for Fiction, and she received a MacArthur Fellowship in 2001. Her book Servants of the Map was a finalist for the 2003 Pulitzer Prize for Fiction, and Archangel and Natural History were finalists for The Story Prize.

== Early life and education ==
Barrett was born in Boston, Massachusetts. She earned a B.A. in biology from Union College and briefly attended a Ph.D. program in zoology.

== Career ==
Barrett began writing fiction seriously in her thirties, but was relatively unknown until the publication of Ship Fever, a collection of novellas and short stories that won the National Book Award in 1996.

Barrett's work has been published in A Public Space, The Paris Review, Tin House, Ploughshares, One Story, TriQuarterly, Salmagundi, The American Scholar, and The Kenyon Review, among other places. Her fiction and essays have been selected for The Best American Short Stories, The Best American Science Writing, Best American Essays, the PEN/O. Henry Prize Stories, and other anthologies.

Barrett is particularly well known as a writer of historical fiction. Her work reflects her lifelong interest in science, and women in science. Many of her characters are scientists, often 19th-century biologists.

Some of her characters have appeared in more than one story or novel. In an appendix to her novel The Air We Breathe (2007), Barrett supplied a family tree, making clear the characters' relationships that began in Ship Fever.

Barrett was a fellow at the Center for Scholars and Writers at the New York Public Library. She lives in the eastern Adirondacks, near Lake Champlain.

Her short story collection Natural History was longlisted for the inaugural Carol Shields Prize for Fiction in 2023.

== Works ==
=== Novels ===
- (1988) Lucid Stars
- (1989) Secret Harmonies
- (1991) The Middle Kingdom
- (1993) The Forms of Water
- (1998) The Voyage of the Narwhal
- (2007) The Air We Breathe

=== Short story collections ===
- (1996) Ship Fever — winner of the National Book Award
- (2002) Servants of the Map — finalist for the Pulitzer Prize
- (2013) Archangel
- (2022) Natural History: Stories
