= John Haskell =

John Haskell may refer to:

- John G. Haskell (1832–1907), American architect
- John Haskell (author) (born 1958), American author
