= The Best American Science and Nature Writing =

Yearly anthology of science articles

First book in the series

The Best American Science and Nature Writing is a yearly anthology of popular science magazine articles published in the United States. It was started in 2000 and is part of The Best American Series published by Houghton Mifflin. Articles are chosen using the same procedure with other titles in the Best American series; the series editor chooses about 100 article candidates, from which the guest editor picks 25 or so for publication; the remaining runner-up articles listed in the appendix. The series is available through Mariner Books, which since 2019 is an imprint of HarperCollins.

Burkhard Bilger was the series editor for 2000 and 2001. Tim Folger was the series editor from 2002 to 2018. Jaime Green has been the series editor since 2019.

== Guest editors ==
- 2000: David Quammen
- 2001: Edward O. Wilson
- 2002: Natalie Angier
- 2003: Richard Dawkins
- 2004: Steven Pinker
- 2005: Jonathan Weiner
- 2006: Brian Greene
- 2007: Richard Preston
- 2008: Jerome Groopman
- 2009: Elizabeth Kolbert
- 2010: Freeman Dyson
- 2011: Mary Roach
- 2012: Dan Ariely
- 2013: Siddhartha Mukherjee
- 2014: Deborah Blum
- 2015: Rebecca Skloot
- 2016: Amy Stewart
- 2017: Hope Jahren
- 2018: Sam Kean
- 2019: Sy Montgomery
- 2020: Michio Kaku
- 2021: Ed Yong
- 2022: Ayana Elizabeth Johnson
- 2023: Carl Zimmer
- 2024: Bill McKibben
- 2025: Susan Orlean
- 2026: Randall Munroe

== See also ==
- The Best American Science Writing
