= The Assembly on Literature for Adolescents =

Teachers organization in the United States

ALAN, The Assembly on Literature for Adolescents is a teachers organization in the United States, an independent assembly of the National Council of Teachers of English (NCTE). Founded in November 1973, ALAN is made up of teachers, authors, librarians, publishers, teacher-educators and their students, and others who are particularly interested in the area of young adult literature. ALAN, which is self-governing, holds its annual meetings during the NCTE annual convention in November and also publishes The ALAN Review.

Almost from its inception, ALAN has given the ALAN award to honor those who have made outstanding contributions to the field of adolescent literature. The recipient may be a publisher, author, librarian, scholar, editor, or servant to the organization. Each year, an honoree is chosen by the Executive Board and receives the ALAN Award at the annual ALAN breakfast, which is held early morning Saturday during the NCTE Convention. In addition, in 2000 ALAN created the Hipple Award in honor of longtime Executive Secretary Ted Hipple, whose service led to the creation of the award for dedicated service to the organization.

== The ALAN Award ==
Almost from its inception, ALAN has given the ALAN Award to honor those who have made outstanding contributions to the field of adolescent literature. The recipient may be a publisher, author, librarian, scholar, editor, or servant to the organization. Each year, an honoree is chosen by the Executive Board and receives the ALAN Award at the annual ALAN breakfast, which is held early morning Saturday during the NCTE Convention. A list of past honorees is listed below.

ALAN Award recipients

- 2015 Lois Lowry, author
- 2014 David Levithan, author
- 2013 Judy Blume, author
- 2012 George Nicholson, publisher/agent
- 2011 Sharon Draper, author
- 2010 Jack Gantos, author
- 2009 Naomi Shihab Nye, author
- 2008 Laurie Halse Anderson, author
- 2007 Teri Lesesne, professor
- 2006 Virginia Monseau, professor, and Marc Aronson, author/editor
- 2005 Jerry Spinelli, author
- 2004 Jacqueline Woodson, author
- 2003 Norma Fox Mazer, author and Harry Mazer, author (co-winners)
- 2002 Paul Zindel, author
- 2001 Patty Campbell, author/critic
- 2000 M. E. Kerr, author
- 1999 Robert Lipsyte, author
- 1998 S. E. Hinton, author
- 1997 Mildred Taylor, author
- 1996 Bill Morris, publisher
- 1995 Robert C. Small, Jr., professor
- 1994 Walter Dean Myers, author
- 1993 Chris Crutcher, author
- 1992 Don Gallo, professor
- 1991 Gary Paulsen, author
- 1990 Richard Peck, author
- 1989 Cynthia Voigt, author
- 1988 Ted Hipple, professor
- 1987 Katherine Paterson, author, and Alleen Pace Nilsen
- 1986 Madeleine L'Engle, author
- 1985 Sue Ellen Bridgers, author
- 1984 Louise Rosenblatt, critic
- 1983 Ken Donelson, professor
- 1982 Robert Cormier, author
- 1981 Sheila Schwartz
- 1980 Dwight Burton
- 1979 Gerri LaRocque
- 1978 Mary Sucher
- 1977 Marguerite Archer
- 1976 Margaret K. McElderry, publisher, and M. Jerry Weiss, professor
- 1975 Margaret Edwards, librarian
- 1974 Stephen Judy and G. Robert Carlsen

== The Ted Hipple Service Award ==
The Ted Hipple Service Award is given each year to the individual who has contributed to the ALAN organization. It is named in honor of Ted Hipple, the first and long-time ALAN Executive Secretary, who died on November 25, 2004. Ted shaped ALAN through decades of unwavering service and support. He was a Professor of Education at the University of Tennessee, where he was a chair of the Department of Curriculum and Instruction. Previously, he was a Professor of Education at the University of Florida. He received his doctorate from the University of Illinois and was a high school English teacher at Homewood-Flossmoor High School.

Hipple Award recipients

- 2014 Connie Zitlow
- 2013 Rick Williams
- 2012 Joan F. Kaywell, University of South Florida, ALAN Past President and Membership Secretary
- 2011 Gary Salvner, Youngstown State University, ALAN Past President and Executive Secretary
- 2010 Christopher E. Crowe, Brigham Young University, ALAN Past President
- 2009 Wendy Lamb, Wendy Lamb Books, Random House
- 2008 Jeanne McDermott, Farrar, Straus & Giroux
- 2007 Patricia Kelly, ALAN Past President
- 2006 Alleen Pace Nilsen, ALAN Past President
- 2005 Bill Subick, National Council of Teachers of English
- 2004 John Mason, Scholastic, Inc.
- 2003 M. Jerry Weiss, ALAN Past President
- 2002 Terry Borzumato, Random House Children's Books
- 2001 Don Gallo, ALAN Past President
- 2000 Ted Hipple, ALAN Executive Secretary and Past President

== The Amelia Elizabeth Walden Award ==
Beginning 2009 the Amelia Elizabeth Walden Award annually recognizes "a book that exemplifies literary excellence, widespread appeal, and a positive approach to life in young adult literature". The winner and honor books must be fiction published in the United States during one year prior to the call for nominations (perhaps previously published elsewhere).

== ALAN Presidents ==
- 2015 Jennifer Buehler
- 2014 Daria Plumb
- 2013 Walter Mayes
- 2012 Jeffrey S. Kaplan
- 2011 C. J. Bott
- 2010 Wendy Glenn
- 2009 James Blasingame
- 2008 Pamela Sissi Carroll
- 2007 David Macinnis Gill
- 2006 Kathryn Kelly
- 2005 Diane Tuccillo
- 2004 Patty Campbell
- 2003 Michael Cart
- 2002 Bill Mollineaux
- 2001 Christopher E. Crowe
- 2000 Teri Lesesne
- 1999 Connie Zitlow
- 1998 Joan Kaywell
- 1997 Lois Stover
- 1996 Gary Salvner
- 1995 Charlie Reed
- 1994 Diana Mitchell
- 1993 Virginia Monseau
- 1992 Betty Carter
- 1991 Kay Bushman
- 1990 Betty Poe
- 1989 Patricia Kelly
- 1988 Barbara Samuels
- 1987 C. Anne Webb
- 1986 Donald R. Gallo
- 1985 Hazel Davis
- 1984 Richard Abrahamson
- 1983 Mike Angelotti
- 1982 Robert C. Small, Jr.
- 1981 Al Muller
- 1980 Hugh Agee
- 1979 Kenneth Donelson
- 1978 Alleen Pace Nilsen
- 1977 Sheila Schwartz
- 1976 Ted Hipple
- 1975 Helen Painter
- 1974 M. Jerry Weiss
- 1973 Marguerite Archer
