= Quan Barry =

American poet and novelist

- Born: Saigon
- Occupation: Writer
- Writing career
- Period: 2000–present
- Genres: Poetry, literary fiction, plays

Amy Quan Barry is a Vietnamese-American poet, novelist, and playwright. She is a recipient of the Agnes Lynch Starrett Poetry Prize. Barry is a Lorraine Hansberry Professor of English at the University of Wisconsin–Madison.

== Biography ==
She was born in Saigon raised in Danvers, Massachusetts, where she played on the Danvers High School field hockey team in the late 1980s.

She graduated from the University of Virginia with a BA in liberal arts and the University of Michigan with an MFA, and was a Wallace Stegner Fellow at Stanford University and a Diane Middlebrook Poetry Fellow at the University of Wisconsin. She teaches at the University of Wisconsin–Madison.

Her work has appeared in The Kenyon Review, The Missouri Review, The New Yorker, The Southeast Review, and the Virginia Quarterly Review.

In 2000, Barry's poetry book Asylum won the Agnes Lynch Starrett Poetry Prize and was a finalist for the 2002 Society of Midland Authors' Poetry Award. Barry spoke at an event hosted and sponsored by Central Washington University and the National Endowment for the Artsm in 2017. In 2021, Barry was the final judge for the 2021 New American Poetry Prize.

Barry's writing touches on a variety of genres, including magical realism and speculative fiction.

== Works ==
=== Novels ===
- She Weeps Each Time You're Born. Random House. 2015. ISBN 978-0-307-91177-3.
- We Ride Upon Sticks. Penguin Random House. 2020. ISBN 978-1-524-74809-8.
- When I'm Gone, Look for Me in the East. Penguin Random House. 2022. ISBN 978-1-524-74811-1.
- The Unveiling. Grove Press. 2025. ISBN 978-0-8021-6535-0.

=== Poetry collections ===
- Asylum. University of Pittsburgh Press. 2001. ISBN 978-0-8229-5769-0.
- Controvertibles. University of Pittsburgh Press. 2004. ISBN 978-0-8229-5860-4.
- Water Puppets. University of Pittsburgh Press. 2011. ISBN 9780822961604.
- Loose Strife. University of Pittsburgh Press. 2015. ISBN 9780822963295.

=== Anthology contributions ===
- "Asylum" in Boller, Diane; Selby, Don; Yost, Chryss, eds. (2003). Poetry daily: 366 poems from the world's most popular poetry website. Sourcebooks. p. 482. ISBN 978-1-4022-0151-6.
- "the exiled", "intermurals", "tradition", "crossing the South China Sea as analgesia", "Emmett Till’s Open Casket as La Pietá", and "Doug Flutie’s 1984 Orange Bowl Hail Mary as Water into Fire" in Ochester, Ed, ed. (2007). American poetry now: Pitt poetry series anthology. University of Pittsburgh Press. pp. 16–22. ISBN 978-0-8229-4310-5.
- Hix, H.L., ed. (2008). New Voices: Contemporary Poetry from the United States. Irish Pages. ISBN 978-0-9544257-9-1.

=== Poems and short fiction ===
- "If, Then". The New Yorker. May 2000.
- "errata from the field: demographics". AGNI. 2003.
- "mission statement, or the Saturday after Sinatra died". AGNI. 2003.
- "Gnosticism". Ploughshares. Spring 2006.
- "Structuralism". Ploughshares. Spring 2006.
- "The impulsive man acts with fierceness". The Kenyon Review. April 2009.

== Awards and honors ==
- 2010 University of Pittsburgh Donald Hall Prize in Poetry, Water Puppets
- 2012 PEN Open Book Award, finalist, Water Puppets

== See also ==
- List of poets from the United States
