= Ungrading =

Book by Susan D. Blum

- Author: Susan D. Blum
- Publisher: West Virginia University Press
- Publication date: 2020
- ISBN: 978-1-949-19983-3

Ungrading is a grading technique, most commonly used within writing studies classes, that gets rid of percent or letter grades for every assignment. Instead, the teacher provides verbal or written feedback on each piece of completed work allowing students to still know how they can improve without being graded. In most cases, teachers make students complete a self-reflection where students explain their process in what they have completed and learned throughout the entire class. Although the teacher has the final say on a student’s grade based on what is within the self-reflection, the student also exemplifies why they deserve a certain grade as a part of this reflection. Ungrading is considered an alternative approach to grading, like contract grading, but the two approaches differ in the systems they use. Ungrading is a set of practices described by author Jesse Stommel as "raising an eyebrow at grades as a systemic practice, distinct from simply 'not grading'".

== Overview ==
Ungrading is primarily used in Composition Studies because most of the assignments are open-ended or subjective. The term ungrading doesn't mean getting rid of all assessment, rather it means changing how teachers and students go about communicating and assessing to focus on growth. Ungrading stems from the idea that current assessment practices in education, which have been in place since the 1940's, undermine learning and collaboration.

== Implementation and student response ==
Started in 2001, Jesse Stommel removed the use of grade on students' work. During years of instruction, he developed his own ungrading technique. In his classes, students write 2-3 self-reflections, where the first reflection is usually guided with specific questions, and the last reflection is in essay format. At the end of the term, students determine their own grades, while Stommel reserved the right to change students' grades.

In 2023, Austin Bailey and Caroline Wilkinson implemented the approach of ungrading in two composition courses at New Jersey City University, and conducted research about the effect of ungrading. They practiced ungrading through “Narrative Self-Evaluations”, which asks students to reflect on their own writing process, including their goals, struggles or other experiences. Instead of simply providing a letter grade, these reflective writing assignments encourage students to focus on their own performance in class, such as thinking and learning habits. Bailey and Wilkinson then gave specific suggestions to each student based on their reflection. In their students' feedback, ungrading created a relaxing study environment for them, which reduced their feeling of anxiety and allowed them to express themselves comfortably when they were writing.

In 2023, Hannah T. Davis was inspired by the idea of ungrading raised by Susan. D Blum in her collection: Ungrading: Why Rating Students Undermines Learning (and What to Do Instead). She decided to practice ungrading and examine this grading strategy in first-year writing courses. Davis used three grading approaches in the same writing course, including traditional grading, grading based on portfolio, and ungrading. All classes had the same assignments, but students were graded by different approaches. Students in the ungrading section were required to reflect on their own writing and write an evaluation about their progress. Davis found that students tended to prove that they deserve a good grade, instead of reflecting on their writing weaknesses objectively. Additionally, half of the students in ungrading class showed a preference to be graded by traditional grades as it provides them extrinsic motivation.

In 2025, S. L. Stansberry and P. Thompson used ungrading instead of the traditional grading system in two graduate-level educational technology courses. To set up the ungrading environment, students were asked to answer several questions about how they will self-evaluate their progress during the instruction. Students needed to discuss the challenges they encountered, the development they made, and the goals they planned to achieve. Instructors tried to shift students' focus from getting a decent grade to personal development by giving them these questions. Moreover, they allowed students to decide their own grades, while they only reserved the right to raise their grades rather than lower them. Initially, some students expressed that ungrading made them feel confused and uncertain. However, through the final surveys, most students indicated that ungrading had a positive effect, as ungrading encouraged them to focus more on personal growth and creativity, therefore providing them stronger motivation towards learning.

== Advantages ==
Ungrading gets rid of grades until the very end of course. This allows students to put more focus on learning and not as impacted by the negative effects of grades since "Grades can dampen existing intrinsic motivation, give rise to extrinsic motivation, enhance fear of failure, reduce interest, decrease enjoyment in class work, increase anxiety, hamper performance on follow-up tasks, stimulate avoidance of challenging tasks, and heighten competitiveness." Ungrading is also shown to give less stress to students throughout the course of a class because ungrading also allows students to take risks and try new techniques, especially with classes in writing studies, without having to worry about a grade drop.

== Disadvantages ==
Since ungrading doesn't provide students with grades on every assignment, this leads to uncertainty within students because they don't get a grade until the very end of the class. "While traditional grades may often produce more stress than ungrading, ungrading can also produce novel forms of stress." This alternative grading system can create more work for teachers through possibly creating arguments or discussions with school administration questioning this new system. Another way ungrading can create more work for teachers is by the feedback teachers give back to students instead of grades. Teachers having to make personalized statements for each student can take a lot of time depending on the importance of the assignment or project.
