= Alleen Pace Nilsen =

American literary scholar, linguist

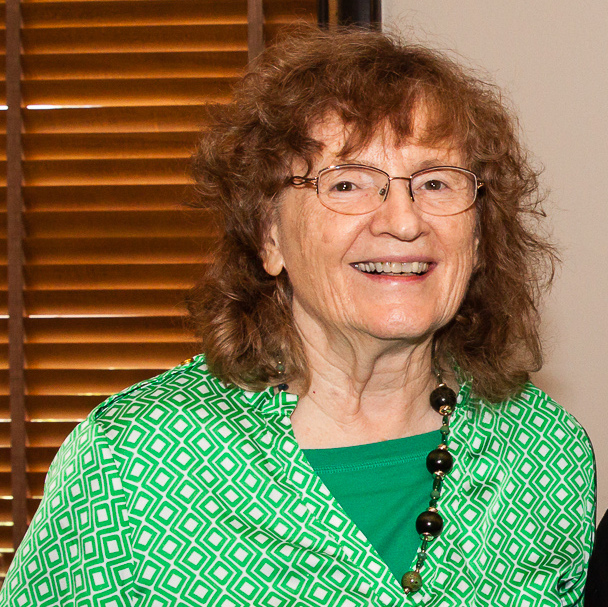
- Alleen Pace Nilsen (2015)
- Born: October 10, 1936; Phoenix, Arizona
- Known for: Founding the International Society for Humor Studies
- Title: Professor Emeritus
- Spouse: Don Nilsen
- Awards: The Assembly on Literature for Adolescents (ALAN) award (1987)

Academic background
- Education: University of Iowa
- Thesis: (1973)

Academic work
- Discipline: Linguist, literary scholar
- Institutions: Arizona State University
- Main interests: Humor studies, children's literature, young adult literature, onomastics, linguistics
- Notable works: Sexism and Language (1977); Literature for today's young adults (1980); Encyclopedia of 20th-Century American Humor (2000)
- Website: https://isearch.asu.edu/profile/6812

Alleen Pace Nilsen is an American literary scholar, linguist, and one of the pioneers of both humor studies and children's literature studies. She is Professor Emeritus in the Department of English at Arizona State University, where she was previously the director of the English Education Program. Together with her husband Don Nilsen, she co-founded the International Society for Humor Studies.

== Academic career ==
Alleen Pace Nilsen was originally trained as an English teacher, receiving a degree from Brigham Young University, and worked as a First Class teacher at Malcolm Price Laboratory School, University of Northern Iowa. In 1973, she received her PhD in English Education from the University of Iowa. Her dissertation dealt with occurrences of sexist language in school materials.

In 1980, Nilsen and Kenneth L. Donelson co-authored Literature for Today's Young Adults, which became a seminal textbook for teachers and librarians and has seen nine editions so far. In the 1980s, Nilsen was also co-editor of the English Journal for the National Council of Teachers of English (NCTE), a president of The Assembly on Literature for Adolescents of NCTE (ALAN), and a founding editor of ALAN Review. In 1987, she received the ALAN award, a yearly award whose aim is to "honor those who have made outstanding contributions to the field of adolescent literature."

== International Society for Humor Studies ==
Together, with her husband Don Lee Fred Nilsen, Nilsen founded the International Society for Humor Studies (humorstudies.org).

Humor: International Journal of Humor Research is a peer-reviewed academic journal published by Walter de Gruyter on behalf of the International Society for Humor Studies.

Nilsen served as President of the International Society for Humor Studies in 2000. She also, alongside Don Lee Fred Nilsen, was co-president of the American Name Society in 2008.

Together, with her husband Don Lee Fred Nilsen, Nilsen founded the Don and Alleen Nilsen Young Scholars Award (DANYS), to inspire young scholars to prepare high quality presentations for the annual International Society for Humor Studies Conferences.

== Other work ==
Between 1967 and 1969, Alleen lived in Afghanistan, where she accompanied her husband Don on an international development mission. Based on these experiences, the couple created a website called "Afghanistan for Kids", which aims to educate American children and their parents about the country.

Don and Alleen Nilsen have also created several dozens of introductory PowerPoint presentations with the aim of educating the general public about humor research, gender, and other topics their academic work has touched upon.

== Select bibliography ==
- Sexism and Language (co-editor) (1977) National Council of Teachers
- Language Play: An Introduction to Linguistics (w/ Don Nilsen) (1978) Newbury House Publishers
- Literature for today's young adults (w/ K.L. Donelson) (1980) Scott Foresman
- Encyclopedia of 20th-century American Humor (w/ Don Nilsen) (2000) Oryx Press
- The Language of Humor: An Introduction (w/ Don Nilsen) (2018) Cambridge University Press
