= In Other Rooms, Other Wonders =

2009 short story collection by Daniyal Mueenuddin

- First edition
- Author: Daniyal Mueenuddin
- Genre: Short story
- Publisher: Norton
- Publication date: 2009
- Publication place: Pakistan, United States
- ISBN: 978-0-393-33720-4

In Other Rooms, Other Wonders is a collection of short stories by Pakistani-American author Daniyal Mueenuddin. It won The Story Prize and the Commonwealth Writers' Prize, and was a finalist for the 2010 Pulitzer Prize and the 2009 National Book Award.

== Stories ==
- "Nawabdin Electrician"
- "Saleema"
- "Provide, Provide"
- "About a Burning Girl"
- "In Other Rooms, Other Wonders"
- "Our Lady of Paris"
- "Lily"
- "A Spoiled Man"

== Summary ==
The stories uncovers a variegated society in which people's social status and expectations are understood without being explained, and in which the class system and poverty are shown to influence any decision made at a critical moment in the characters' lives. The book consists of eight linked stories written in Pakistan in the 1970s, '80s and '90s, and describe Pakistani culture from within.

== Reviews ==
Sonny Mehta, editor-in-chief and chairman of Bertelsmann AG's Knopf Doubleday Publishing Group, says;

"The Pakistani writers are addressing change and what's happening today in the world. There is something completely contemporary in this writing."

Poet and Writer Magazine writes;

"Mueenuddin's book investigates life in his native Pakistan (he was also raised in Massachusetts) through the lenses of individuals in different stations, from an electrician to a woman servant to a farm manager, a position the author himself occupies today. He described himself as being in the profession of identifying characters, both in his writing and in his business at home."

== See also ==
- This Is Where the Serpent Lives
