= Don Nielsen =

Don Nielsen may refer to:

- Donald Nielsen Jr. (born 1951), American biathlete
- Don Nakaya Nielsen (1959–2017), American kickboxer, professional wrestler, actor, and chiropractor

== See also ==
- Don Nilsen (born 1934), American linguist and humor scholar
- Don Neilson, Canadian country music artist
