= West Virginia University Press =

American university press and publisher

- Parent company: West Virginia University
- Country of origin: United States
- Headquarters location: Morgantown, West Virginia
- Distribution: Chicago Distribution Center
- Publication types: Books, academic journals, digital media
- Official website: www.wvupressonline.com

West Virginia University Press (WVU Press) is a university press and publisher in the state of West Virginia. A part of West Virginia University, the press publishes books and journals with a particular emphasis on Appalachian studies, history, higher education, the social sciences, and interdisciplinary books about energy, environment, and resources. The press also has a small but highly regarded program in fiction and creative nonfiction, including Deesha Philyaw's The Secret Lives of Church Ladies, winner of the 2021 PEN/Faulkner Award for Fiction, winner of the Story Prize 2020/21, winner of the Los Angeles Times Art Seidenbaum Award for First Fiction, and a finalist for the National Book Award for Fiction in 2020. John Warner wrote in the Chicago Tribune, "If you are wondering what the odds are of a university press book winning three major awards, being a finalist for a fourth, and going to a series on a premium network, please know that this is the only example." In 2021, another of WVU Press's works of fiction, Jim Lewis's Ghosts of New York, was named a New York Times Notable Book of the Year. WVU Press also collaborates on digital publications, notably West Virginia History: An Open Access Reader.

In The Chronicle of Higher Education, Rachel Toor described the press as "a new publishing heavyweight." The press has also been described as "a small but intellectually ambitious press that prides itself on placing regional issues in dialogue with global concerns." Writing in the New York Times, Margaret Renkl cited two titles from West Virginia University Press as evidence that "University Presses Are Keeping American Literature Alive."

West Virginia University Press is part of the Association of University Presses.

West Virginia University Press maintains Booktimist, a blog about books and culture, at https://booktimist.com/.

== History ==
West Virginia University Press was founded in the mid-1960s by Dean of Libraries Dr. Robert Munn. It focused on publishing bibliographies and histories of the coal industry.

In 1999, the press was relocated to within the Eberly College of Arts and Sciences under the direction of Dr. Patrick Conner. In 2008, Carrie Mullen took over leadership of the press as director.

In 2014, Derek Krissoff, previously editor in chief at the University of Nebraska Press, began his tenure as director. In a forum on the future of the university press in the Chronicle of Higher Education, Krissoff said "The book is necessary and important—and, while it's hardly a static artifact, it's proved remarkably durable. Books are also expensive, especially in terms of the skilled labor necessary to acquire and market them. But they're worth it." Krissoff resigned in May, 2023. Sarah Munroe became interim director, and resigned in September, 2023.

== Publishing categories ==
The press publishes books in fiction and nonfiction, as well as in the following scholarly areas:

- African American literature
- Appalachian studies
- art
- digital writing & literature
- energy and environment
- geography
- history
- medieval studies
- music
- natural history
- sociology
- sports
- West Virginia

== Notable books ==
- Anthony Harkins and Meredith McCarroll's edited collection Appalachian Reckoning: A Region Responds to Hillbilly Elegy
- Muriel Rukeyser's long poem The Book of the Dead in a new edition
- Greg Bottoms's Lowest White Boy
- Tom Hansell's After Coal
- Joshua R. Eyler's How Humans Learn: The Science and Stories behind Effective College Teaching
- Andrew and Alex Lichtenstein's Marked, Unmarked, Remembered
- Lee Maynard's Crum trilogy
- Davitt McAteer's Monongah: The Tragic Story of the Worst Industrial Accident in US History
- Eyes Glowing at the Edge of the Woods (an anthology)
- Katharine Antolini's Memorializing Motherhood
- Deesha Philyaw's The Secret Lives of Church Ladies
- Neema Avashia's Another Appalachia: Coming Up Queer and Indian in a Mountain State

== Series ==
The press publishes series in the following areas:

- Central Appalachian Natural History
- Energy and Society
- Histories of Capitalism and the Environment
- In Place
- Radical Natures
- Regenerations
- Rural Studies
- Sounding Appalachia
- Teaching and Learning in Higher Education
- West Virginia and Appalachia
- West Virginia Classics

=== Open Access Reader ===
In January 2016, WVU Press and WVU Libraries launched West Virginia History: An Open Access Reader as a free, online collection of previously published essays drawn from the journal West Virginia History and other WVU Press publications.

== Journals ==
West Virginia Press publishes the following peer-reviewed journals in the humanities and education.

- Essays in Medieval Studies
- Tolkien Studies: An Annual Scholarly Review
- Victorian Poetry
- West Virginia History: A Journal of Regional Studies

== See also ==
- List of English-language book publishing companies
- List of university presses
