= The Best American Science Writing =

Annual popular science anthology

The Best American Science Writing was a yearly anthology of popular science articles published in the United States, which commenced publication in 2000. The book series was published by Ecco Press (HarperCollins) and concluded after the 2012 installment of the series. Jesse Cohen was the series editor. The series is unrelated to The Best American Science and Nature Writing, which is a part of the Best American Series published by Houghton Mifflin Harcourt.

== Guest editors ==
- 2000: James Gleick
- 2001: Timothy Ferris
- 2002: Matt Ridley
- 2003: Oliver Sacks
- 2004: Dava Sobel
- 2005: Alan Lightman
- 2006: Atul Gawande
- 2007: Gina Kolata
- 2008: Sylvia Nasar
- 2009: Natalie Angier
- 2010: Jerome Groopman
- 2011: Rebecca Skloot and Floyd Skloot
- 2012: Michio Kaku

In 2010, HarperCollins also published The Best of the Best American Science Writing. The book combined selections from ten former series editors who each selected their favorite essays for republication in the collection.

== See also ==
- The Best American Science and Nature Writing
- The Best Australian Science Writing
