= New American Fiction Prize =

The New American Fiction Prize is an annual prize awarded by New American Press. The award was established in 2010 to give voice to emerging writers of innovative fiction.

The New American Fiction Prize is awarded annually to one winner for a book-length work of fiction. Manuscripts may be novels, novellas, collections of stories and/or novellas, novels in verse, linked collections, or full-length collections of flash fiction. Authors of winning manuscripts receive a cash award of US$1500 and a box of contributor copies, and their collections are subsequently published under a standard contract.

== Winners ==
- 2010 Craig Davis for Ramshackle Wonderlands
- 2011 Micah Dean Hicks for Electricity and Other Dreams
- 2013 Alden Jones for Unaccompanied Minors
- 2014 David Armstrong for Reiterations
- 2015 Wayne Harrison for Wrench
- 2016 Marina Mularz for Welcome to Freedom Point
- 2017 Seth Borgen for If I Die in Ohio
- 2018 David R. Slavitt for Dwindling
- 2019 Amy Neswald I Know You Love Me Too
- 2020 Rachel Swearingen for How to Walk on Water

== See also ==
- List of American literary awards
