= Stay Awake (book) =

2012 collection of short stories by Dan Chaon

First edition

Stay Awake is a collection of short stories by Dan Chaon, published in 2012 by Ballantine Books (ISBN 978-0345530370). It was a finalist for The Story Prize.
