= Deesha Philyaw =

American author, columnist, and speaker

- Philyaw at the 2026 Texas Book Festival
- Born: 1971 (age 54–55); Jacksonville, Florida
- Education: Yale University (BA); Manhattanville College (MA)
- Occupations: Author, workshop leader, columnist
- Website: deeshaphilyaw.com

Deesha Philyaw is an American author, columnist, and public speaker. Her debut short story collection, The Secret Lives of Church Ladies, was a finalist for the 2020 National Book Award for Fiction and won The Story Prize. Her personal essay writing topics include race, sex, gender, and pop culture.

== Early life and education ==
Philyaw was raised in Jacksonville, Florida. She received a BA in economics from Yale University and an MA in education from Manhattanville College.

== Career ==
=== Early career ===
Philyaw worked in corporate communications at a Pittsburgh-area bank before quitting to pursue her writing consultancy and freelance writing full-time. She decided to give up on her major and pursue her passion. She cites among her literary inspirations Toni Morrison, James Baldwin, Nafissa Thompson-Spires, Bassey Ikpi, and Tyrese Coleman.

=== Books ===
Philyaw's first book, Co-Parenting 101: Helping Your Kids Thrive in Two Households After Divorce, was written in collaboration with her ex-husband, Michael D. Thomas, and published in May 2013.

Her debut short story collection, The Secret Lives of Church Ladies (2020), received critical acclaim. Writing in the Minneapolis Star Tribune, Marion Winik said "Juicy goodness bursts from every page of Deesha Philyaw's debut short story collection. . . . This collection marks the emergence of a bona fide literary treasure." A starred review in Kirkus Reviews said, "A collection of luminous stories populated by deeply moving and multifaceted characters. . . . Tender, fierce, proudly black and beautiful, these stories will sneak inside you and take root." The book won the 2020 Los Angeles Times Book Prize, the 2021 PEN/Faulkner Award for Fiction, the 2020/2021 Story Prize and was a finalist for the National Book Award for Fiction.

Philyaw's debut novel, The True Confessions of First Lady Freeman, is set to be published by Mariner Books in September 2026.

=== Other writing ===
Philyaw has written a series of columns for The Rumpus, titled Visible: Women Writers of Color and for Literary Mama, The Girl is Mine. Her essays have also appeared in the Harvard Review, The New York Times, and The Washington Post.

=== Podcasting ===
In 2021, Philyaw appeared on Storybound (podcast) reading an excerpts from her book, The Secret Lives of Church Ladies, with music sampled from Gil Assayas of GLASYS.

=== Television ===
In 2021, it was announced that The Secret Lives of Church Ladies would be adapted for television by HBO Max with Philyaw and actress Tessa Thompson executive producing through Thompson's production company Viva Maude.

== Works ==
- Co-Parenting 101: Helping Your Kids Thrive in Two Households After Divorce (written with Michael D. Thomas). New Harbinger Publications. 2013. ISBN 9781608824632.
- The Secret Lives of Church Ladies. West Virginia University Press. 2020. ISBN 9781949199734.
- The True Confessions of First Lady Freeman. Mariner Books. September 29, 2026. ISBN 978-0063383074.

== Personal life ==
Philyaw currently lives in Miami, Florida with her two daughters.
