= Jaime Green (author) =

American science writer

- Born: December 12, 1982
- Education: Brown University (BA); Columbia University (MFA)

Jaime Green (born December 12, 1982) is an American science writer. She is known for her debut book The Possibility of Life and for her work since 2019 as series editor of The Best American Science and Nature Writing. She holds an MFA in Creative Nonfiction from Columbia University and is a lecturer at Smith College.

Green’s first book, The Possibility of Life, was published in 2023 by Hanover Square Press in the US and Duckworth Books in the UK. The book received positive reviews from outlets including The Washington Post, The Wall Street Journal, and The New Republic. At The Washington Post, Annalee Newitz wrote, "A wide-ranging and delightful survey, The Possibility of Life is the kind of book that makes you exclaim 'Wow!' out loud while reading." It was featured on The TODAY Show and in the Science Friday Book Club. The Possibility of Life has been cited in academic publications and was a finalist for the Los Angeles Times Book Prize in Science and Technology in 2023.

Green was the romance fiction columnist for the New York Times Book Review from 2018 to 2020, and associate editor of Future Tense at Slate from 2019 to 2023. From 2014-2016 she produced a literary podcast called The Catapult. Her writing has appeared in Slate, The New York Times Magazine, and Aeon.

Green was on Jeopardy! College Championship in 2001.
