= Daniyal Mueenuddin =

Pakistani-American author (born 1963)

- دانیال معین الدین
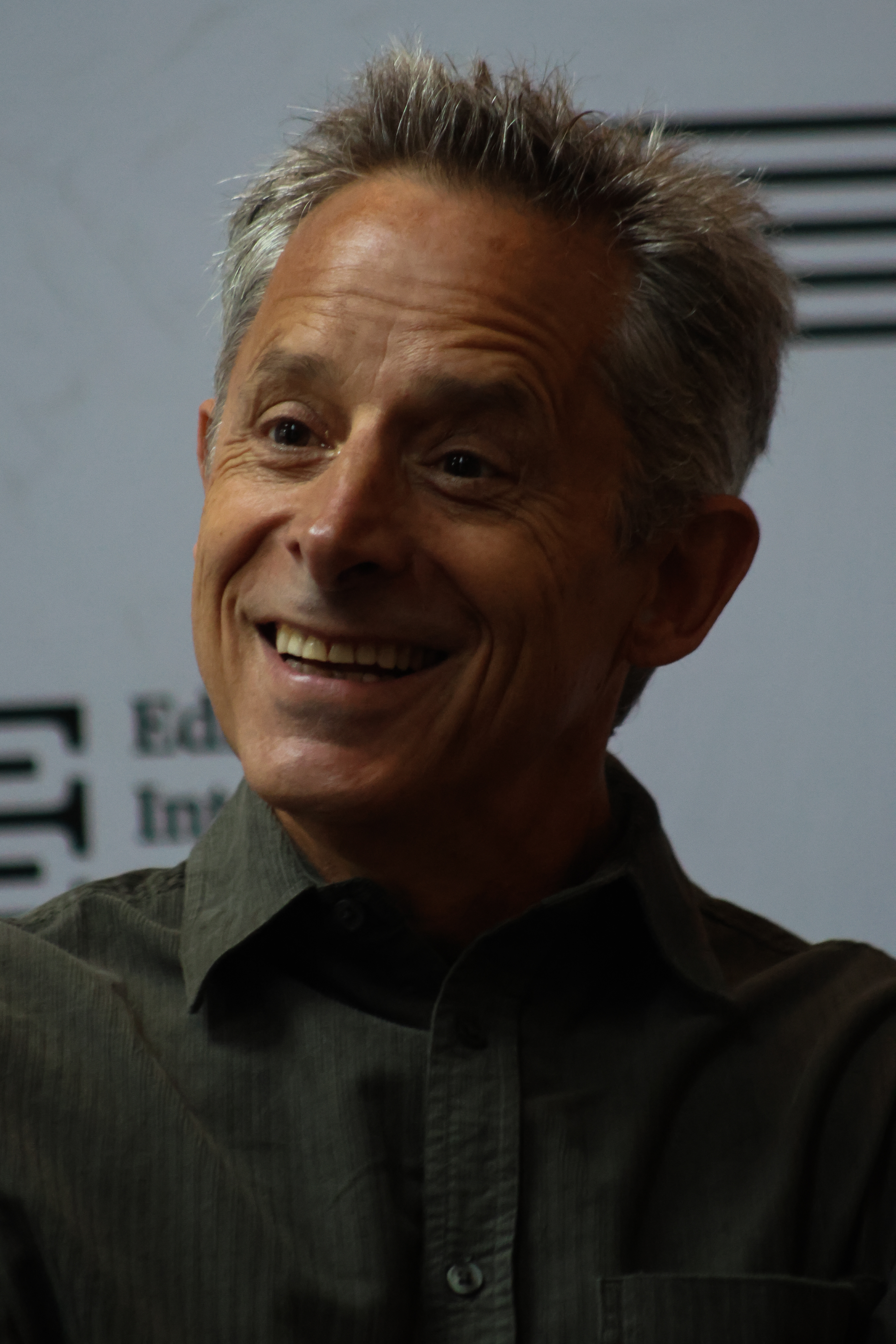
- Mueenuddin at the 2026 Edinburgh Book Festival
- Born: 1963 (age 62–63); Los Angeles, California, U.S.
- Education: Dartmouth College (BA); Yale University (JD); University of Arizona (MFA)
- Occupation: Author
- Known for: Critically short story

Daniyal Mueenuddin (Urdu: دانیال معین الدین; born 1963) is a Pakistani-American author who writes in English. His short story collection In Other Rooms, Other Wonders, has been translated into sixteen languages, and won The Story Prize, the Commonwealth Writers' Prize and other honors and critical acclaim.

Born in Los Angeles, USA, he spent his childhood in Pakistan. At the age of thirteen he moved back to the US, where he received higher education and worked as a lawyer, before devoting his efforts to writing. He now lives in both Oslo, Norway and his farm in Pakistan.

== Early life and education ==
Mueenuddin was born in Los Angeles, USA, to a Pakistani father Ghulam Mueenuddin and a second-generation Norwegian-American mother, Barbara. His father was a member of the Indian Civil Service (ICS), and after the independence of Pakistan in 1947 he became Secretary of Pakistan's Establishment Division, which administered the civil service (later he was the country's Chief Election Commissioner). In the late 1950s, Mueenuddin's father was posted for several years to Washington as chief negotiator of the Indus Waters Treaty (1960) between India and Pakistan where he met his future wife Barbara, a reporter at The Washington Post. After a courtship and marriage they moved to Pakistan in 1960, living first in Rawalpindi and later in Lahore. Keeping with an agreement she had made with her father, a surgeon in Los Angeles who had heard of unsanitary conditions in Pakistani hospitals, his expectant mother flew back to the U.S. and Mueenuddin was born in Los Angeles in April 1963. Two months later mother and child returned to Rawalpindi, then Pakistan's temporary capital. Several years later, the family moved to Lahore, where Mueenuddin attended the Lahore American School. Mueenuddin remembers his youth there as a "magical" time which included hunting and riding. Mueenuddin and his brother Tamur often visited the US in the summers.

At age 13 his parents separated and the two boys moved with their mother back to the US, where Mueenuddin spent five years at prep-school, Groton School in MA, graduating in 1981. Later he graduated magna cum laude from Dartmouth College. The summer of his graduation he returned to Pakistan where his father, in his 80s, was in failing health, and losing control of the prosperous family mango farm to its managers. His father asked him to stay in Pakistan and rescue the farm. Mueenuddin recalled it as a lonely and arduous life, but one well suited to Daniyal, who spent early mornings writing poetry, and evenings reading through the library that his mother had left behind. (Later in life Mueenuddin would thank his mother for teaching him "that becoming a writer was a legitimate thing to do." His mother was a Trustee of PEN American Center and died in October 2009.) In 1990 his father died, leaving Mueenuddin more exposed but also more independent. He ran the farm as a business, and not in the traditional feudal way like many of his neighbors, by "hiring good managers, paying them well, and demanding a lot of them." Mueenuddin would also later inherit his mother's family farm in Wisconsin.

== Career ==
In 1993, with the farm running fairly smoothly, he decided to spend time in the West again and moved back to the US where he attended Yale Law School for three years, serving as Editor-in-Chief of the Yale Journal of International Law and as Director of the Allard K. Lowenstein International Human Rights Clinic. After graduation he worked briefly at Human Rights Watch and then as a corporate lawyer at the New York firm Debevoise & Plimpton between 1998 and 2001. However he found the life unsatisfying and decided to begin a new career in writing, explaining that:

Sitting in my office on the forty-second floor of a black skyscraper in Manhattan, looking out over the East river, I gradually developed confidence in the stories I had lived through during those years on the farm. I realized that I was in a unique position to write these stories for a Western audience – stories about the farm and the old feudal ways, the dissolving feudal order and the new way coming, the sleek businessmen from the cities. I resigned from the law firm, returned to Pakistan, and began writing the stories that make up In Other Rooms, Other Wonders.

He enrolled in the MFA program (writing) at the University of Arizona at Tucson, where he earned a degree in 2004. His first published story was "Our Lady of Paris" published in Zoetrope: All-Story in Fall 2006. This gained the attention of a literary agent, Bill Clegg, who then helped him to publish a story in Granta and three stories in The New Yorker. Mueenuddin's first collection of stories In Other Rooms, Other Wonders was published in February 2009 (four new stories, plus the four previously published). His novel This Is Where the Serpent Lives was published in January 2026. Mueenuddin's writing is influenced by Anton Chekov; he has said "I like the Russians, like everyone else. I am constantly reading Chekov. I am never not reading Chekov."

== Awards ==
Mueenuddin was the winner of the 2010 Rosenthal Family Foundation Award from the American Academy of Arts and Letters. In Other Rooms, Other Wonders was the winner of The Story Prize for 2009, and the 2010 Commonwealth Writers' Prize (Best First Book, Europe and South Asia). The collection was also one of four finalists for the 2009 National Book Awards, one of three finalists for the 2010 Pulitzer Prize, and was a finalist for the 2010 Los Angeles Times First Fiction Award, and the 2010 Ondaatje Prize. In addition, it was selected among TIME magazine's top ten books of the year, Publishers Weekly's top ten books of 2009, The Economist's top ten fiction books of 2009, The Guardian's best books of the year, the New Statesman's best books of the year, and The New York Times 100 Notable Books of the Year.

One of his short stories, "Nawabdin Electrician", was selected by Salman Rushdie for the Best American Short Stories of 2008. Another story, "A Spoiled Man", was selected for the 2010 edition of The PEN/O. Henry Prize Stories. Mueenuddin's first published story, "Our Lady of Paris," which appeared in Zoetrope, was a finalist for the 2007 National Magazine Awards in fiction.

== Personal life ==
Mueenuddin is married to Cecilie Brenden Mueenuddin, a Norwegian anthropologist whom he met while on a Fulbright Scholarship in Oslo, Norway. He was previously married to the New York artist and lawyer Rachel Jeanne Harris in 1999. Mueenuddin is the godson of Katherine Anne Porter, who was a friend of his mother. Porter died in 1980 and his mother became one of the trustees of the Porter literary estate.

== Bibliography ==
- Mueenuddin, Daniyal (2009). In Other Rooms, Other Wonders. W. W. Norton. ISBN 9780393337204.
- Mueenuddin, Daniyal (2026). This Is Where the Serpent Lives. Knopf. ISBN 9780525655152.

== See also ==
- List of Asian-American writers
