= David Macinnis Gill =

American YA author

- Born: 1963 (age 62–63)
- Occupation: Author
- Writing career
- Period: 1993—present
- Genres: Young adult fiction, science fiction, horror fiction, dystopian fiction
- Notable works: Rising Sun (2013); Shadow on the Sun (2013); Invisible Sun (2012); Black Hole Sun (2010); Soul Enchilada (2009)
- Website: www.davidmacinnisgill.com

David Macinnis Gill is an American author who writes for young adults.

== Career ==
Gill began his writing career by publishing short stories in small magazines, including The Crescent Review and Writer's Forum. In 2005, Scarecrow Press published his critical biography Graham Salisbury: Island Boy, a reference book intended for scholars of young adult literature. His debut novel, Soul Enchilada was published to acclaim in 2009. A second YA novel, Black Hole Sun, August 2010 has received a starred review from Booklist.

== Biography ==
Gill "has been a house painter, cafeteria manager, bookstore schleper, high school teacher, and college professor. He is represented by Rosemary Stimola of the Stimola Literary Studio.”

Gill started teaching in Chattanooga, Tennessee. After teaching at two different schools around the area, he moved on to the university environment. He was an assistant professor at Ohio University in the English department before he moved to the East Coast to be an associate professor at the University of North Carolina Wilmington in the English education department. David has a “bachelor’s degree in English/creative writing and a doctorate in education, both from the University of Tennessee, as well as an M.ED from Tennessee-Chattanooga.” He is the Past-President of ALAN (The Assembly on Literature for Adolescents), and has written and published everything from short stories to book reviews and critical essays.

== Works ==
=== Novels for Teens ===
- Shadow on the Sun (Greenwillow Books, an imprint of HarperCollins), 2013
- Invisible Sun (Greenwillow Books, an imprint of HarperCollins), 2012
- Black Hole Sun (Greenwillow Books, an imprint of HarperCollins), 2010
- Soul Enchilada (Greenwillow Books, an imprint of HarperCollins), 2009

=== Novels for Adults ===
- Tin City Tinder - A Boone Childress Novel 2014
- Steel City Smithereens - A Boone Childress Novel 2014
- Bronzeville Blowback - A Boone Childress Novel 2014
- Key Lime Die - A Boone Childress Novel 2014
- Boy Mercury - An Antebellum Adventure 2014 (serialized)
- Rural Voices: 15 Authors Challenge Assumptions About Small-Town America Praise The lord and pass the Little Debbies Novella 2020

=== Novellas ===
- Rising Sun (Greenwillow Books, an imprint of HarperCollins), 2013

=== Short stories ===
- Broken Circles & Other Stories collection (2014)
- "Broken Circles" (1993) – The Crescent Review
- "People's Song (1996) - Writers' Forum, v. 22, 1996, p. 66-73

=== Non-fiction ===
- Graham Salisbury: Island Boy (Scarecrow Press), 2005

=== Accolades ===
- A 2010 ALA Best Books for Young Adults (BBYA) for Soul Enchilada
- A Best of 2009 by Kirkus Reviews
- 2010 Stuff for the Teen Age by New York Public Library for Soul Encilada
- 2010 Bank Street College Best Books of the Year
