= Dan Chaon =

American writer

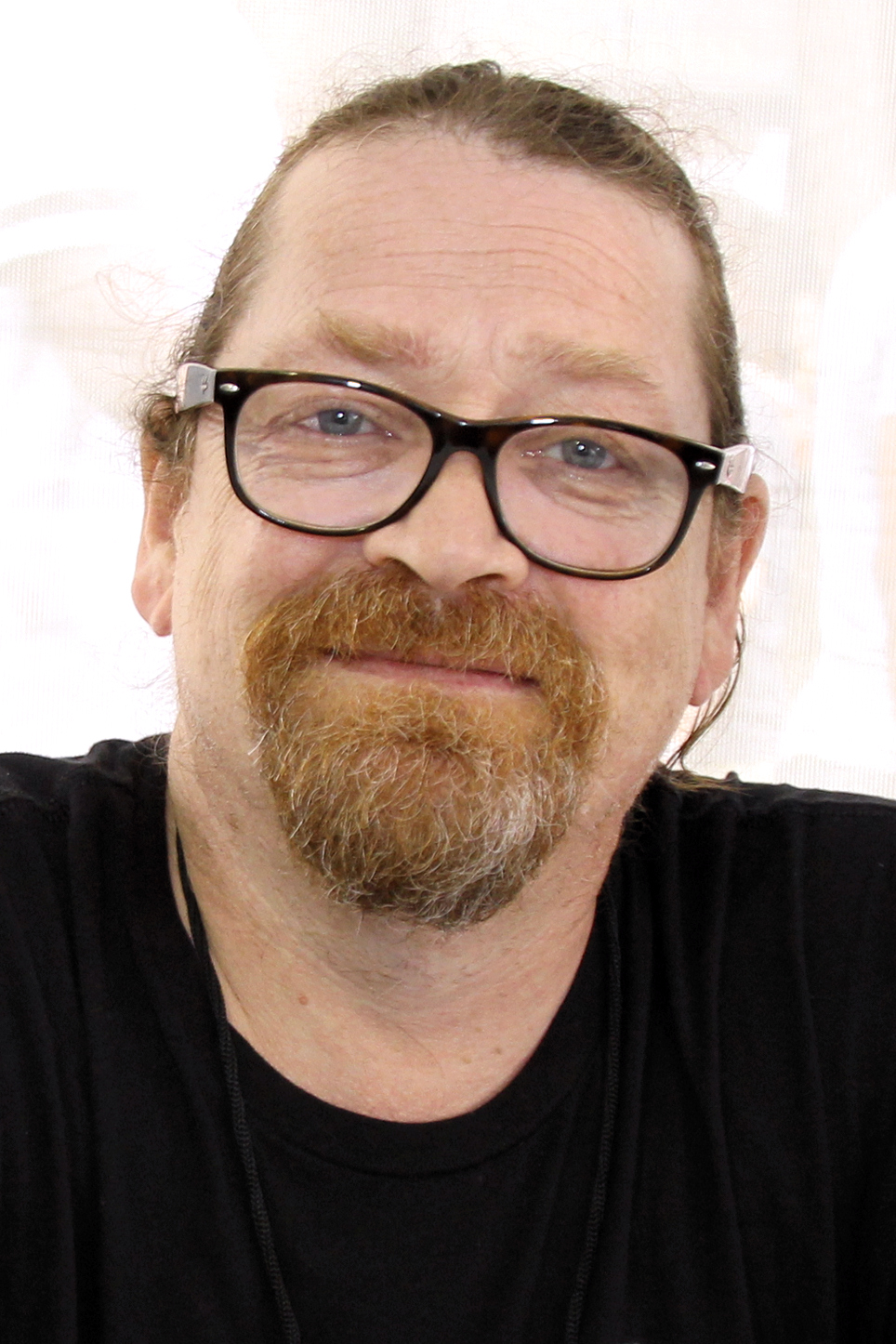
- Chaon at the 2017 Texas Book Festival
- Born: June 11, 1964 (age 62); Sidney, Nebraska
- Citizenship: United States
- Education: Northwestern University; Syracuse University
- Occupations: Novelist, short story writer
- Writing career
- Genre: Fiction
- Notable works: Ill Will; Await Your Reply; Among the Missing
- Notable awards: 2006 Academy Award for Literature, American Academy of Arts and Letters; Finalist, National Magazine Award in Fiction; Finalist, National Book Award
- Website: danchaon.net

Dan Chaon (born June 11, 1964) is an American writer. Formerly a creative writing professor, he is the author of three short story collections and five novels.

== Early life and education ==
Chaon was born June 11, 1964, in either Sidney, Nebraska or Omaha, Nebraska, and was the adopted son of Earl D. Chaon and Teresa N. (Tallmage) Chaon. His father was a construction worker and his mother a stay-at-home mom, neither of whom graduated from high school. He was the oldest of three siblings. He grew up in a village of 20 people outside of Sidney, Nebraska.

Chaon has said about his childhood, "I was a weird kid: bookish, imaginative, and not athletic." He was a voracious young reader: "At 10, I wanted to read The New Yorker." Foreshadowing some themes of his later writing, he noted, "I grew up on a steady diet of SF and horror and ghost stories, and that’s still a love of mine," and that as a teenager he "was fascinated by the serial killer novels that were popular" in the 1980s. Furthermore, he said, "I've written stories since I was a little kid." He credits his parents for their support: "I had parents who, however puzzled they were by my weirdness, were tolerant of it and loving."

As a thirteen-year-old, expanding on an assignment from his "really wonderful" seventh grade English teacher, Mr. Christy, Chaon wrote a fan letter to Ray Bradbury, and enclosed some of his own stories, "which were slavish imitations of Ray Bradbury stories." Chaon said, "The amazing thing was that Bradbury actually wrote back to me, praising the stories and offering a critique. Bradbury was full of kindness and hyperbole and told me that he thought I would soon be published. . . . This is when I decided that I was going to be a writer." Their correspondence continued for several years. Chaon credits Bradbury's encouragement for enabling his own writing career: "I happened upon a particularly generous spirit in Ray Bradbury, whose kindness put me on a track I might not have had the confidence to pursue otherwise."

Chaon earned a bachelor's degree from Northwestern University, where he originally intended to be a film major, in 1986. His professors at Northwestern included Sheila Schwartz, whom he would later marry, and Reginald Gibbons, whom he described as a "lifelong mentor" and who later published Chaon's first book. He went on to earn a master's degree from Syracuse University, where he studied with Tobias Wolff, in 1990.

== Employment ==
After his family moved to the Cleveland area in 1990 when his wife was appointed to a teaching position at Cleveland State University, Chaon worked as a stay-at-home father and took on a number of odd jobs, such as catering, bartending, construction, and work as an administrative assistant, until 1996 when his first short-story collection, Fitting Ends, was published.

Beginning in 1998, Chaon taught at Oberlin College, where he was the Pauline Delaney Professor of Creative Writing and Literature, before retiring in 2018. His former students include Ishmael Beah, Megan Kruse, Emma Straub, Rumaan Alam, Edan Lepucki and Lena Dunham.

== Published writing ==
Chaon has written four novels and three short story collections. His stories have appeared in numerous journals, and in anthologies including Best American Short Stories, The Pushcart Prize Anthologies, and The O. Henry Prize Stories.

His first collection was Fitting Ends and Other Stories, published in 1996.

Chaon's second collection of short stories, Among the Missing, was published in 2001. It was named as one of the year's ten best books by the American Library Association, and as a notable book of the year by The New York Times.

His first novel, You Remind Me of Me, was published in 2004.

A second novel, Await Your Reply, was published in 2009.

His third short story collection, Stay Awake, published in 2012, was a finalist for The Story Prize.

Chaon's third novel, Ill Will, published in 2017, was named one of the best books of the year by publications including The New York Times, the Los Angeles Times, and Publishers Weekly. It was nominated for a Shirley Jackson Award, Locus Award, and International Thriller Writers Award.

In 2022, Chaon published his fourth novel, Sleepwalk. He read from it on Storybound (podcast). Reviewing it for The New York Times Book Review, Joshua Ferris described the book as a "comic departure from the straightforward darkness of recent Chaon." He wrote that the book's plot was "Pynchonian" and "baroque", adding that "What prevails above the plot is the voice, which is consistently winning and — odd for so bloody a tale — unfailingly warm."

== Website Controversy ==
Chaon wrote in The Atlantic, in November 2022, that his former website, danchaon.com, had been taken over by someone else who posted a fake "official website of the writer" there, and he had been unable to remove it.

== Personal life ==
Chaon lives in Cleveland Heights, Ohio.

In about the mid-1990s, Chaon met his biological father through a DNA registry. He later said that, because his adoptive father was a construction worker and different in nature from Chaon, "I had this whole image of, if I were to ever find my biological parents, they would be very artistic. But my biological father is a construction worker—he's an electrician!"

Chaon married the writer Sheila Schwartz either in 1988 or on June 4, 1989. The two met when he was a nineteen-year-old undergraduate student at Northwestern, and she was his thirty-year-old writing professor. They were married for twenty years until her death of ovarian cancer in November 2008. They have two sons, Philip Chaon and Paul Chaon.

== Awards and recognition ==
- 1988 - Individual artist grantee, Illinois Arts Council
- 1989 - Raymond Carver Memorial Award, Syracuse University
- 1995 - individual artist grantee, Ohio Arts Council
- 1997 - Fiction award, Katherine and Lee Chilcote Foundation
- 1997-98 - A.B. Guthrie, Jr. Short Fiction Award (from CutBank) (for "Passengers, Remain Calm")
- 2000 - Pushcart Prize (for “The Illustrated Encyclopedia of the Animal Kingdom”)
- 2001 - O. Henry Prize, Second Place (for "Big Me")
- 2001 - Notable Book Award, American Library Association (for Among the Missing)
- 2001 - Finalist, National Book Award (for Among the Missing)
- 2002 - Pushcart Prize (for "Seven Types of Ambiguity")
- 2002 - Cleveland Arts Prize for Literature
- 2003 - Pushcart Prize (for “I Demand to Know Where You’re Taking Me”)
- 2006 - Arts and Letters Award in Literature, from the American Academy of Arts and Letters
- 2007 - Nominee, National Magazine Award, Fiction (to the Virginia Quarterly Review, for three writers' stories, including "Shepherdess")
- 2008 - Pushcart Prize (for "Shepherdess")
- 2012 - Finalist, Shirley Jackson Award for short fiction (for "Little America")
- 2012 - Finalist, the Story Prize (for Stay Awake)

== Bibliography ==
=== Novels ===
- You Remind Me of Me (2004)
- Await Your Reply (2009)
- Ill Will (2017)
- Sleepwalk (2022)
- One of Us (2025)

=== Short story collections ===
- Fitting Ends and Other Stories (TriQuarterly/Northwestern U. Press, 1995), reprinted 2003 by Ballantine Books, with two additional stories, as Fitting Ends
- Among the Missing (2001)
- Stay Awake (2012)

=== Stories published in anthologies ===
- “Fitting Ends,” in Best American Short Stories 1996, ed. John Edgar Wideman and Katrina Kenison (1996)
- “The Illustrated Encyclopedia of the Animal Kingdom,” in The Pushcart Prize 24: Best of the Small Presses, ed. Bill Henderson (2000)
- “Big Me,” in 2001 O. Henry Prize Stories [second-place story], ed. Larry Dark (2001)
- "Seven Types of Ambiguity," in The Pushcart Prize 26: Best of the Small Presses, ed. Bill Henderson (2002)
- “I Demand to Know Where You’re Taking Me,” in The Pushcart Prize 27: Best of the Small Presses, ed. Bill Henderson (2003)
- "The Bees," in Best American Short Stories 2003, ed. Walter Mosley and Katrina Kenison (2003)
- "Shepherdess," in The Pushcart Prize 32: Best of the Small Presses, ed. Bill Henderson (2008)
- "Little America," in Shadow Show: All-New Stories in Celebration of Ray Bradbury, ed. Sam Weller & Mort Castle (2012)

(Of these eight stories, the first was included in *Fitting Ends and Other Stories; the second, third, and fifth in Among the Missing; and the sixth and seventh in Stay Awake.)
