= Don Nilsen =

American linguist and humor scholar (born 1934)

Don Lee Fred Nilsen
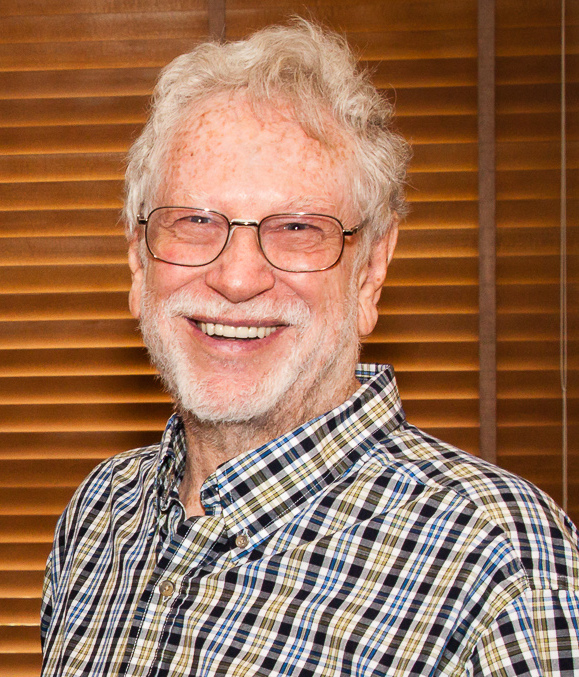
- Don Nilsen (2015)
- Born: October 19, 1934 (age 91); Palmyra, Utah, U.S.
- Known for: Founding the International Society for Humor Studies
- Title: Professor Emeritus
- Spouse: Alleen Pace Nilsen

Academic background
- Education: University of Michigan
- Thesis: (1971)

Academic work
- Discipline: Linguist
- Institutions: Arizona State University, State University of New York, Oswego, University of Pittsburgh, University of Northern Iowa, Kabul University
- Main interests: Humor studies, case grammar
- Notable works: Encyclopedia of 20th-Century American Humor
- Website: http://www.public.asu.edu/~dnilsen/

Don Lee Fred Nilsen (born October 19, 1934) is an American linguist and humor scholar. He is Professor of Linguistics in the emeritus College at Arizona State University. He has published extensively on semantics, deep cases, and humor. Together with his wife Alleen Nilsen, Nilsen is co-founder of the International Society for Humor Studies and served as its executive secretary. Alongside Alleen Nilsen, he was also co-president of American Name Society.

== Work ==
Don Lee Fred Nilsen was born in 1934 in Palmyra, Utah, United States. He obtained his bachelor's degree in French from Brigham Young University in 1958, followed by a master's degree in linguistics from American University in 1961, and a PhD in linguistics from the University of Michigan in 1971. Since 1971, he has worked at Arizona State University.

Don Nilsen's areas of interest in English Linguistics include Semantics, Pragmatics, and Discourse Theory. He has a particular interest in sophisticated discourse forms: Double Entendre, Symbolism, Metaphor, Irony, Parody, Paradox, Wit, Symbolism, Humor, Comedy and Tragi-comedy.

Together with his wife Alleen Nilsen, Nilsen founded the International Society for Humor Studies. Nilsen served as executive secretary of the organization until 2005 and is still the organization's historian. In 2014, the Association of Applied and Therapeutic Humor named Don and Alleen Nilsen recipients of the Doug Fletcher Lifetime Achievement Award for their significant contribution to the understanding and application of humor.

== Select bibliography ==
- The instrumental case in English: syntactic and semantic considerations (1973) Mouton
- Language Play: An Introduction to Linguistics (w/ Alleen Nilsen) (1978) Newbury House Publishers
- Humor in American Literature: A Selected Annotated Bibliography (1992) Routledge
- Humor in Irish Literature: A Reference Guide (1996) Greenwood Press
- Humor in Eighteenth- and Nineteenth-century British Literature (1998) Greenwood Press
- Encyclopedia of 20th-century American Humor (w/ Alleen Nilsen) (2000) Oryx Press
- The Language of Humor: An Introduction (w/ Alleen Nilsen) (2018) Cambridge University Press
