= The Secret Lives of Church Ladies =

2020 short story collection by Deesha Philyaw

- Author: Deesha Philyaw
- Language: English
- Genre: Literary fiction, short story
- Published: 2020
- Publication place: United States
- Media type: Print
- Pages: 192 (paperback first edition)
- ISBN: 978-1-949199-73-4

The Secret Lives of Church Ladies is a debut short story collection by Deesha Philyaw. The book consists of nine stories about Black women, church, and sexuality and was released on September 1, 2020 by West Virginia University Press. It was a finalist for the 2020 National Book Award for Fiction and received The Story Prize, the Los Angeles Times Book Prize, and the PEN/Faulkner Award for Fiction.

== Plot ==
The collection consists of nine stories that explore the intersection of sexuality and Christianity. Black women protagonists appear in each story. Topics covered include infidelity, casual sex, and lesbian relationships.

== Background ==
The title refers to the catch-all term for church-going women that Philyaw learned growing up. These women were prim, conservatively dressed, and were those "who [made] sure not a hair is out of place, never [spoke] out of line, and [did] all the right Godly things."

Philyaw stated in an interview with Richmond Free Press, "I see the book as centering Black women in their own stories of the tug of war they experience between their desires and what they may have learned at church."

Philyaw was born and raised in Jacksonville, Florida. She was raised attending church and attended services under the denominations of AME, Baptist, Pentecostal, COGIC, and Missionary Baptist Church. Philyaw drew on those experience to write about how the church space influences female sexuality. She no longer attends church services but has fond memories of that time.

The collection was rejected for publication by several publishers and presses, including the Big Five, before it was acquired by West Virginia University Press.

== Reception ==
=== Commercial success ===
The book is West Virginia University Press's most commercially successful in its history. It sold 30,000 copies in six months.

=== Critical reception ===
Marion Wink reviewed the book for Star Tribune and stated: "This collection marks the emergence of a bona fide literary treasure." Wendeline O. Wright further praised Philyaw in Pittsburgh Post-Gazette: "“The Secret Lives of Church Ladies” is an unforgettable look inside the hearts of Black women as they evaluate their relationships — with God, their families, and themselves."

Kirkus wrote in a starred review, "No saints exist in these pages, just full-throated, flesh-and-blood women who embrace and redefine love, and their own selves, in powerfully imperfect renditions. Tender, fierce, proudly Black and beautiful, these stories will sneak inside you and take root." In a similarly positive review, Publishers Weekly wrote, "Philyaw’s stories inform and build on one another, turning her characters’ private struggles into a beautiful chorus." The nuanced characters were further praised by Jordan Snowden, who described Philyaw's writing in Pittsburgh City Paper: "She shows these women, these Black women, in spaces they aren’t usually seen — having sex in a parking lot, in same-sex relationships, going to therapy, as a person filled with longing and desire."

== Awards and nominations ==
- 2020 – National Book Award for Fiction, Finalist
- 2020 – The Story Prize, Winner
- 2020 – Los Angeles Times Book Prize, Art Seidenbaum Award for First Fiction, Winner
- 2021 – PEN/Faulkner Award for Fiction, Winner
- 2021 – The L.D. and LaVerne Harrell Clark Fiction Prize, Longlist

== TV adaptation ==
In January 2021, it was announced that Tessa Thompson's newly formed production company, Viva Maude, had picked up the collection to be adapted for television. Philyaw is slated to write the adaptation and co-executive produce with Thompson. Tori Sampson will also co-write and co-executive produce.

== Publication history ==
- 2020. United States, West Virginia University Press, ISBN 978-1-949199-73-4, Pub date 1 September 2020, Paperback. (Note: Some of the stories were published previously before being selected for the collection.)

== See also ==
- African and African-American women in Christianity
