= Bennett Sims (author) =

American novelist

- Born: Baton Rouge, Louisiana, U.S.
- Education: Pomona College; Iowa Writers' Workshop
- Occupations: Writer, novelist

Bennett Sims is an American fiction writer. He has published the novel A Questionable Shape (2013) and the short story collections White Dialogues and Other Minds and Other Stories. He is an assistant professor at the University of Iowa.

== Early life and education ==
Sims was born and raised in Baton Rouge, Louisiana. During high school, he spent three summers at the New Orleans Center for Creative Arts' boarding program, where he wrote fiction. In 2008, he graduated from Pomona College, where he was mentored by David Foster Wallace. He later graduated from the Iowa Writers' Workshop, where he was a Truman Capote Fellow, and he served as a Provost's Postgraduate Visiting Writer at the University of Iowa in 2012-2013.

== Career ==
Sims's debut novel, A Questionable Shape, was published by Two Dollar Radio on May 1, 2013. It won the 2014 Bard Fiction Prize, which included $30,000 and a semester-long writer-in-residence appointment at Bard College.

Many reviews called the book a novel with zombies that is not a zombie novel. It is set in Louisiana and opaquely references the aftermath of Hurricane Katrina. It received generally favorable reviews from media outlets, including The Guardian, Electric Literature, the Los Angeles Review of Books, and Publishers Weekly.

In 2017, Sims published his second book, the short story collection White Dialogues, with Two Dollar Radio. It received favorable reviews from Publishers Weekly, Kirkus Reviews, and Bookforum. Sims was a Rome Prize Fellow at the American Academy in Rome in 2018-2019, where he worked on another novel.

Sims's stories have been published in The Iowa Review, Story, Conjunctions, Ploughshares, and the Pushcart Prize Anthology.

Other Minds and Other Stories was a finalist for The Story Prize.

Sims teaches undergraduate fiction courses at the University of Iowa.
