= Praying Drunk =

- Author: Kyle Minor
- Language: English
- Published: 2014 by Sarabande Books
- Publication place: United States
- Pages: 192 pp
- ISBN: 9781936747634

Praying Drunk is a collection of twelve short stories by Kyle Minor. The book was published in 2014 by Sarabande Books.

== Reception ==
Reception to Praying Drunk has commonly noted how although the book is a collection of stories, the reader is strongly encouraged to read the stories consecutively. According to Kirkus Reviews, the stories together "present a powerful reflective narrative, offering perspectives on friends, family and faith."

Praying Drunk was reviewed by The New York Times Book Review on April 25, 2014 by Nicholas Mancusi. Mancusi writes: "Minor’s book is less a collection than an extended prayer, wrenched from the heart and wrought in the language of pain." He also notes that "beyond a certain threshold of grief and misery, the artistic returns diminish." Both Kirkus Reviews and The Boston Globe name "In a Distant Country" as the most affecting story in the collection.

In January 2015, it was awarded The Story Prize Spotlight Award, which honors a short story collection worthy of additional attention.
