= Floyd Skloot =

American poet

- Born: July 6, 1947 (age 79); New York City, U.S.
- Education: Franklin & Marshall College (BA); Southern Illinois University (MA)
- Spouses: Beverly Hallberg (1993-)
- Children: Rebecca Skloot
- Writing career
- Language: English
- Years active: 1990 to present
- Genres: Essays, poetry, fiction, memoir
- Notable work: In the Shadow of Memory
- Notable awards: PEN USA Literary Award in Creative Nonfiction 2004
- Website: www.floydskloot.com

Floyd Skloot (born July 6, 1947) is an American poet, novelist, and memoirist. Some of his work concerns his experience with neurological damage caused by a virus contracted in 1988.

His book In the Shadow of Memory gained favorable critical notice, leading to more reviews of the following book, A World of Light, for the quality of his writing and for the new life he created after illness. His poetry is published in general circulation and literary magazines.

== Early life and education ==
Floyd Skloot was born July 6, 1947, in Brooklyn, New York. His parents were Harry and Lillian, née Rosen. Skloot received a B.A from Franklin & Marshall College in Lancaster, Pennsylvania and an M.A. in English at Southern Illinois University, where he studied with the Irish poet Thomas Kinsella. In 2006, Franklin & Marshall College awarded him an Honorary Doctor of Humane Letters degree. After living in New York and places in the Midwest, Skloot moved to Portland, Oregon in 1984. He worked as a public policy analyst for 16 years.

== Personal life ==
Skloot's memoir In the Shadow of Memory gained high praise in a review by Julia Keller, who said "the glory of Skloot's prose is that, even when it is lush and seemingly digressive, it is ruggedly specific." Her only criticism was his reliance on experts other than himself, as his "insights are not available in textbooks or seminars. And they grace this powerful and anguished book, this elegy to a lost mind."

The next memoir, A World of Light, was reviewed by Mark Essig, who noted that the series of essays covered Skloot's present life, visiting his mother who is altered by Altzheimer's Disease, and recollecting his own childhood events, demonstrates that "Skloot knows something of grace, but he has left failure far behind. He has painstakingly rebuilt his life and his art, shaping the experience of crippling illness into dazzling literature." A subsequent memoir, Revertigo: An Off-Kilter Memoir, comprising 14 essays previously published in literary journals, evoked praise from Suzanne Koven, who says that "His essays weave smoothly through pivotal episodes in his life as a son, father, reader, writer, husband, and patient." Another reviewer, Claire Dederer, praises the last portion of the book which focuses directly on the physical experience of vertigo, saying it is "an elegant meditation on balance, aging, helplessness, dependency and, especially, love." She does not find that the metaphor of vertigo works well for the entire book.

His recent poetry collections are The End of Dreams (2006), The Snow's Music (2008), and Approaching Winter (2015), all from Louisiana State University Press; Close Reading (2014) from Eyewear Publishing in the UK; and Selected Poems: 1970-2005 from Tupelo Press (2008).

Skloot has contributed to publications including The New York Times Magazine, The Atlantic Monthly, Harper's, Poetry, The Sewanee Review, Southern Review, Boulevard, Virginia Quarterly Review, The Hopkins Review, Hudson Review, and Southwest Review. Reviews of his books have appeared in the Boston Globe, The New York Times, the Chicago Tribune and Harvard Review. Skloot and his daughter co-edited The Best American Science Writing 2011 for HarperCollins/Ecco, published in September 2011. He published his first collection of short stories in 2011, Cream of Kohlrabi, from Tupelo Press.

His most recent novel, The Phantom of Thomas Hardy, was published in October 2016 by the University of Wisconsin Press. It is a literary romp through Dorsetshire and Hardy's tangled love life with a gateway between real and imagined lives. Floyd, an American writer, and his wife, Beverly, are pondering the enigma of a fictional character living in a factual building when Floyd is approached by Hardy himself—despite his death in 1928. Jeanne Marie Laskas says that "Only the inventive Floyd Skloot could come up with—and gorgeously pull off—an experiment like The Phantom of Thomas Hardy. With the intensity of a fevered dream, he seeks his own self-integration after brain trauma while digging around, assembling, and imagining the history of the elusive Hardy. Blending memoir, reportage, literary analysis, and historical fiction (who does that?) Skloot dazzles with the depth of his research, and enchants with his signature vivid, precise, and thoroughly delicious prose." National Book Review was impressed by "how flawlessly he integrates researched material into his fiction and nonfiction." and commends his "enviable ability to combine biography and personal narrative" in the scheme of a mystery novel. Kirkus Reviews was not as impressed, saying "A sporadically insightful, intermittently entertaining blend of memoir, literary history, and fabulist speculation."

== Honors and awards ==
He received The Emily Clark Balch Prize in Poetry in 2000 from Virginia Quarterly Review.

His work was included in The Penguin Book of the Sonnet, published in 2001.

His awards include the PEN USA Literary Award in Creative Nonfiction in 2004 for In the Shadow of Memory. In 2004, he was a Rockefeller Foundation Fellow in residence at their Study Center in Bellagio, Italy. In the Shadow of Memory was named the Best Nonfiction Book of 2003 by the Chicago Tribune.

In May 2006 he received an honorary Doctor of Humane Letters degree from his alma mater, Franklin & Marshall College.

His piece A Measure of Acceptance was included in The Touchstone Anthology of Contemporary Creative Nonfiction,

He received three Pushcart Prizes in 2009 and two other years, the Independent Publishers Book Award in Creative Nonfiction, two Pacific Northwest Booksellers Awards in Poetry, and two Oregon Book Awards.

In January 2010, Skloot was listed by Poets & Writers as "one of fifty of the most inspiring authors in the world;" he was described by this sentence: "Despite virus-induced brain damage, he writes with surprising tenderness and candor about recreating a life for himself and, in the process, makes us think about our own." Also in 2010, his article The Melody lingers on was included in The Best of The Best American Science Writing, a book whose entries were selected by the editors of the first ten books published in The Best American Science Writing series.

He was honored with the McGinnis-Ritchie Award from Southwest Review in 2016 for his essay La Serenata and in a prior year.

He has also been a finalist for the Barnes & Noble Discover Award in Nonfiction, the PEN/Diamonstein-Spielvogel Award for the Art of the Essay, and the Paterson Poetry Prize.

He received awards from Creative Nonfiction Magazine, Prairie Schooner, and other publications.

His work has been included twice each in The Best American Essays in 1993 and 2000, The Best American Science Writing in 2000 and 2003, and The Best Spiritual Writing, and three times in The Best Food Writing in 2011 annual anthologies.

Works by Floyd Skloot were included in The Art of the Essay.

== Written works ==
=== Creative nonfiction ===
- The Night-Side: Chronic Fatigue Syndrome and The Illness Experience, Story Line Press, 1996.
- In the Shadow of Memory, University of Nebraska Press, 2003. Reprinted in UNP's Bison Books paperback series in 2004.
- The World of Light, University of Nebraska Press, 2005. Reprinted in UNP's Bison Books paperback series in 2011.
- The Wink of the Zenith: The Shaping of a Writer's Life, University of Nebraska Press, 2008. Reprinted in UNP's Bison Books paperback series in 2011.
- Revertigo: An Off-Kilter Memoir, University of Wisconsin Press, 2014.

=== Poetry collections ===
- Music Appreciation, University Press of Florida, 1994.
- The Fiddler's Trance, Bucknell University Press, 2001.
- The Evening Light, Story Line Press, 2001.
- Approximately Paradise, Tupelo Press, 2005.
- The End of Dreams, Louisiana State University Press, 2006.
- Selected Poems: 1970-2005, Tupelo Press, 2008.
- The Snow's Music, Louisiana State University Press, 2008.
- Close Reading, Eyewear Publishing, UK, 2014.
- Approaching Winter, Louisiana State University Press, 2015.
- Far West, Louisiana State University Press, tentatively scheduled for 2019

=== Fiction ===
Novels

- Pilgrim's Harbor, Story Line Press, 1992.
- Summer Blue, Story Line Press, 1994.
- The Open Door, Story Line Press, 1997.
- Patient 002, Rager Media, 2007.
- The Phantom of Thomas Hardy, University of Wisconsin Press, 2016.

Short stories

- Cream of Kohlrabi, Tupelo Press, 2011.

== As editor ==
- The Best American Science Writing 2011, co-edited with Rebecca Skloot, HarperCollins/Ecco Press, September 2011
