= Peter Filkins =

American poet and literary translator

Peter Filkins is an American poet and literary translator. Filkins graduated from Williams College with a Bachelor of Arts and from Columbia University with a Master of Fine Arts degree. His poetry collections include the forthcoming Water / Music, as well as The View We’re Granted, co-winner of the 2013 Sheila Motton Best Book Award from the New England Poetry Club, and Augustine’s Vision, winner of the 2009 New American Press Chapbook Award. His poems, essays, reviews, and translations have appeared in numerous journals, including The New Republic, Partisan Review, The New Criterion, Poetry, The Yale Review, the New York Times Book Review, and the Los Angeles Times. He is a recipient of a 2005 Berlin Prize from the American Academy in Berlin, a 2015-2016 National Endowment for the Humanities Fellowship, a 2014 Leon Levy Center for Biography Fellowship, and a Fulbright Fellowship to Austria. In 2012 he was writer-in-residence at the James Merrill House, and he has held residencies at The MacDowell Colony, Yaddo, and the Millay Colony for the Arts.

Filkins has also translated several books of postwar German literature into English. His translation of Ingeborg Bachmann’s collected poems, Songs in Flight, received an Outstanding Translation Award in 1995 from the American Literary Translators Association and was reissued in an expanded second edition titled Darkness Spoken, which received a Distinguished Translation Award from the Austrian Ministry for Education, Art, and Culture in 2007. Filkins was the first to translate H. G. Adler's novels into English. The Journey, Panorama, and The Wall, the three novels Filkins translated, were written soon after the war, but were not published until the 1962, 1968, and 1988, respectively. Filkins' translation of Panorama was listed as one of the best books of 2011 by The New Republic's editorial staff. and The Wall was named a Best Book of the Year for 2014 by Publishers Weekly. His biography, H.G. Adler: A Life in Many Worlds, was published by Oxford University Press in March 2019.

Filkins has taught literature and writing at Bard College at Simon's Rock since 1988 and translation at the main campus of Bard College since 2006.

Filkins was awarded a Guggenheim Fellowship in April 2022.

== Bibliography ==
Poetry

- Filkins, Peter (1998). What She Knew. Orchises Press. ISBN 978-0-914061-66-3.
- Filkins, Peter (2002). After Homer. George Braziller. ISBN 978-0807615058.
- Filkins, Peter (2010). Augustine's Vision. New American Press. ISBN 978-0-9817802-9-0.
- Filkins, Peter (2012). The View We're Granted. Johns Hopkins. ISBN 978-1421406329.
- Filkins, Peter (2021). Water / Music. Johns Hopkins. ISBN 978-1421440088.

Literary translations

- Bachmann, Ingeborg (1994). Songs in Flight: The Collected Poems of Ingeborg Bachmann. Marsilio Pub. ISBN 978-1-56886-009-1. Trans. Peter Filkins
- Bachmann, Ingeborg (1999). The Book of Franza & Requiem for Fanny Goldmann. Northwestern University Press. ISBN 978-0-8101-1204-9. Trans. Peter Filkins
- Hotschnig, Alois (1999). Leonardo's Hands. University of Nebraska Press. ISBN 978-0-8032-2387-5. Trans. Peter Filkins
- Bachmann, Ingeborg (2006). Darkness Spoken. Zephyr Press. ISBN 978-0-939010-84-4. Trans. Peter Filkins
- Adler, H. G. (2008). The Journey: A Novel. Random House. ISBN 978-1-4000-6673-5. Trans. Peter Filkins
- Adler, H. G. (2011). Panorama: A Novel. Random House. ISBN 978-1-4000-6851-7. Trans. Peter Filkins
- Stiegler, Bernd (2013). Traveling in Place. U of Chicago P. ISBN 978-0-226-77467-1. Trans. Peter Filkins
- Adler, H.G. (2014). The Wall. Random House. ISBN 978-0-8129-9306-6. Trans. Peter Filkins

Biography

- Filkins, Peter (2019). H.G. Adler: A Life in Many Worlds. Oxford University Press. ISBN 978-0-19-022238-3.
