= Lee K. Abbott =

American writer (1947–2019)

- Born: Panama Canal Zone
- Died: April 29, 2019 (aged 71)
- Education: New Mexico State University; University of Arkansas (MFA)
- Occupations: Writer; Professor
- Spouse: Pamela Jo Dennis
- Awards: National Endowment for the Arts x2; Major Artist Fellowship; 2004 Alumni Distinguished Teaching Award

Lee Kittredge Abbott (October 17, 1947 – April 29, 2019) was an American writer. He was the author of seven collections of short stories and was a professor emeritus of English at the Ohio State University in Columbus.

== Life ==
Abbott was born October 17, 1947, in the Panama Canal Zone. His father, a colonel in the Army, at last settled his family in Las Cruces, New Mexico. The stark desert landscape would become very important in Abbott's fiction.

Abbott received bachelor's and master's degrees from New Mexico State University. After studying at Columbia College, he earned his Master of Fine Arts from the University of Arkansas in 1977. In addition to lecturing on the art of fiction writing, Abbott has taught at several colleges, starting as an assistant professor of English at Case Western Reserve University in 1977. At CWRU, he earned tenure and was promoted to associate professor in 1983, then full professor in 1987, and in 1988 was named The Samuel B. & Virginia C. Knight Professor of Humanities. He took several leaves of absence to teach elsewhere, including Colorado College (1984), Washington University in St. Louis (Spring 1985), and Rice University (Spring 1988.) In 1989, he became a professor of English at Ohio State University, where he taught until his retirement in 2012. In 2007 OSU promoted him to Humanities Distinguished Professor. He has also taught as a writer in residence or visiting faculty at Wichita State University, Southwest Texas State University, Yale University, Antioch College, Old Dominion University, Miami University, and the University of Michigan. Known as a dynamic and engaging teacher, students gave him consistently excellent reviews. After retiring to his native New Mexico, he was named distinguished visiting professor within the English department of his alma mater, New Mexico State University.

His many short stories and reviews, as well as articles on American literature and popular culture, have appeared in such journals and magazines as Harper's, The Atlantic Monthly, The Georgia Review, The New York Times Book Review, The Southern Review, Epoch, Boulevard, Crawdaddy, and The North American Review. His fiction has been often reprinted in The Best American Short Stories and The Prize Stories: The O'Henry Awards. He has twice won fellowships from the National Endowment for the Arts, and was awarded a Major Artist Fellowship from the Ohio Arts Council in 1991. He was also recipient of the 2004 Alumni Distinguished Teaching Award. His latest collection of stories, All Things, All at Once: New & Selected Stories, was published by Norton in June 2006.

Lee Abbott died from cancer on April 29, 2019, at the age of 71.

== Writing ==
Although he made occasional attempts at novel writing, Abbott devoted himself almost exclusively to the craft of the short story. In 2012, when asked why he never went on to complete a novel, he replied, "...whenever I've gone longer than is my custom, I feel that I'm lying. I know only two things: the genius of story is its brevity; and, story succeeds by what it leaves out."

Character development was particularly important to Abbott. On that subject—in interviews, the classroom, darkened halls, and din-crammed pubs—he loved to quote the cult film Buckaroo Banzai, " 'Character is what we are in the dark.' ... It's the smartest line of literary criticism I've ever heard. While things can be learned about what a character wears, where she might live, the car she drives, those sorts of thing are not newsworthy to me. To me, characters are your dreams, your fears, your hopes, and your secrets—the kinds of things that I wouldn't know looking over at you at a stop light."

Abbott humorously categorized his own stories into four categories: "boy-girl stories, father-son stories, buddy stories, and, rarely, something I call my "trash compactor" stories. Those are like Walt Whitman meets Apocalypse Now and Mad Max. I've only published about four or five of them. They're just a chance for me to use up great lines and material, and to be a bit wacky." The often anthologized "The Era of Great Numbers", first published in Dreams of Distant Lives (1990), is perhaps his best known and most extravagant "trash compactor" story.

Abbott's many influences included Flannery O'Connor, William Faulkner, Eudora Welty, Joan Didion, John Casey, and R.V. Cassill. Although Abbott arrived on the fiction scene during a time when minimalism was in fashion, critic William Giraldi said of Abbott's debut, "The Heart Never Fits Its Wanting is an orgy of style, one that performs the magic trick of being at once inebriated and exact—his narrators akin to world-class drinkers who can down a fifth of Jim Beam and still stand straight."

== Works ==
=== Fiction ===
==== Collections ====
- The Heart Never Fits Its Wanting: Stories (1980)
- Love is the Crooked Thing (1986)
- Strangers in Paradise (1986)
- Dreams of Distant Lives (1990)
- Living After Midnight (1991)
- Wet Places at Noon (1997)
- All Things, All at Once: New and Selected Stories (2006)

=== Chapbooks ===
- One of Star Wars, One of Doom (2007)

=== Contributions to other collections ===
- The Company of Dogs ("Where is Garland Steeples Now?") (1990)
- The Grateful Dead Reader ("Dead Reckoning and Hamburger Metaphysics") (2000)
- The Putt at the End of the World (Chapter Four: "Never Up, Never In") (2001)
- Letters to J. D. Salinger (2002)
- Scoring from Second: Writers on Baseball (Foreword) (2007)
