= The Story Prize =

Annual book award for short fiction

The Story Prize is an annual book award established in 2004 that honors the author of an outstanding collection of short fiction with a $20,000 cash award. Each of two runners-up receives $5,000. Eligible books must be written in English and first published in the United States during a calendar year. The founder of the prize is Julie Lindsey, and the director is Larry Dark. He was previously series editor for the annual short story anthology Prize Stories: The O. Henry Awards from 1997 to 2002.

The Story Prize generally receives as entries 100 to 120 short story collections each year. The Director and Founder together choose the three finalists. Three independent judges choose the winner from among those books. The judging group has a different composition every year and consists of a mix of writers, booksellers, readers, critics, teachers, publishers, and editors. One judge is always a fiction writer, a second judge is either a bookseller or librarian in alternating years, and the third is generally a critic or editor or someone else associated with the short story.

Publishers, authors, or agents may enter a short story collection written in English by a living author and published in the U.S. during a calendar year. Three finalists are announced in January. These authors participate in an award event, typically in March, at which they read from their work and have an on-stage discussion with Dark. At the end of the event, Julie Lindsey announces the winner, who, in addition to the prize money, receives an engraved silver bowl. From 2006 to 2020 the event was at the New School in New York City (co-sponsored with the Creative Writing Department). In 2021, the event was recorded via Zoom, and it has since been held at The Lotos Club.

In March 2019, Catapult published The Story Prize: 15 Years of Great Short Fiction, an anthology celebrating the award's fifteenth anniversary.

== Recipients ==
Story Prize winners and finalists
Year	Author	Title	Result
2004	Edwidge Danticat	The Dew Breaker	Winner
2004	Cathy Day	The Circus in Winter	Finalist
2004	Joan Silber	Ideas of Heaven	Finalist
2005	Patrick O'Keeffe	The Hill Road	Winner
2005	Jim Harrison	The Summer He Didn't Die	Finalist
2005	Maureen F. McHugh	Mothers and Other Monsters	Finalist
2006	Mary Gordon	The Stories of Mary Gordon	Winner
2006	Rick Bass	The Lives of Rocks	Finalist
2006	George Saunders	In Persuasion Nation	Finalist
2007	Jim Shepard	Like You'd Understand, Anyway	Winner
2007	Tessa Hadley	Sunstroke and Other Stories	Finalist
2007	Vincent Lam	Bloodletting & Miraculous Cures	Finalist
2008	Tobias Wolff	Our Story Begins	Winner
2008	Jhumpa Lahiri	Unaccustomed Earth	Finalist
2008	Joe Meno	Demons in the Spring	Finalist
2009	Daniyal Mueenuddin	In Other Rooms, Other Wonders	Winner
2009	Victoria Patterson	Drift	Finalist
2009	Wells Tower	Everything Ravaged, Everything Burned	Finalist
2010	Anthony Doerr	Memory Wall	Winner
2010	Yiyun Li	Gold Boy, Emerald Girl	Finalist
2010	Suzanne Rivecca	Death Is Not an Option	Finalist
2011	Steven Millhauser	We Others	Winner
2011	Don DeLillo	The Angel Esmeralda	Finalist
2011	Edith Pearlman	Binocular Vision	Finalist
2012	Claire Vaye Watkins	Battleborn	Winner
2012	Dan Chaon	Stay Awake	Finalist
2012	Junot Díaz	This Is How You Lose Her	Finalist
2013	George Saunders	Tenth of December	Winner
2013	Andrea Barrett	Archangel	Finalist
2013	Rebecca Lee	Bobcat	Finalist
2014	Elizabeth McCracken	Thunderstruck	Winner
2014	Francesca Marciano	The Other Language	Finalist
2014	Lorrie Moore	Bark	Finalist
2015	Adam Johnson	Fortune Smiles	Winner
2015	Charles Baxter	There’s Something I Want You to Do	Finalist
2015	Colum McCann	Thirteen Ways of Looking	Finalist
2016	Rick Bass	For a Little While	Winner
2016	Anna Noyes	Goodnight, Beautiful Women	Finalist
2016	Helen Maryles Shankman	They Were Like Family to Me (published in hardcover as In the Land of Armadillos)	Finalist
2017	Elizabeth Strout	Anything Is Possible	Winner
2017	Daniel Alarcón	The King Is Always Above the People	Finalist
2017	Ottessa Moshfegh	Homesick for Another World	Finalist
2018	Lauren Groff	Florida	Winner
2018	Jamel Brinkley	A Lucky Man	Finalist
2018	Deborah Eisenberg	Your Duck Is My Duck	Finalist
2019	Edwidge Danticat	Everything Inside	Winner
2019	Kali Fajardo-Anstine	Sabrina & Corina	Finalist
2019	Zadie Smith	Grand Union	Finalist
2020	Deesha Philyaw	The Secret Lives of Church Ladies	Winner
2020	Sarah Shun-lien Bynum	Likes	Finalist
2020	Danielle Evans	The Office of Historical Corrections	Finalist
2021	Brandon Taylor	Filthy Animals	Winner
2021	Lily King	Five Tuesdays in Winter	Finalist
2021	J. Robert Lennon	Let Me Think	Finalist
2022	Ling Ma	Bliss Montage	Winner
2022	Andrea Barrett	Natural History	Finalist
2022	Morgan Talty	Night of the Living Rez	Finalist
2024	Paul Yoon	The Hive and the Honey	Winner
2024	Yiyun Li	Wednesday's Child	Finalist
2024	Bennett Sims	Other Minds and Other Stories	Finalist
2025	Fiona McFarlane	Highway 13	Winner
2025	Ruben Reyes Jr.	There Is a Rio Grande in Heaven	Finalist
2025	Jessi Jezewska Stevens	Ghost Pains	Finalist
2026	André Alexis	Other Worlds	Winner
2026	Lydia Millet	Atavists	Finalist
2026	Ayşegül Savaş	Long Distance	Finalist

== The Story Prize Spotlight Award ==
This $1,000 award is given to a short story collection of exceptional merit, as selected by the Director of the Story Prize, from among all entrants. Winners of The Story Prize Spotlight Award might be promising works by first-time authors, collections in alternative formats, or works that demonstrate an unusual perspective on the writers’ craft.

Year	Winner	Work	Ref.
2012	Krys Lee	Drifting House	
2013	Ben Stroud	Byzantium	
2014	Kyle Minor	Praying Drunk	
2015	Adrian Tomine	Killing and Dying	
2016	Randa Jarrar	Him, Me, Muhammad Ali	
2017	Lee Conell	Subcortical	
2018	Akil Kumarasamy	Half Gods	
2019	Ayşe Papatya Bucak	The Trojan War Museum	
2020	Asako Serizawa	Inheritors	
2021	Adam Thompson	Born into This	
2022	Arinze Ifeakandu	God's Children Are Little Broken Things	
2023	SJ Sindu	The Goth House Experiment	
2024	Ben Shattuck	The History of Sound	
2025	John Haskell	Trying to Be	
