= John Haskell (author) =

American novelist

- Born: February 10, 1958 (age 68)
- Occupations: Novelist, essayist, short-story writer
- Website: www.johnhaskell.net

John Haskell (born February 10, 1958) is an American writer and editor.

He is the author of two short-story collections, Trying to Be (UAP, 2025) and I Am Not Jackson Pollock (FSG, 2003), and the novels The Complete Ballet (Graywolf Press, 2017), Out of My Skin (FSG, 2009), and American Purgatorio (FSG, 2005). His stories and essays have appeared on the radio (The Next Big Thing, Studio 360), in books (The Show You'll Never Forget, Heavy Rotation, All the More Real), and in publications including A Public Space, n+1, The Baffler, Conjunctions, McSweeney's, and Vice.

Haskell has taught writing and literature at Columbia University, Cal Arts, and the Leipzig University. He is the recipient of a fellowship from the John Simon Guggenheim Foundation. Trying to Be received The Story Prize Spotlight Award for short story collections published in 2025.

== Works ==
=== Novels ===
- American Purgatorio: A Novel (Farrar, Straus and Giroux, 2005)
- Out of My Skin: A Novel (Farrar, Straus and Giroux, 2009)
- The Complete Ballet: A Fictional Essay in Five Acts (Graywolf Press, 2017)

=== Short-Story Collections ===
- I Am Not Jackson Pollock: Stories (Farrar, Straus and Giroux, 2003)
- Trying to Be: A Collection (University of Alabama Press, 2025)
