= New American Poetry Prize =

The New American Poetry Prize is an annual prize awarded by New American Press. The award was established in 2010 to give voice to emerging writers of innovative poetry. Judges rotate annually, and have included David Kirby, Jilian Weise, and Andrew Hudgins.

The New American Poetry Prize is awarded annually to one winner for a book-length work of poetry. Authors of winning manuscripts receive a cash award of US$1,000 and 25 contributor copies, and their collections are subsequently published under a standard contract.

== Winners ==
- 2014 Arne Weingart for "Levitation for Agnostics"
- 2013 Damien Shuck for The Drowning Room
- 2012 Renamed 2013 to reflect year of award announcement
- 2011 Paul Nemser for Taurus
- 2010 Stephen Haven for The Last Sacred Place in North America

== See also ==
- List of American literary awards
