= Patrick O'Keeffe (writer) =

Irish American novelist and short story writer

Patrick O’Keeffe (born 1963/1964) is an Irish American novelist and short story writer.

== Life ==
He was born and grew up in County Limerick, on a farm with his 9 brothers and sisters, but moved to the United States in his 20s to pursue writing. He graduated from the University of Kentucky, and from the University of Michigan with an MFA. He taught at the University of Michigan, University of Cincinnati, and Colgate University. He currently teaches in the graduate creative writing program at Ohio University.

== Awards ==
- 2006 Whiting Award
- 2005 Story Prize

== Works ==
- The Hill Road. Penguin. October 31, 2005. ISBN 978-0-14-303793-4.
- The Visitors. Viking. March 13, 2014. ISBN 978-0-67-002463-6.
