= Rebecca Skloot =

American science writer (born 1972)

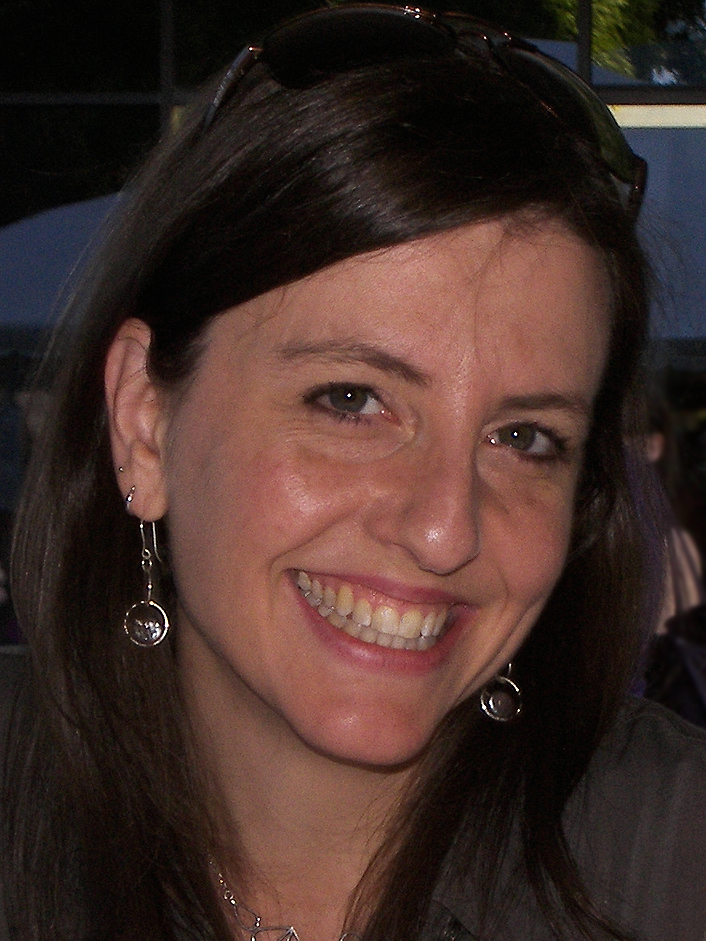
- Skloot at the 2010 Texas Book Festival
- Born: Rebecca Lee Skloot; September 19, 1972 (age 54); Springfield, Illinois, U.S.
- Education: Portland Community College; Colorado State University (BS); University of Pittsburgh (MFA)
- Occupation: Science writer
- Relatives: Floyd Skloot, father
- Writing career
- Notable work: The Immortal Life of Henrietta Lacks
- Website: www.rebeccaskloot.com

Rebecca Lee Skloot /ˈskluːt/ (born September 19, 1972) is an American science writer who specializes in science and medicine. Her first book, The Immortal Life of Henrietta Lacks (2010), was one of the best-selling new books of 2010, staying on The New York Times Bestseller list for over 6 years and eventually reaching #1. It was adapted into a movie by George C. Wolfe, which premiered on HBO on April 22, 2017, and starred Rose Byrne as Skloot, and Oprah Winfrey as Lacks's daughter Deborah.

== Early life and education ==
Rebecca was born in Springfield, Illinois. She is the daughter of poet, novelist, and essayist Floyd Skloot and Betsy McCarthy, a professional knitter and pattern book author. Skloot said, "in the Pacific Northwest, [her] roots [are] half New York Jew and half Midwestern Protestant." She received her high school diploma from Metropolitan Learning Center in Portland, Oregon. After attending Portland Community College and becoming a Veterinary Technician, she received a B.S. in biological sciences from Colorado State University, and an MFA in creative nonfiction from the University of Pittsburgh. She is a former vice president of the National Book Critics Circle.

== Career ==
She has taught creative writing and science journalism at the University of Pittsburgh, New York University, and the University of Memphis.

Skloot has published over 200 featured stories and essays. Her work has appeared in The New York Times, The New York Times Magazine, O: The Oprah Magazine, Discover, and New York magazine. Skloot is also a contributing editor at Popular Science and has worked as a correspondent for NPR's Radiolab and PBS's NOVA scienceNOW.

Her first book, the #1 New York Times bestselling The Immortal Life of Henrietta Lacks (2010), is about Henrietta Lacks and the immortal cell line (known as HeLa) that came from her cancer cells in 1951. It was named a New York Times notable book, and selected as the best book of the year by more than 60 publications. It was made into an HBO film produced by Oprah Winfrey and Alan Ball with Rose Byrne portraying Skloot.

In reviewing the book, Karen Long quotes Skloot and describes the long process to find a publisher: "The Lackses challenged everything I thought I knew about faith, science, journalism, and race," Skloot writes in her prologue. Stubbornly, she put a decade into telling this story, learning as much from the family as she was able to dig up herself. The book went through three publishing houses and four editors. Skloot and Henrietta's daughter Deborah formed a link in the writing of this book, which Deborah saw as her mother's hand guiding them.

Her second book, exploring the science and ethics of human–animal relationships, was put under contract with Crown Publishing Group in 2011. Her past work with animals in shelters, as a vet tech, in research facilities, and at an animal morgue prompted her interest in the ethical controversies surrounding animal use for science. She discussed the topics of the book at the Chicago Humanities Festival in 2013. She spoke with researchers at Harvard University about it in 2015.

== Awards and honors ==
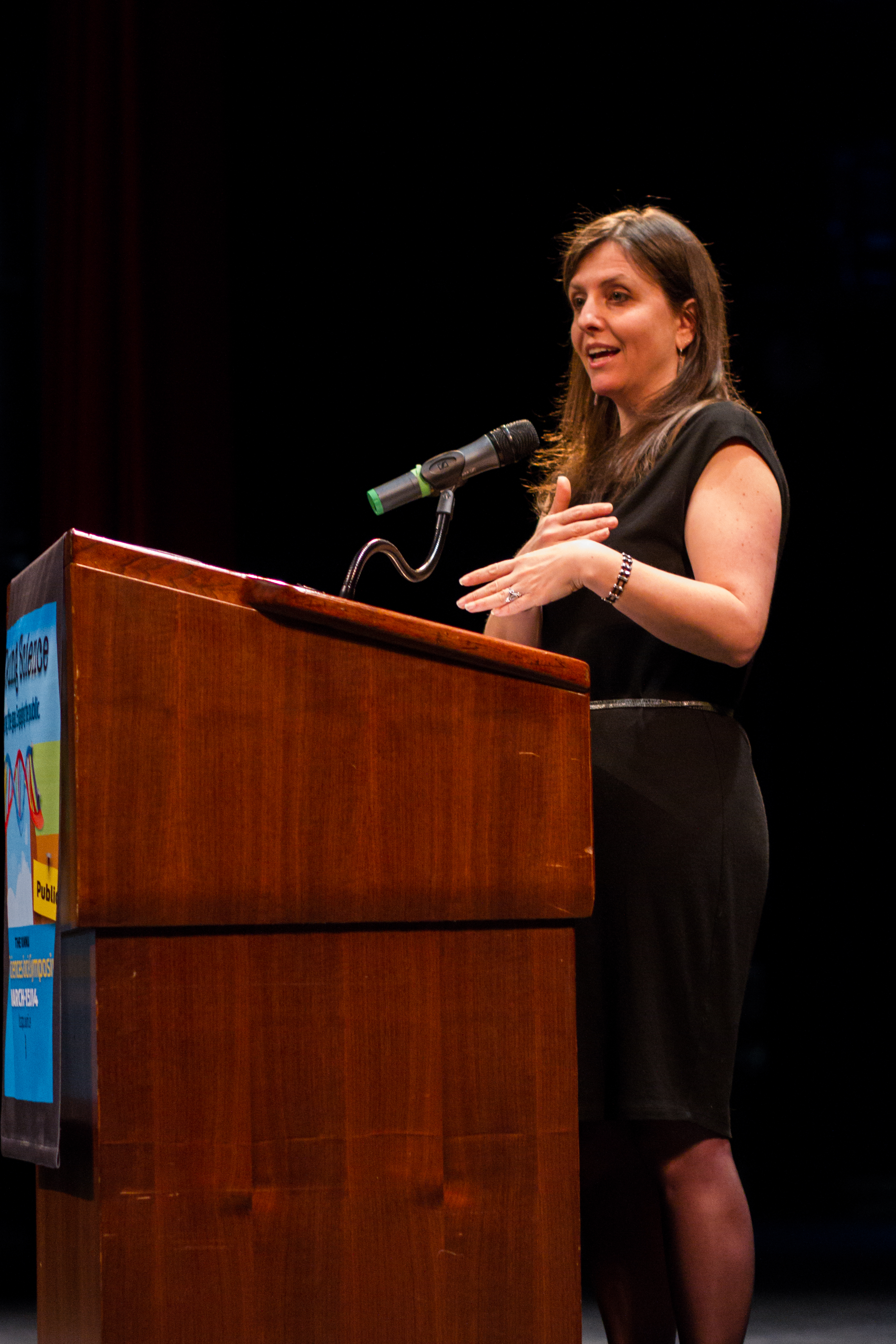
Rebecca Skloot talks at the University of Missouri in March 2014.

- 2005 Best American Food Writing, selection, "Two Americas, Two Restaurants, One Town"
- 2005 Best Personal Essay of the Year by the American Society of Journalists and Authors, winner, "When Pets Attack"
- 2005 The Best American Essays, selection, "Putting the Gene Back in Genealogy"
- 2005 The Best American Travel Writing, selection, "Two Americas, Two Restaurants, One Town"
- 2010 American Association for the Advancement of Science, Best Young Adult Book Award, The Immortal Life of Henrietta Lacks
- 2010 Wellcome Trust Book Prize, winner, The Immortal Life of Henrietta Lacks
- 2010 Chicago Tribune Heartland Prize, winner, The Immortal Life of Henrietta Lacks
- 2010 Medical Journalists' Association Open Book Awards, General Nonfiction, winner, The Immortal Life of Henrietta Lacks
- 2010 Chicago Tribune and Chicago Public Library 21st Century Award, winner
- 2010 Audie Award for Best Nonfiction Audiobook, The Immortal Life of Henrietta Lacks
- 2011 Ambassador Book Award, winner (Biography), The Immortal Life of Henrietta Lacks
- 2011 National Academies of Science Communication Awards, winner in Best Book category, The Immortal Life of Henrietta Lacks
- 2011 Audie Award for Best Nonfiction Audiobook, The Immortal Life of Henrietta Lacks

== Memberships ==
- American Society of Journalists and Authors
- National Association of Science Writers
- National Book Critics Circle

== Publications ==
Books

- The Immortal Life of Henrietta Lacks (Crown/Random House, 2010)
- The Best American Science Writing (Houghton Mifflin, 2011), co edited with Floyd Skloot

Select articles

- Henrietta's Dance. Johns Hopkins Magazine. April 2000.
- Some called her Miss Menten by Rebecca Skloot in Pittmed (University of Pittsburgh School of Medicine magazine), October 2000.
- An Obsession With Culture. Pitt Magazine. March 2001.
- Skloot, Rebecca (November 17, 2001). "Cells That Save Lives Are a Mother's Legacy". The New York Times.
- The Other Baby Experiment. The New York Times. February 22, 2003.
- Fixing Nemo. The New York Times. May 2, 2004.
- When Pets Attack. New York magazine. October 11, 2004.
- Taking the Least of You. The New York Times Magazine. April 16, 2006.
- Creature Comforts. The New York Times Magazine. December 31, 2008.
- Excerpt from "The Immortal Life of Henrietta Lacks", Oprah Magazine, February 2010
- The Immortal Life of Henrietta Lacks, The Sequel The New York Times March 23, 2013
- Your Cells. Their Research. Your Permission? The New York Times Dec 30, 2015
