= The Best American Series =

Book anthologies

The Best American Series is a series of anthologies that is published annually by Mariner Books, an imprint of HarperCollins. Each title within the series covers a specific genre such as short stories or mysteries. The works for each year's edition are selected from those published elsewhere during the previous year.

The Best American Short Stories has been published since 1915, making it the oldest continuous series of its type. Starting in 1986, additional titles were added for essays, sports writing, nature writing and more, at which time the broader The Best American Series moniker was introduced.

The series was published by Houghton Mifflin Harcourt prior to HarperCollins acquiring HMH Books & Media in 2021.

== Editing ==
Each title has a continuing series editor who makes an initial selection of notable works from which a guest editor chooses those for inclusion in that year's edition. Guest editors are established authors in the title's associated genre. A new guest editor is chosen each year.

A work is eligible for the series if it is published in English (or published in another language but translated into English by the author) in the United States, Canada, Mexico, or Greenland; if it first appeared, or was significantly revised, during the previous year; and if the author comes from or chiefly lives in North America. Internet publications are eligible if their audience includes North American readers. Works that do not make the final cut are often given honorable mention in an alphabetical list at the back of the book.

Many editions have a mix of works from well-established authors—examples include Joyce Carol Oates, Michael Chabon, and Lorrie Moore—along with up-and-coming writers who have achieved moderate success, such as Benjamin Percy, Kyle Minor, and Ander Monson. Introductions to each edition are written by the series editor, guest editor, and sometimes other celebrities, such as actor Viggo Mortensen for The Best American Nonrequired Reading and UK cook Jamie Oliver for The Best American Recipes.

The editions are published in September or October and feature works that were published during the prior year: for example, The Best American Essays 2000 contains works published in 1999.

== Titles ==
The Best American Series includes the following titles:

- The Best American Short Stories (1915–)
- The Best American Essays (1986–)
- The Best American Mystery and Suspense (1997–)
- The Best American Science and Nature Writing (2000–)
- The Best American Science Fiction and Fantasy (2015–)
- The Best American Food and Travel Writing (2024–)

The following titles were formerly included in the series:

- The Best American Recipes (1999–2005)
- The Best American Spiritual Writing (2004–2008)
- The Best American Infographics (2013–2016)
- The Best American Nonrequired Reading (2002–2019)
- The Best American Comics (2006–2019)
- The Best American Sports Writing (1991–2020)
- The Best American Travel Writing (2000–2021)
- The Best American Food Writing (2018–2023)
