= Alden Jones =

American writer (born 1972)

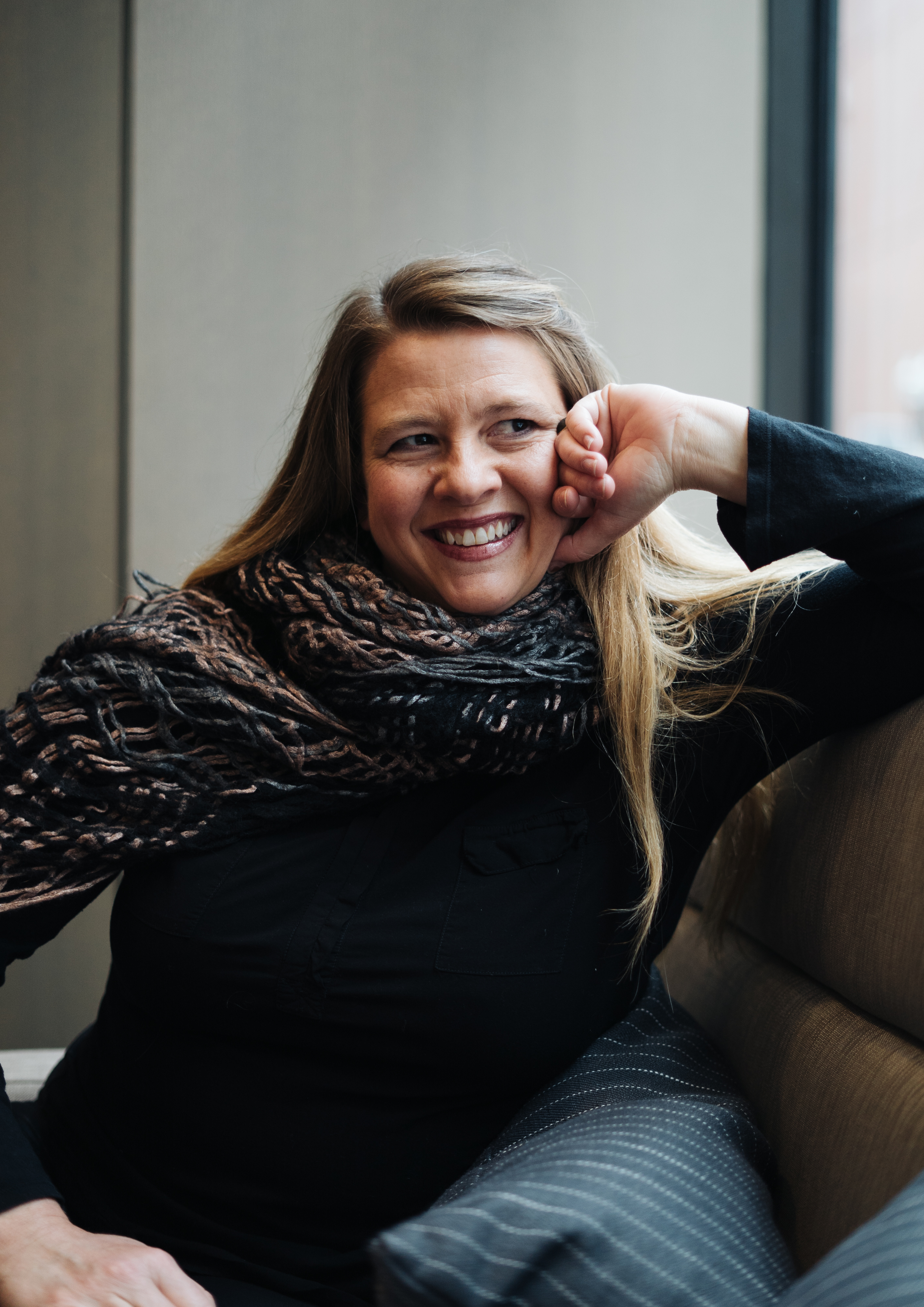
- Jones in 2019
- Born: New York City
- Citizenship: United States
- Occupation: Writer
- Writing career
- Genres: Fiction, memoir
- Notable works: The Blind Masseuse (2013); Unaccompanied Minors (2014); The Wanting Was a Wilderness (2020)
- Notable awards: Independent Publisher Book Awards for Travel Essay; New American Fiction Prize (2013)
- Website: aldenjones.com

Alden Jones (born 1972) is an American writer and educator. She is the author of memoirs The Wanting Was a Wilderness (2020) and The Blind Masseuse (2013) and the short story collection Unaccompanied Minors (2014). The Blind Masseuse was longlisted for the PEN/Diamonstein-Spielvogal Award for the Art of the Essay.

== Life ==
Jones was born in New York City and raised in Montclair, New Jersey. Her mother is a publicist and her father is renowned golf course architect Rees Jones. She graduated from Brown University, where she studied fiction under Edmund White, and received master's degrees from Bennington College and New York University, where she was a University Fellow in fiction. Jones has traveled extensively as an educator, including as a visiting professor on Semester at Sea, as the director of several programs in Cuba and as a Cuban Culture Expert on Royal Caribbean Cruises, and for a year in Costa Rica as a volunteer elementary school English teacher for WorldTeach, which was the subject of her first published essay, "Lard is Good For You".

== Career ==
Jones's travel essay, "Lard is Good For You," appeared in the inaugural edition of Best American Travel Writing, edited by Bill Bryson. This essay became the first chapter in The Blind Masseuse: A Traveler's Memoir from Costa Rica to Cambodia (University of Wisconsin Press, 2013), a travelogue about Jones's travels in Costa Rica, Bolivia, Nicaragua, Cuba, Vietnam, Cambodia, Burma, India, and Egypt. The Blind Masseuse explores exoticism and the ethics of traveling as an American abroad and was named Recommended Reading by PEN America and National Geographic and a Top Ten Travel Title of 2013 by Publishers Weekly.

Unaccompanied Minors (New American Press, 2014), a collection of stories with adolescent protagonists, won the New American Fiction Prize and was named by the Star-Ledger's Jacqueline Cutler as one of the "Ten Best Books of 2014 by New Jersey Authors."

Jones' third book, the critical memoir The Wanting Was a Wilderness: Cheryl Strayed’s Wild and the Art of Memoir (Fiction Advocate, 2020), is a hybrid nonfiction work that the Center for Fiction described as "an intertextual blend of criticism and personal memoir that highlights the importance of contemporary literary analysis."

Her short stories, essays, and criticism have appeared in New York Magazine, BOMB, The Boston Globe, AGNI, Prairie Schooner, Post Road, the Iowa Review, The Rumpus, and WBUR's Cognoscenti. She is also the editor of Edge of the World, an anthology of travel essays by LGBTQ+ writers including Alexander Chee, Daisy Hernández, and Garrard Conley.

Jones is assistant professor at Emerson College in the department of Writing, Literature and Publishing. Emerson College awarded her the Alan Stanzler Award for Excellence in Teaching in 2016. She is also on the faculty of the low-residency Newport MFA program at Salve Regina University.

She was named a Fulbright Specialist in 2024.

== Awards ==
- Foreword Indie Award in Travel Essays for The Blind Masseuse
- PEN/Diamonstein-Spielvogel Award for the Art of the Essay longlist for The Blind Masseuse
- New American Fiction Prize for Unaccompanied Minors
- Independent Publisher Book Awards in Short Fiction for Unaccompanied Minors
- Lambda Literary Award for LGBT Debut Fiction finalist for Unaccompanied Minors
- Edmund White Award finalist for Unaccompanied Minors
- Lascaux Book Prize for Unaccompanied Minors
- Lambda Literary Award for Bisexual Nonfiction finalist for The Wanting Was a Wilderness
- Marion and Jasper Whiting Foundation Fellowship

== Bibliography ==
- The Blind Masseuse: A Traveler's Memoir from Costa Rica to Cambodia (2013)
- Unaccompanied Minors (2014)
- The Wanting Was a Wilderness: Cheryl Strayed’s Wild and the Art of Memoir (2020)
- Edge of the World: An Anthology of Queer Travel Writing (2025)
