= This Is Where the Serpent Lives =

2026 novel by Daniyal Mueenuddin

This Is Where the Serpent Lives is a Pakistani coming-of-age novel by Daniyal Mueenuddin. The narrative centres on Yazid, a chauffeur, who begins life as an illiterate orphan and gradually acquires literacy and social mobility. As he matures, his ambition, intelligence and sociability enable him to build relationships across social classes, including within elite circles. The novel explores themes of class hierarchy, social mobility, and the relationships between a wealthy family and those in their service. It was published by Alfred A. Knopf on 13 January 2026.

The novel's title is taken from Wallace Stevens's poem, "The Auroras of Autumn."
