= Sheila Schwartz =

American novelist

- Sheila Schwartz, 1991 (photo courtesy Dan Chaon)
- Born: Sheila Miriam Schwartz; May 4, 1952; Philadelphia, Pennsylvania, U.S.
- Died: November 8, 2008 (aged 56)
- Education: Temple University; Binghamton University
- Occupations: Writer (fiction); Academic
- Spouse: Dan Chaon (m. 1988)
- Writing career
- Notable works: Imagine a Great White Light, "Afterbirth"
- Notable awards: O. Henry Award; Pushcart Award

Sheila Schwartz (May 4, 1952 – November 8, 2008) was an American writer and creative writing professor. Her short story collection Imagine a Great White Light won a Pushcart Press Editor's Award and was named one of the best books of 1991 by USA Today, and her short story "Afterbirth" won a 1999 O. Henry Award.

== Early life and education ==
Sheila Miriam Schwartz was born on May 4, 1952, as a daughter of Philip and Ruth (Motiloff) Schwartz, and was originally from Philadelphia. She had at least one sibling, a sister who died of breast cancer in 1996.

She earned a bachelor's degree in English from Temple University in 1974 and a master's degree in creative writing from Binghamton University, where she studied with John Gardner, in 1981. She was awarded a two-year Wallace Stegner Fellowship at Stanford University, from 1981 to 1983, for writing fiction.

== Career ==
=== Writing ===
She wrote the short story collection Imagine a Great White Light, the posthumously published novel Lies Will Take You Somewhere, and other published stories and essays.

Imagine a Great White Light was published in 1991 by Pushcart Press, as the winner of its annual Editor's Award for "overlooked manuscripts of enduring literary value." It was a collection of short stories, some of which had previously been published in The Atlantic and several literary journals. Kirkus Reviews described it as "nine stories, mostly about families: a good dose of Ann Beattie minimalism with a Jewish slant and with some witty Lorrie Moore urban angst thrown in for good measure," evaluating it as "a graceful debut with a quirky voice and a couple of offbeat perspectives." The Publishers Weekly review concluded: "by turns dreamy and hard-edged, these stories are disturbing and, occasionally, profound." USA Today named it one of the best books of 1991.

Lies Will Take You Somewhere was published by Etruscan Press in 2009, three months after Schwartz's death. She had spent about fifteen years writing it, submitting it to publishers, and repeatedly revising it—her 1998 capsule bio described it as "recently completed"—until she completed the final draft in about June 2008. It is described in an apparent publisher's summary, repeated by several booksellers, as a "Jewish/Gothic" novel, reminiscent of Cynthia Ozick, that tells the story of Jane Rozen, who "leaves her three daughters and husband Saul, a rabbi, to care for her mother in Florida." A review in Publishers Weekly called it a "strong debut novel," in which "Schwartz takes a hard look at the dark secrets hiding within a marriage." A Plain Dealer review concluded that it "makes wise observations about families and the gaps between what outsiders see and what the players themselves experience."

She wrote a number of other stories including "Afterbirth," which was published in Ploughshares in 1998 and won a 1999 O. Henry Award as one of the twenty best short stories of the previous year.

In 2000, when she was first diagnosed with cancer, Schwartz began writing an interlinked set of short stories called In the Infusion Room, linked by the common setting of the "infusion room" for chemotherapy treatment. She completed the collection shortly before her death, and her husband sought to find a publisher for it. He described its objective as "to reclaim the 'cancer story' from the realm of Lifetime Channel TV—that bland, easy sentiment" and its crucial idea as, "while our minds are still running, things are never really over. . . . Even as it becomes more and more difficult, we are still ourselves in all our grubby, lovely glory—all the way till the last second. . . . You are you! Urgently! And then you stop." A story from that collection, "Finding Peace," was published in 2009 by One Story.

Her essay about cancer, "Three Cancer Patients Walk into a Bar," was published in 2009 by The Rumpus.

That her books were published by small presses limited the size of her audience. Her husband wrote, "One of the things that I never could figure out was why Sheila didn't become a well-known writer. She was, herself, very modest and circumspect and philosophical about it, the world of writing was random, she said, but I was disappointed. Discouraged. She was so good, I thought, so brilliant sentence by sentence, paragraph by paragraph. . . . Her fiction walks this incredible thin line between hilarity and despair, between the absurd and the tragic, between detachment and compassion. She maneuvers with a dizzying, frightening grace—the way that Philippe Petit walked the high wire between the twin towers of the World Trade Center."

=== Teaching ===
Schwartz taught creative writing at Northwestern University, Ohio University, Syracuse University, and Cleveland State University, where she joined the faculty in 1990 and remained for the rest of her teaching career. One of her students, journalist Lee Chilcote, described her as a "hugely generous teacher and critic."

== Illness and death ==
Schwartz died on November 8, 2008, at age 56, of complications from ovarian cancer. She was first diagnosed with stage-four ovarian cancer in 2000, and she fought an eight-year battle with cancer that included surgery, three rounds of chemotherapy, and two remissions, with the cancer returning a second time in 2006. She worked until the last week of her life.

== Personal life ==
In 1988 Schwartz married writer Dan Chaon; they were married for twenty years until her death. The two met when he was a nineteen-year-old undergraduate student at Northwestern, and she was his thirty-year-old writing professor. At the time of their wedding her mother was "not thrilled" that Schwartz, who was Jewish, married a Gentile. For the first years of their relationship, she was the literary "star" of the family, with prestigious publications and awards, but starting in 2001 his star "eclipsed" hers. Chaon described Schwartz as his best critic. They had two sons, Philip and Paul.

Their family lived in Cleveland Heights, Ohio, and the couple was described as "the much-loved center of literary Cleveland."

== Awards and recognition ==
- 1981–83 - Wallace Stegner Fellowship, Stanford University
- 1991 - Pushcart Editor's Award, for Imagine a Great White Light
- 1993 - National Education Association Individual Artists Fellow
- 1993 - National Endowment for the Arts grant
- 1999 - O. Henry Award, for "Afterbirth"
- 2005 - Ohio Arts Council grant
