= Miriam N. Kotzin =

American poet

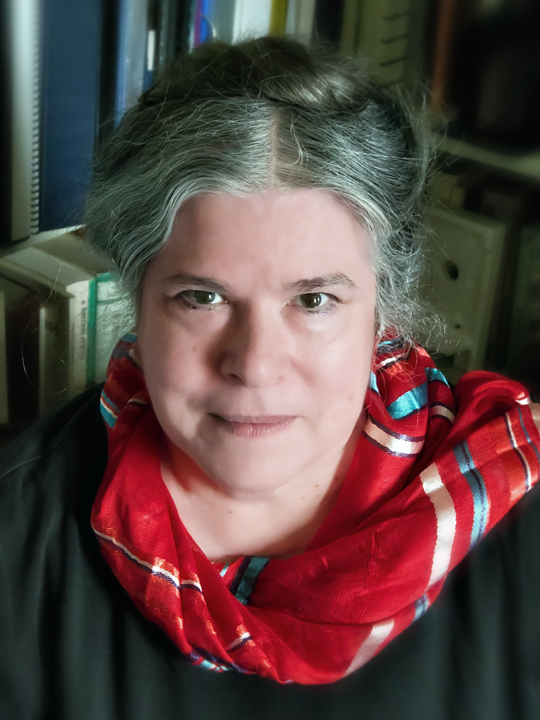
- Kotzin in June 2012
- Education: University of Pennsylvania (BA); New York University (PhD)
- Occupations: Professor, poet, short story writer, editor

Miriam N. Kotzin is Professor of English at Drexel University, a poet and short-story writer, founding editor of Per Contra, a literary journal, and a contributing editor at Boulevard Magazine edited by Richard Burgin. Kotzin has published over 120 poems and has been nominated three times for a Pushcart Prize. She is also the author of over 50 short stories. She has published several volumes: three collections of poetry, Reclaiming the Dead (2009), Weights and Measures (2010), and Taking Stock (2011); and Just Desserts (2010), a collection of short stories.

Kotzin received her B.A. from the University of Pennsylvania (Phi Beta Kappa) and her Ph.D from New York University. At Drexel University she previously directed Drexel University’s Certificate Program in Writing and Publishing and is also former director of the Literature program. She has been a juror for the American Film Festival (1973–1982) and judged literary competitions for the Philadelphia Writers' Conference.
