= Kyle Minor =

American writer (born 1976)

Kyle Minor (born 1976) is an American writer. Born and raised in West Palm Beach, Florida, Minor lived in Ohio and Kentucky before settling in Indiana. He studied writing at Ohio State University, where he was a three-time honoree in The Atlantic Monthly Student Writing Awards and a winner of the 2012 Iowa Review Prize for Short Fiction and Random House's Twentysomething Essays by Twentysomething Writers contest, and at the Iowa Writers' Workshop, where he reported on the 2012 United States presidential election for Esquire.

His debut collection of short fiction, In the Devil's Territory, which was described as being about how "personal secrets always exact a terrible price" in a review at the Boston Phoenix, included the novella A Day Meant to Do Less, which was chosen by George Pelecanos for Houghton Mifflin's Best American Mystery Stories 2008 anthology. His stories and essays also appear in literary journals including Esquire, Southern Review, Gettysburg Review, and Gulf Coast, and in 2013/14 he wrote a biweekly column for Salon.com. His second collection of short fiction, Praying Drunk, was called an "often dazzling, emotional, funny, captivating puzzle" by Publishers Weekly. In January 2015, it was awarded The Story Prize Spotlight Award, which honors a short story collection worthy of additional attention.

Minor has written about driving for Uber following a film deal that fell through.

A collection of essays, How to Disappear and Why, was published in February 2026 by Sarabande Books and received a starred review from Kirkus Reviews.

== Bibliography ==
- How to Disappear and Why (essays, Sarabande Books, 2026)
- Praying Drunk (short fiction, Sarabande Books, 2014)
- In the Devil's Territory (short fiction, Dzanc Books, 2008)
