= American Name Society =

American non-profit organization specializing in onomastics

- Abbreviation: ANS
- Formation: December 29, 1951
- Founded at: Detroit, Michigan
- Type: Scholarly society
- Purpose: Onomastics
- Website: https://www.americannamesociety.org/

The American Name Society (ANS) is a non-profit organization founded in 1951 to promote onomastics, the study of names and naming practices, both in the United States and abroad. The organization investigates cultural insights, settlement history, and linguistic characteristics revealed in names.

The ANS runs an annual conference for name scholars and enthusiasts, and it is the largest scholarly society dedicated to "the investigation of names and how they develop". Since 1952, the ANS has produced the journal Names. Since its very first issue in 1952, this scientific quarterly has continually published original articles, notes, and book reviews that investigate the derivation, function, and impact of names and naming in North America and around the world. The American Dialect Society was the parent organization of ANS. It has also been associated with the Modern Language Association.

== History ==
In the early 1950s, members of the American Dialect Society felt that there ought to be another organization focused on the function of proper nouns. On December 29, 1951, in Detroit, a group of academics voted to create the American Name Society, which would focus on onomastics and publish a quarterly journal with content written by society members. The founders appointed a Sponsoring Committee with 29 members and elected a president, Elsdon C. Smith. The first meeting was held on December 27, 1952, in Boston. The ANS has had a broad scope since its inception, and attracts specialists from a variety of fields.

== Names: A Journal of Onomastics ==
In March 1953, the ANS began publishing Names: A Journal of Onomastics. The first volume of Names was published in March 1953, edited by Erwin Gudde. George R. Stewart, a founding member of the ANS, described his vision for using Names to define the field of onomastics. As of January 2021, all current and archived issues of Names became available for free via the Open Access program at the University of Pittsburgh. In 2022, Names was awarded the exclusive DOAJ Seal from the Directory of Open Access Journals, reflecting best practices in open access publishing. Professor I.M. Nick is the current Editor-in-Chief of Names.

== Awards ==
=== Emerging Scholar Award ===
The Emerging Scholar Award recognizes names researchers in the early stages of their academic or professional careers. The awardee receives recognition at the annual meeting, a cash prize of $250, one year of membership in the ANS.

=== Best Article in Names: A Journal of Onomastics ===
The Best Article in Names: A Journal of Onomastics is given to the one article per year that the journal editorial board selects as demonstrating the highest level of methodological innovation, exhibiting exemplary style and organization; and promising to make the most significant contribution to the scholarly investigation of names and naming.

== Name of the Year ==
Since 2004, the ANS has declared a Name of the Year. Each year, the public can nominate a name by contacting the Name of the Year election coordinator with justification for the name's inclusion. ANS members can also nominate names at the annual meeting. Nominated names are judged on three criteria: linguistic innovation, potential to impact language use, and ability to capture national attention. Since 2008, the ANS has voted on the top personal name, place name, trade name, and fictional name at its annual conference.

Year	Name of the Year (Overall)	Artistic & Literary	Personal	Place	Trade	Miscellaneous	E-Name	Notes
2025	No Kings	Eleven (Stranger Things)	Zohran Mamdani	Gulf of America	Labubu	No Kings	Claude	
2024	Ozempic	James	Kamala	Ohio	Ozempic	Brat	Wrapped	Press Release
2023	Gaza & Barbie (tie)	Barbenheimer	Swiftie	Gaza	ChatGPT		X	
2022	Ukraine	Encanto	Volodymyr Zelenskyy	Kyiv	FTX	January 6	NFT	
2021	Great Resignation	Squid Game	Karen	United States Capitol	Cyber Ninjas	CRT	#FreeBritney	
2020	Kamala & COVID-19 (tie)	Schitt's Creek	George Floyd	Wuhan, China	Zoom	COVID-19	QAnon	
2019	Arrokoth	Baby Yoda	Greta Thunberg	Arrokoth	TikTok	Antivaxxer	#Fridaysforfuture	
2018	Jamal Khashoggi	Wakanda	Jamal Khashoggi	Paradise, California	Gritty			
2017	Rohingya	Nambia	Maria	Charlottesville	Me Too			Donald Trump referred to the nation "Nambia" in a September 2017 speech at the United Nations.
2016	Aleppo	Hamilton		Aleppo	Brexit			
2015	Caitlyn Jenner	Rey, Finn, and Poe (Star Wars: The Force Awakens)	Caitlyn Jenner	Denali	Charlie Hebdo			
2014	Ferguson	Elsa (Disney)	Malala	Ferguson	Uber			
2013	Francis	Ender Wiggin	Francis	Syria	ObamaCare			
2012	Sandy	Downton Abbey	Malala	Gangnam	Fiscal cliff			
2011	Arab Spring	Lisbeth Salander	Muammar Gaddafi	Fukushima, Fukushima	Siri			
2010	Eyjafjallajökull	Quinn and Finn (Glee)	Lady Gaga	Eyjafjallajökull	Tea Party			
2009	Salish Sea	Max (Where the Wild Things Are (film))	Chesley Sullenberger	Salish Sea	Twitter			
2008	Barack Hussein Obama	Edward (Twilight (novel series))	Barack Hussein Obama	Wasilla, Alaska	Fannie Mae and Freddie Mac			
2007	Betrayus							Nickname for Sen. Chuck Hagel and later Gen. David Petraeus.
2006	Pluto							
2005	Katrina							
2004	Fahrenheit 9/11							

== Related organizations ==
The American Name Society is allied with the Modern Language Association (MLA).

=== Sister Societies ===
The American Name Society is a member of a group of sister societies that meet concurrently with the Linguistic Society of America:

- American Dialect Society (ADS)
- North American Association for the History of Language Sciences (NAAHoLS)
- Society for Pidgin and Creole Linguistics (SPCL)
- Society for the Study of the Indigenous Languages of the Americas (SSILA)
- The Association for Linguistic Evidence (TALE)
- The North American Research Network in Historical Sociolinguistics (NARNiHS)
