= PEN/E. O. Wilson Literary Science Writing Award =

The PEN/E.O. Wilson Literary Science Writing Award is awarded by the PEN America (formerly PEN American Center) for writing that exemplifies literary excellence on the subject of physical and biological sciences. The award includes a cash prize of $10,000.

The award was founded by scientist and author Dr. Edward O. Wilson, activist and actor Harrison Ford, and the E. O. Wilson Biodiversity Foundation. The award was inaugurated in 2011.

Examples of published works that exemplify the quality of writing the award is designed to acknowledge include Rachel Carson's Silent Spring (1962) and James Watson's The Double Helix (1969), which contribute 'to the public’s understanding of scientific principles at work in the world today.'

The award is one of many PEN awards sponsored by International PEN affiliates in over 145 PEN centers around the world. The PEN American Center awards have been characterized as being among the "major" American literary prizes.

== Award winners ==
PEN/E. O. Wilson Literary Science Writing Award winners and runners-up
Year	Author	Title	Result	Ref.
2011	Siddhartha Mukherjee	The Emperor of All Maladies: A Biography of Cancer	Winner	
2011	David Abram	Becoming Animal	Runner-up	
2012	James Gleick	The Information: A History, a Theory, a Flood	Winner	
2012	Donovan Hohn	Moby-Duck: The True Story of 28,800 Bath Toys Lost at Sea and of the Beachcombers, Oceanographers, Environmentalists, and Fools, Including the Author, Who Went in Search of Them	Runner-up	
2013	Leonard Mlodinow	Subliminal: How Your Unconscious Mind Rules Your Behavior	Winner	
2013	David G. Haskell	The Forest Unseen	Runner-up	
2014	Carl Hart	High Price: A Neuroscientist’s Journey of Self-Discovery That Challenges Everything You Know About Drugs and Society	Winner	
2015	Joshua Horwitz	War of the Whales: A True Story	Winner	
2016	Lauren Redniss	Thunder & Lightning: Weather Past, Present, Future	Winner	
2016	Cynthia Barnett	Rain: A Natural and Cultural History	Shortlist	
2016	Joel K. Bourne Jr.	The End of Plenty: The Race to Feed a Crowded World	Shortlist	
2016	Tom Clynes	The Boy Who Played with Fusion: Extreme Science, Extreme Parenting, and How to Make a Star	Shortlist	
2016	Alexandra Witze and Jeff Kanipe	Island on Fire: The Extraordinary Story of a Forgotten Volcano That Changed the World	Shortlist	
2017	Luke Dittrich	Patient H.M.: A Story of Memory, Madness, and Family Secrets	Winner	
2017	Dan Flores	Coyote America: A Natural and Supernatural History	Shortlist	
2017	Julian Guthrie	How to Make a Spaceship: A Band of Renegades, an Epic Race, and the Birth of a Private Spaceflight	Shortlist	
2017	Hope Jahren	Lab Girl	Shortlist	
2017	Emily Voigt	The Dragon Behind the Glass: A True Story of Power, Obsession, and the World’s Most Coveted Fish	Shortlist	
2018	Lindsey Fitzharris	The Butchering Art: Joseph Lister's Quest to Transform the Grisly World of Victorian Medicine	Winner	
2018	David Baron	American Eclipse: A Nation’s Epic Race to Catch the Shadow of the Moon and Win the Glory of the World	Shortlist	
2018	David Montgomery	Growing a Revolution: Bringing Our Soil Back to Life	Shortlist	
2018	Ron Powers	No One Cares About Crazy People: The Chaos and Heartbreak of Mental Health in America	Shortlist	
2018	Robert Sapolsky	Behave: The Biology of Humans at Our Best and Worst	Shortlist	
2019	Ben Goldfarb	Eager: The Surprising, Secret Life of Beavers and Why They Matter	Winner	
2019	Vince Beiser	The World in a Grain	Shortlist	
2019	Andrea Buchanan	The Beginning of Everything	Shortlist	
2019	Lauren Slater	Blue Dreams: The Science and the Story of the Drugs that Changed Our Minds	Shortlist	
2019	Carl Zimmer	She Has Her Mother’s Laugh	Shortlist	
2020	Frans de Waal	Mama's Last Hug: Animal Emotions and What They Tell Us about Ourselves	Winner	
2020	Patricia S. Churchland	Conscience: The Origins of Moral Intuition	Shortlist	
2020	Elizabeth Hennessy	On the Backs of Tortoises: Darwin, the Galapagos, and the Fate of an Evolutionary Eden	Shortlist	
2020	Dahr Jamail	The End of Ice: Bearing Witness and Finding Meaning in the Path of Climate Disruption	Shortlist	
2020	Nathaniel Rich	Losing Earth: A Recent History	Shortlist	
2021	Jonathan Slaght	Owls of the Eastern Ice: A Quest to Find and Save the World's Largest Owl	Winner	
2021	Jennifer Ackerman	The Bird Way: A New Look at How Birds Talk, Work, Play, Parent, and Think	Shortlist	
2021	Rebecca Giggs	Fathoms: The World in the Whale	Shortlist	
2021	Emily Levesque	The Last Stargazers: The Enduring Story of Astronomy’s Vanishing Explorers	Shortlist	
2021	Sonia Shah	The Next Great Migration: The Beauty and Terror of Life on the Move	Shortlist	
2022	Catherine Raven	Fox & I: An Uncommon Friendship	Winner	
2022	Lauren Aguirre	The Memory Thief: And the Secrets Behind What We Remember — A Medical Mystery	Shortlist	
2022	Chanda Prescod-Weinstein	The Disordered Cosmos: A Journey into Dark Matter, Spacetime, and Dreams Deferred	Shortlist	
2022	Lisa Wells	Believers: Making a Life at the End of the World	Shortlist	
2022	Carl Zimmer	Life’s Edge: The Search for What It Means to Be Alive	Shortlist	
2023	Florence Williams	Heartbreak: A Personal and Scientific Journey	Winner	
2023	Rachel E. Gross	Vagina Obscura: An Anatomical Voyage	Shortlist	
2023	David George Haskell	Sounds Wild and Broken: Sonic Marvels, Evolution's Creativity, and the Crisis of Sensory Extinction	Shortlist	
2023	Manil Suri	The Big Bang of Numbers: How to Build the Universe Using Only Math	Shortlist	
2024	Rosanna Xia	California Against the Sea: Visions for Our Vanishing Coastline	Winner	
2024	Brad Fox	The Bathysphere Book: Effects of the Luminous Ocean Depths	Shortlist	
2024	Ben Goldfarb	Crossings: How Road Ecology Is Shaping the Future of Our Planet	Shortlist	
2024	Leah Hazard	Womb: The Inside Story of How It All Began	Shortlist	
2024	Charles Barber	In the Blood: How Two Outsiders Solved a Centuries-Old Medical Mystery and Took on the US Army	Shortlist	
2025	Jason Roberts	Every Living Thing: The Great and Deadly Race to Know All Life	Winner	
2025	Sunil Amrith	The Burning Earth: A History	Shortlist	
2025	Kelly Clancy	Playing with Reality: How Games Have Shaped Our World	Shortlist	
2025	Elizabeth Comen	All in Her Head: The Truth and Lies Early Medicine Taught Us About Women’s Bodies and Why It Matters Today	Shortlist	
2025	Erika Howsare	The Age of Deer: Trouble and Kinship with Our Wild Neighbors	Shortlist	
