= Raw Story =

American progressive news website

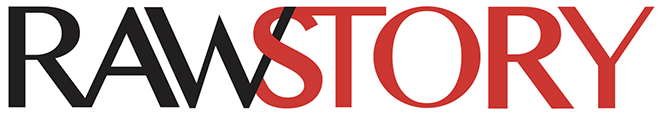
- Logo

- Homepage in September 2023
- Website type: Online newspaper
- Available in: English
- Founded: 2004; 22 years ago
- Owners: Raw Story Media, Inc.
- Key people: John K. Byrne (founder, chairman, CEO); Michael Rogers (vice chairman); Roxanne Cooper (editor and publisher); Adam Nichols (editor-in-chief); Brad Reed (managing editor)
- Website: www.rawstory.com
- Commercial: Yes

Raw Story (also stylized as RawStory) is an American progressive news website. Its reporting is a combination of syndicated articles, aggregated material, and its own independent reporting. With its focus on "news that's downplayed by mainstream media outlets", Raw Story often scoops major news media and has received several awards for its investigative journalism on topics such as domestic extremism, congressional conflicts-of-interest, and violence against US postal carriers. The organization was founded in 2004 by John K. Byrne and is owned by Byrne and Michael Rogers.

== History ==
Byrne started Raw Story as a counterpoint to the right-leaning Drudge Report after he graduated from Oberlin College in 2003. It was officially launched in 2004, with Rogers joining the same year.

In 2017, Raw Story was accepted as a member of the Association of Alternative News Media.

In April 2018, Raw Story partners John K. Byrne and Michael Rogers announced that they had acquired AlterNet via a newly created company, AlterNet Media, as well as the New Civil Rights Movement.

From 2019 to 2021, Raw Story partnered with Pulitzer Prize winner investigative journalist David Cay Johnston and his nonprofit news service DCReport, providing funding for DCReport's investigative reporting in exchange for original content for Raw Story's subscribers on financial regulation, taxes, energy, the environment, worker safety, and corruption.

In 2023, Raw Story hired Dave Levinthal as Editor-in-Chief and Adam Nichols as Executive Editor with the goal of expanding investigative and enterprise reporting. Levinthal was deputy editor at Insider, and previously served at OpenSecrets, Politico and The Dallas Morning News. Adam Nichols was formerly Managing Editor at Patch.

== Coverage ==
Founder John Byrne described Raw Story as "focusing on news that's downplayed by mainstream media outlets". In its early days, Raw Story was known for scooping larger media outlets on their own stories and breaking them before publication. During the presidential administration of George W. Bush, Raw Story identified a secret CIA black site in Poland that was used for renditions.

In 2014, then-executive editor Tony Ortega described Raw Story's editorial mission as trying to expose people "who try to exploit American ideas about fair play and equality by rigging things through their immense wealth or their discriminatory cultural myopia." In 2005, Newsweek described rawstory.com as: "Muck, raked: If you're looking for alleged GOP malfeasance, the folks at rawstory.com are frequently scooping the mainstream media."

In November 2008, Raw Story reported that the United Mine Workers of America, which had endorsed Barack Obama's presidential campaign, had come to Obama's defense after John McCain's presidential campaign criticized him for a comment he had made about coal to the editorial board of the San Francisco Chronicle earlier that January. Environmental journalist Andrew Revkin cited the article by Raw Story in a post he wrote for The New York Times' Dot Earth blog, and Curtis Brainard, writing in the Columbia Journalism Review, described the article as "well-done".

In 2011, Raw Story was among the first outlets to report on the Apple assistant Siri apparently directing users away from abortion clinics and emergency contraception, instead providing results for the definition of emergency contraception or clinics far from the user. The assistant, still in beta testing at the time, could, however, provide users with methods to acquire Viagra or use escort services. The same year, Raw Story was the first to report on a United States Air Force contract to create fake social media profiles as a means of psychological warfare to be used against terrorist cells.

In 2012, then-executive editor Megan Carpentier wrote about undergoing a transvaginal ultrasound procedure in response to recent legislation in Virginia requiring an ultrasound prior to an abortion procedure.

In 2014, Jennifer Mascia published a column on gun violence after compiling records for The New York Times.

In 2017, Raw Story investigative reporter Jordan Green reported from the ground of the Unite the Right rally, and in 2021 covered the civil trial which resulted in a $25 million judgment against the organizers of the rally. Green had been following the activities of extremist groups, learning their lingo, and communicating with them. He had learned that such groups precisely and strategically plan their violent clashes. "That revelation informs his new work — tracking where January 6th insurrectionists’ anger is now directed and how it may manifest again."

In 2018, Raw Story and Newsweek both published a report claiming that Russian trolls co-opting the Me Too movement had forced Minnesota senator Al Franken to resign, and that an article by writer Ijeoma Oluo had been used as part of the campaign. Snopes suggested the articles were "cribbed from a blog post on Medium.com". Raw Story and Newsweek later retracted their reports.

During the 2020 United States presidential election, Raw Story published an article on November 4, 2020, which claimed that the United States Postal Service (USPS) had failed to deliver 27 percent of mail-in ballots in South Florida. PolitiFact determined that the figure was based on a misreading of Postal Service data, and the USPS stated that it had skipped some steps to get ballots to election offices faster.

On February 15, 2021, Raw Story reported that South Dakota Governor Kristi Noem had used a state airplane to travel to conservative political events. The report led Democratic lawmakers to formally request that the state's attorney general investigate Noem.

The outlet has also reported on far-right extremists, including a report on January 6, 2021, hours before the attack on the U.S. Capitol that "predicted exactly what would happen," according to Editor & Publisher. Raw Story was among the first to report on instigators of the riots, including an alleged attempt by the Oath Keepers to get then-President Trump to declare martial law using the Insurrection Act.

In 2023, Raw Story was the first outlet to report on the re-indictments of the founders of the Rise Above Movement, a California white nationalist group known for actively seeking out and engaging in street brawls. It was also the first to report that cyberthieves stole $690,000 from the campaign of Senator Jerry Moran, and $150,000 was stolen from the campaign of Rep. Troy Nehls.

Raw Story investigated a teenage gang linked to a spate of racist vandalism in 2024. Its coverage drew national attention and the ire of neo-Nazis, who organized a protest outside the home of a Raw Story reporter. "The amount of harassment and threats kind of validates the importance of the story," Jordan Green told The Washington Post. The same year, Green revealed a "deep state" target list generated by Ivan Raiklin, a retired Army Reserve lieutenant colonel and former intelligence employee, who billed himself as President Donald Trump's "secretary of retribution." Raiklin's list of more than 300 of Trump's political foes included Democratic and Republican elected officials; FBI agents; U.S. Capitol Police officers and numerous journalists.

== Awards and recognition ==
In 2008, the Online News Association named Raw Story a finalist in the 2008 Online Journalism Awards in the "Investigative, Small Site" category for the article "The permanent Republican majority", which revealed improper partisan influence in the prosecution of former Governor Don Siegelman of Alabama.

In 2021, a Raw Story report by Daniel Newhauser broke the story on South Dakota Governor Kristi Noem's use of the state airplane for non-official purposes, which resulted in criminal investigations. The investigative reporting was a finalist for a 2022 Society of Professional Journalists award which "honors a journalist or news organization for outstanding use of public records in reporting or advocacy of rights such as press freedom and public access."

In 2022, Raw Story won the first place EPPY Award by Editor & Publisher in the category "Best news/political blog (1 million or more unique visitors)" for "How I left the far right", an opinion piece by Dakota Adams, son of Oath Keepers' founder Stewart Rhodes, that described how Adams became disillusioned with the anti-government militia group in the later days of the Trump administration. Raw Story was also named the best U.S. news and political blog by Editor & Publisher in 2023.

In 2023, Raw Story investigative reporter Jordan Green won the Fair Media Council's Folio Award for his coverage of the January 6, 2021, US Capitol riot. Four Raw Story journalists also won Folio Awards in 2024.

In 2024, Raw Story's Alexandria Jacobson won a Society for Advancing Business Editing and Writing Best in Business award for its "Lawmakers, Law Breakers" series, which exposed Democratic and Republican lawmakers who violated U.S. conflict of interest and insider trading laws. It received honorable mentions in two other categories. The series also won the first place inaugural ION Award in 2023, which called the nonpartisan investigation "fair, bold, specific, and thoroughly documented", and a first place award from the National Federation of Press Women in 2024. Jacobson also won a Sidney award and a first place NFPW award for a feature article that illuminated an epidemic of violence against U.S. Mail carriers.

In 2024, Raw Story was named to Editor & Publisher's News Media's 10 to watch.

== Reception and criticism ==
Major media outlets have called Raw Story an investigative news site, progressive, left-leaning, independent, and an alternative news site. Raw Story has performed exclusive interviews, investigative reporting, and has broken many stories. Raw Story articles have been recognized by Columbia Journalism Review and the Associated Press, and been mentioned by other news agencies such as Reuters. Raw Story primarily aggregates stories from around the web and produces investigative reporting.

An August 2017 study by the Berkman Klein Center for Internet & Society found that between May 1, 2015, and November 7, 2016, Raw Story was the fourth and fifth most popular left-wing news source on Twitter and Facebook, respectively. The study also found that Raw Story was the 9th most shared media source on Twitter by Hillary Clinton supporters during the 2016 United States presidential election. Another study found that rawstory.com also featured prominently on the list of links shared by a Russian troll farm via Twitter.

In 2009, libertarian journalist Michael Moynihan referred to Raw Story as a "conspiracy-friendly" website. In 2016, ad verification company DoubleVerify, which helps advertisers select which types of websites their automated online ads might appear on, created a new category called "Inflammatory Politics & News", one of 75 categories. The new category was to include "hardcore conservative and liberal sites", and included rawstory.com as well as several far-right websites. A 2018 report by the Oxford Internet Institute categorized Raw Story as one of the "Top 30 Junk News Sources on Twitter." Some consider Raw Story a hyperpartisan media outlet.

A 2022 study published in the journal Discourse & Society by researchers in the UK on the subject of "polysemous terms in news titles" used by way of example the headline of a 2020 Raw Story article which used the vague phrase "cashing in on", which the authors said "could be interpreted both as merely getting financial revenue from a situation or taking advantage of a situation in an unfair way". The study was proposing the avoidance of using polysemous terms in news headlines because it could lead to "semi-fake news" due to readers getting their news by scrolling headlines and not actually reading articles.

== Staff ==
As of November 2024, Roxanne Cooper was publisher, Adam Nichols was editor-in-chief, and Brad Reed was managing editor. Editorial staff are members of the Washington-Baltimore Newspaper Guild. Notable former editorial staff include New York Times senior staff editor Michael Roston, NBC News political reporter Sahil Kapur, and former Village Voice executive editor Tony Ortega.
