= Jon McCormack =

Photographer, conservationist, Apple Engineer

- Jon McCormack lecturing at The Explorer's Club in New York City

Jon McCormack is an Australian conservation photographer, explorer, and technology executive now based in the US. He is vice president of camera and photo software engineering at Apple Inc., where he leads development of the camera system for the iPhone. He is a Fellow of the Royal Geographical Society and a member of The Explorers Club. His photography has been published by TIME, The New York Times, The Wall Street Journal, The Guardian, CNN, The Telegraph, National Geographic, and UNESCO.

== Early life and education ==
McCormack grew up on a sheep, cattle, and wheat farm in Surat, outside of Toowoomba, Queensland, Australia. His first camera, a fully manual model with an external light meter, was gifted by his father, who encouraged him to use it. Living an hour and a half's drive from the nearest place to develop film meant that a month could pass between taking a photograph and seeing the result. He has described that experience as instilling an intentional approach to his photography: "Photography was this very slow and very thoughtful process. Film cost money and developing cost money and, growing up in the bush, there wasn't a tremendous amount of that to go around either."

McCormack earned a Bachelor of Computer Science with first class honours from the University of Queensland.

== Career ==
McCormack joined Apple Inc. in April 2018 as vice president of camera and photo software engineering, having previously served as Chief Technology Officer of Amazon Devices and in senior roles at Google and Hewlett Packard. At Apple, he now oversees the development of iPhone camera software, with an emphasis on computational photography. He has described Apple's design philosophy as rooted in "humanity and the human experience", with the goal of enabling anyone to take high-quality photographs without needing technical knowledge.

He has been cited in technology press coverage in connection with major iPhone launches, including the iPhone 12 in 2020, the iPhone 15 in 2023, and the iPhone 17 in 2025. In 2025, he was named in The Australian's Top 100 Innovators list.

McCormack has been serious about photography for over 40 years, describing himself as a "pattern photographer," with a focus on natural geometries, from microscopic details to vast aerial landscapes.

== Memberships ==
He is also a fellow of the Royal Geographical Society and a member of The Explorers Club.

== Bibliography ==
- Patterns: Art of the Natural World (Damiani, 2026; ISBN 978-88-6208-857-2)

McCormack's first monograph was published by Damiani on Earth Day (22 April 2026) and contains 90 photographs across 168 pages, spanning six continents and scales from microscopic imagery to aerial landscapes. It was featured in National Geographic, The Times, and Euronews and includes essays by biologist David George Haskell, National Geographic Explorers Wade Davis and Sylvia Earle, photographer Ami Vitale, and Rainforest Alliance founder Daniel Katz. All proceeds from sales benefit Vital Impacts, a women-led nonprofit that supports conservation storytelling.
