= Comen =

Comen or COMEN may refer to:

- COMEN Cup, former water-polo competition
- Komen, settlement in Slovenia alternatively spelled Comen

== People with the name ==
- Elizabeth Comen, American oncologist and writer
