= John K. Byrne =

Publisher, writer, and non-profit director

John Byrne
- Born: March 24, 1981 (age 45); New York City, U.S.
- Education: Oberlin College (2003)
- Occupations: Publisher; Journalist; Writer; Founder, chairman and CEO of Raw Story

John K. Byrne (born March 24, 1981) is an American publisher and writer. He is co-owner of Raw Story Media and AlterNet Media, which publish the online progressive political news sites RawStory.com and AlterNet.org respectively. Prior to Raw Story, he wrote briefly for The Boston Globe and McClatchy Newspapers and has been published in The Atlantic.

== Early life and education ==
Byrne was raised in a suburb of Boston, Massachusetts, by Catherine and Jeffrey Byrne. Catherine Byrne is a circuit judge of the Massachusetts District Courts and Jeffrey Byrne is a retired family physician.

Byrne attended Concord Academy and graduated from Oberlin College in 2003. At Oberlin College, he founded The Grape, which remains the college’s alternative student newspaper. He was also editor of The Oberlin Review, where he wrote an exposé about steroid abuse on the football team.

== Career ==
During college, Byrne worked as a stringer for The Boston Globe Northwest, a since-discontinued suburban section of the newspaper, and for McClatchy Newspapers as an intern in Washington, DC.

Byrne founded RawStory.com, which was first published on February 1, 2004. The site was originally conceived as a liberal version of the Drudge Report. In the early years, Raw Story focused on reporting on anti-gay political figures who were themselves closeted gays. Byrne founded Raw Story when he was 23. In 2010, Byrne stepped down as editor of Raw Story. He remains the company's CEO.

In 2018, Byrne and his business partner, Michael Rogers, acquired the progressive news website AlterNet from the nonprofit Independent Media Institute, and The New Civil Rights Movement.

In 2022, John Byrne was named to the Out 100, Out magazine's compilation of the year's most impactful and influential LGBTQ+ people.

=== Outing of political figures ===
Byrne and Rogers outed as gay numerous politicians and political staff who voted or advocated against gay rights in the mid-2000s. Among the first was former Republican Congressman Ed Schrock (R-VA). Byrne was also involved in the outing of former Rep. David Dreier (R-CA).

== HIV prevention advocacy ==
In 2015, Byrne began advocating for the promotion of pre-exposure prophylaxis (PrEP) after a false positive HIV test. His first campaign on Miami Beach was covered by the Miami Herald, “I AM PrEP,” which involved posters created for bars and clubs and brochures for health centers. The campaigns were expanded into the Latino community and developed from passing out brochures to using online 'peer navigators' (influencers) on social media. In 2017, Byrne founded Prevention Access Campaign, a nonprofit dedicated to promoting PrEP in Miami-Dade and Broward counties. It was renamed Prevention305 the following year.

In 2019, Prevention305 helped start a mobile clinic which does cancer screening and PrEP in partnership with a local cancer center and the University of Miami School of Medicine.
