= National Academies Communication Award =

The National Academies Communication Award was an annual prize bestowed in recognition of creative works that help the public understand topics in science, engineering or medicine. The awards were established in 2003 and administered by the Keck Futures Initiative, a project of the National Academy of Sciences, the National Academy of Engineering and the Institute of Medicine that was funded by the W.M. Keck Foundation. The National Academies Keck Futures Initiative Ended in 2017 and the final report was published in 2018. The Awards continued through 2019. A $20,000 prize was awarded in each of four categories: Book, Film/Radio/TV, Magazine/Newspaper, and Online. The Online category was created in 2009.

In 2022, the National Academies launched, in partnership with Schmidt Futures, the Eric and Wendy Schmidt Awards for Excellence in Science Communication to recognize and develop excellence in science communication by research scientists and by early career, local, and freelance science journalists. The program provides winners with cash awards as well as training and resources to further expand their communication skills.

== List of recipients ==
=== Book ===
2019
Carl Zimmer
She Has Her Mother’s Laugh: The Powers, Perversions, and Potential of Heredity

"A sweeping yet engaging examination from a personal perspective of the evolving nature of the scientific understanding of heredity across the centuries. The book debunks many of the insidious and profoundly unscientific distortions of heredity, including those that have provided faulty foundations for racism and eugenics – and illuminates the 21st century applications with the greatest promise for transforming people’s lives."

2018
Dan Egan
The Death and Life of the Great Lakes

"An environmental, historical, and economic analysis, thoroughly researched and compellingly told, of America's Great Lakes and the unintended consequences of short-sighted management decisions."

2017
Margot Lee Shetterly
Hidden Figures: The American Dream and the Untold Story of the Black Women Mathematicians Who Helped Win the Space Race

"A hitherto little-known episode in the history of pioneering aerospace engineering and computing brought to light so engagingly that, along with the blockbuster movie it inspired, has had an unprecedented impact on the American public."

2016
Deborah Cramer
The Narrow Edge: A Tiny Bird, an Ancient Crab, and an Epic Journey

"A beautifully written natural history of an imperiled bird that embeds evolutionary biology and systematics, marine ecology, physiology, natural history, paleontology, cultural history, and immunology in an absorbing, personal narrative"

2015
Mark Miodownik
Stuff Matters: Exploring the Marvelous Materials That Shape Our Man-Made World

"A fascinating account of the extraordinary nature of the seemingly ordinary materials of modern-day life."

2014
Dan Fagin
Toms River: A Story of Science and Salvation
"…for its masterful portrayal of the scientific process at work in a town facing environmental crisis."
2013
David George Haskell
The Forest Unseen
"…for his exquisite portrait of nature's universe, drawn from one tiny patch of forest."
2012
Daniel Kahneman
Thinking, Fast and Slow
"An outstanding and accessible book that brings to the public key scientific insights about how we think and make decisions."
2011
Rebecca Skloot
The Immortal Life of Henrietta Lacks
2010
Richard Holmes
The Age of Wonder
2009
Neil Shubin
Your Inner Fish
2008
Walter Isaacson
Einstein: His Life and Universe
2007
Eric Kandel
In Search of Memory
2006
Charles C. Mann
1491: New Revelations of the Americas Before Columbus
2005
John M. Barry
The Great Influenza: The Epic Story of the Greatest Plague in History
2004
Matt Ridley
The Agile Gene: How Nature Turns on Nurture
2003
Carl Safina
Eye of the Albatross: Visions of Hope and Survival

=== Film/Radio/TV ===
2013	Joanne Silberner, David Baron	PRI's The World	"Cancer's Lonely Soldier," "Pink Ribbons to Haiti," "An Ounce of Prevention," and "The Infectious Connection" ("light on the hidden toll cancer takes in impoverished nations")
2012	Paula S. Apsell, Michael Bicks, and Julia Cort	WGBH-TV NOVA	"Smartest Machine on Earth"
2011	Alexa Elliott	WPBT2	"Changing Seas: Sentinels of the Seas"
2010	Carole and Richard Rifkind	WNET	Naturally Obsessed: The Making of a Scientist
2009	Larry Adelman, Llewellyn M. Smith, and Christine Herbes-Sommers	California Newsreel and Vital Pictures	Unnatural Causes: Is Inequality Making Us Sick?
2008	George Butler	White Mountain Films, The Kennedy/Marshall Company and The Walt Disney Company	Roving Mars
2007	Jad Abumrad	WNYC Radiolab	"Musical Language" and "Where am I?"
2006	Nick Young, Anna Thomson, and Bill Locke	The History Channel and Lion Television	"Ape to Man"
2005	Thomas Levenson and Paula Apsell	WGBH-TV NOVA	“Origins: Back to the Beginning.”
2004	Sue Norton and David Clark	The Science Channel	"Science of the Deep: Mid-Water Mysteries."
2003	Joe Palca	National Public Radio	"series of news stories for radio about the scientific and human dimensions of cloning."

=== Magazine/Newspaper ===
2013	Eliot Marshall, Elizabeth Culotta, Ann Gibbons, and Greg Miller	Science	Special issue on human conflict (May 18, 2012): "Parsing Terrorism," "Roots of Racism," "The Ultimate Sacrifice," and "Drone Wars"
2012	Crocker Stephenson, Guy Boulton, Mark Johnson, and John Schmid	Milwaukee Journal Sentinel	"Empty Cradles"
2011	Amy Harmon	The New York Times	"Target: Cancer"
2010	Charles Duhigg	The New York Times	"Toxic Waters"
2009	Mark Johnson	Milwaukee Journal Sentinel	"Targeting the Good Cell"
2008	Bob Marshall, Mark Schleifstein, Dan Swenson, and Ted Jackson	The Times-Picayune	"Last Chance: The Fight to Save a Disappearing Coast", "an outstanding newspaper series that combines superb storytelling with the latest science in its call to action to save Louisiana's wetlands"
2007	Carl Zimmer	freelance writer	"for his diverse and consistently interesting coverage of evolution and unexpected biology"
2006	Elizabeth Kolbert	The New Yorker	"The Climate of Man"
2005	Gareth Cook	The Boston Globe	“The Stem Cell Debate.”
2004	Richard Lee Hotz	The Los Angeles Times	"Butterfly on a Bullet"
2003	Andrew Revkin	The New York Times	"series of articles on the complex science and policy issues of global climate change"

=== Online ===
2013	Alison Young and Peter Eisler (reporters), John Hillkirk (content editor), and the entire team	USA TODAY	series "Ghost Factories" a nationwide investigation of abandoned lead factories
2012	Daniel Engber	Slate	"The Mouse Trap: How One Rodent Rules the Lab"
2011	Andrew Revkin	The New York Times and Pace University	Dot Earth blog
2010	Ed Yong	discovermagazine.com	"Not Exactly Rocket Science" blog
2009	Vikki Valentine, Alison Richards, and Anne Gudenkauf	NPR News	for Climate Connections, a yearlong multimedia journey to explain the impacts of global climate change with well-reported stories from around the world
2008	Alan Boyle	MSNBC.com	" for selected works from Cosmic Log and his pioneering efforts to bring daily coverage of the physical sciences, technological innovation and space sciences to broad new audiences on a popular news web site"
