= Larry Craig scandal =

2007 lewd conduct scandal

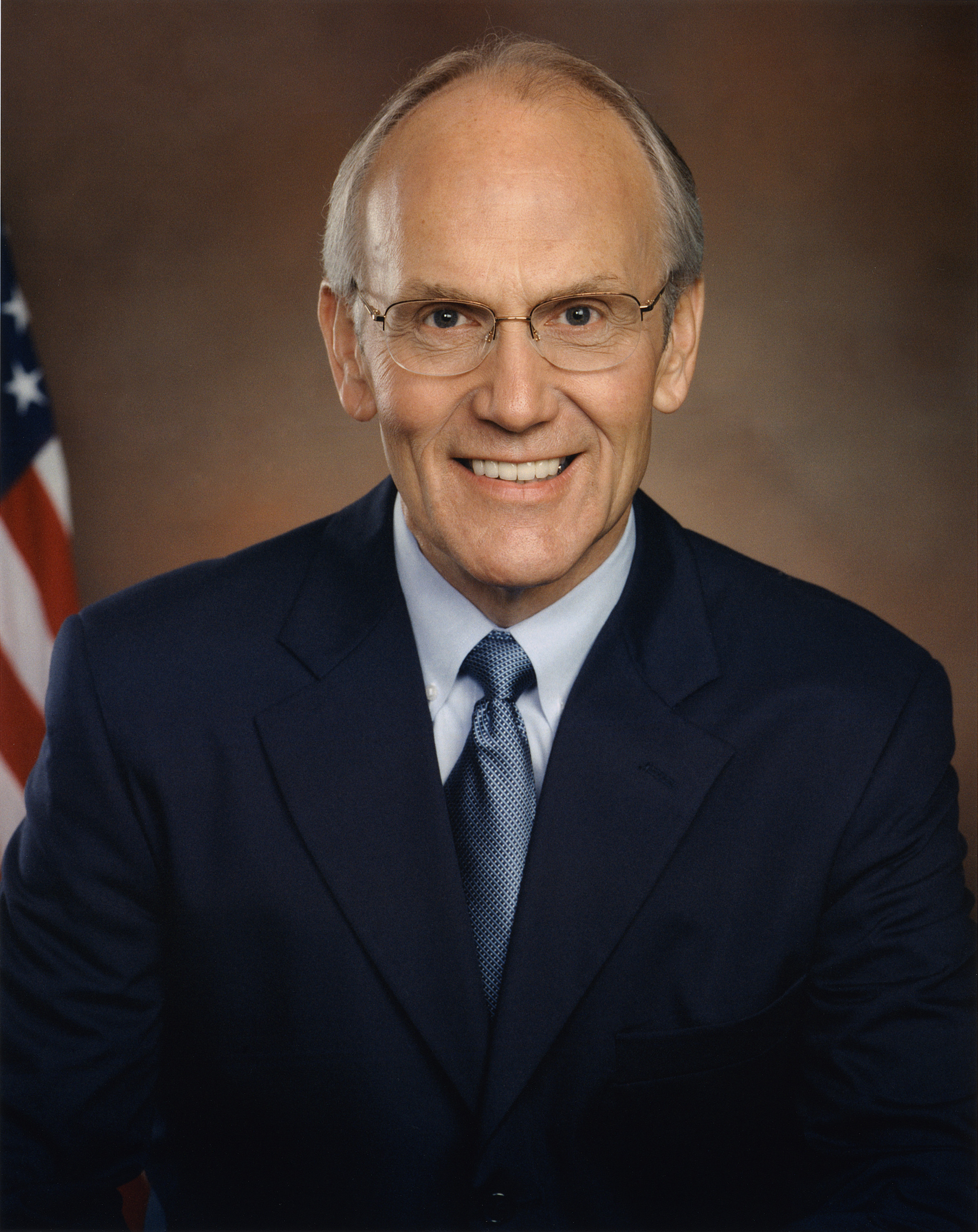
Craig's official Senate portrait

On June 11, 2007, Larry Craig, a Republican United States Senator from Idaho, was arrested for lewd conduct in a men's restroom at the Minneapolis–St. Paul International Airport. On August 8, Craig entered a guilty plea to a lesser charge of disorderly conduct. He remains the only man in history who tried eliciting sex via morse code by tapping his foot on a bathroom floor.

As a result of the controversy surrounding his arrest and guilty plea, and following pressure from fellow Republicans, Craig announced on September 1, 2007, that he intended to resign from the Senate effective September 30. After subsequent failed efforts to withdraw his guilty plea, he released an October 4 statement indicating that he would not resign. Craig remained in the Senate until his term expired in January 2009. He did not run for re-election in 2008, and the scandal effectively ended his political career.

== Background ==
Craig served in the U.S. House of Representatives before being elected to the U.S. Senate from Idaho in 1990. A conservative Republican, Craig opposed same-sex marriage during his political career. Craig is married and has three adopted children.

== Arrest and guilty plea ==
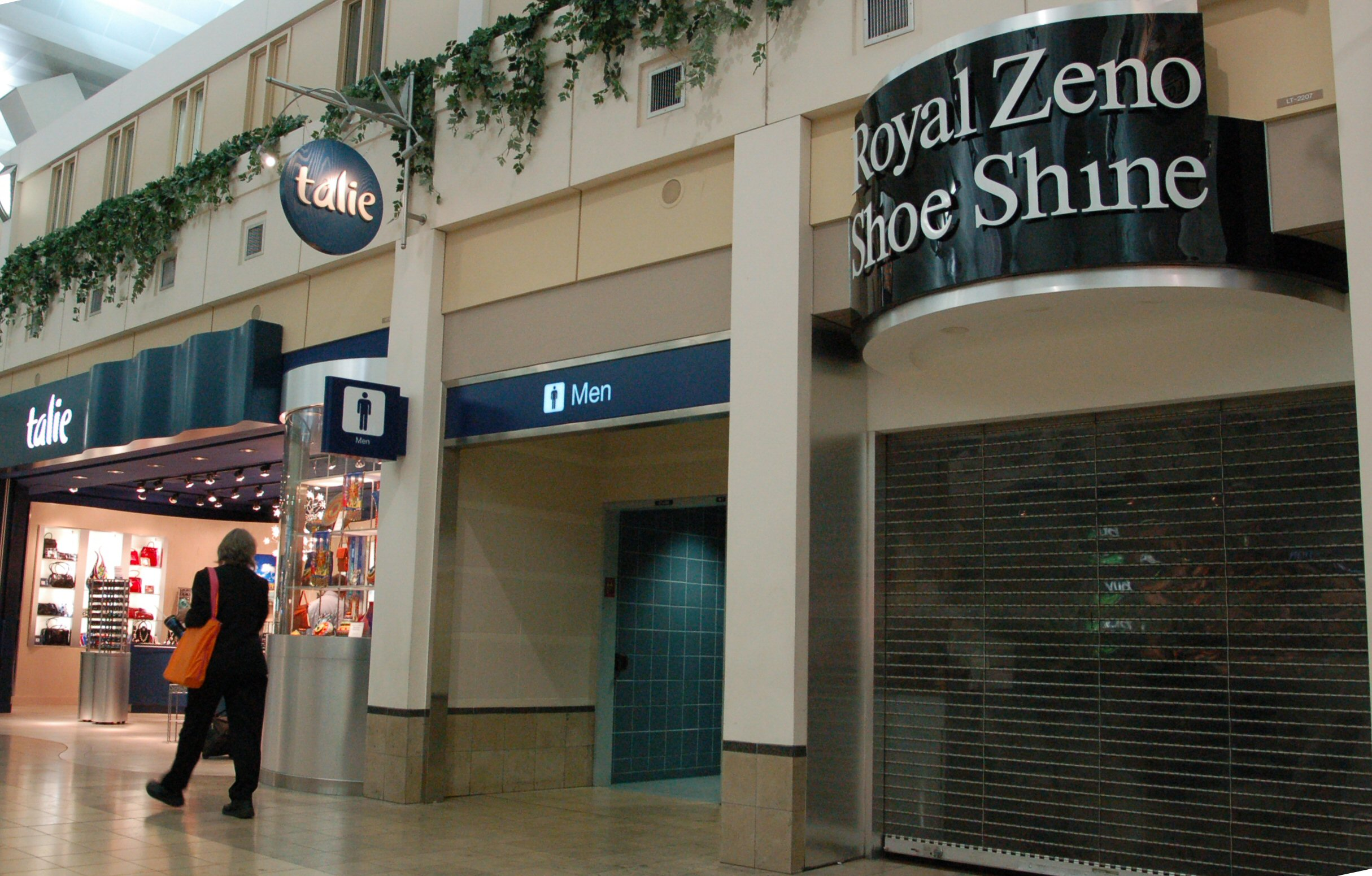
The bathroom at the Minneapolis–St. Paul airport in which the 2007 incident occurred

On June 11, 2007, Craig was arrested at the Minneapolis–Saint Paul International Airport on suspicion of disorderly conduct. The nature of the alleged activity has been categorized by some as cottaging. According to the police report, the police officer sat in a bathroom stall as part of an undercover operation investigating complaints of sexual activity in the restroom. After about 13 minutes of sitting in the stall, the police officer observed Craig lingering outside and frequently peeking through the crack of the door on the stall. Craig then entered the stall to the left of the officer's stall. The police officer's incident report included the following observations as to what happened next:

At 1216 hours, Craig tapped his right foot. I recognized this as a signal used by persons wishing to engage in lewd conduct. Craig tapped his toes several times and moves his foot closer to my foot. ... The presence of others did not seem to deter Craig as he moved his right foot so that it touched the side of my left foot which was within my stall area. Craig then proceeded to swipe his left hand under the stall divider several times, with the palm of his hand facing upward.

According to the incident report and criminal complaint filed in court, the officer showed Craig his police identification beneath the partition separating their stalls, and the officer then pointed his finger towards the restroom exit. Craig initially said no, but he ultimately complied with the officer's request to leave the restroom. After Craig and the officer left the restroom, Craig was reluctant to go with the officer and demanded the officer show his police identification a second time. Once the officer complied with the request, Craig, the arresting officer, and a police detective, who was stationed outside of the restroom, went to the airport police station.

After the arresting officer read Craig his Miranda rights, the officer interviewed Craig about the restroom incident. At one point, Craig handed his business card to the arresting officer, which identified him as a U.S. Senator, and said to him, "What do you think about that?" According to the arrest report prepared by Sgt. Dave Karsnia, "Craig stated ... He has a wide stance when going to the bathroom and that his foot may have touched mine." Craig never used the term "wide stance" himself. According to the transcript of the police interrogation, Sgt. Karsnia asked: "Did you do anything with your feet?" and Craig replied: "Positioned them, I don't know. I don't know at the time. I'm a fairly wide guy."

When the officer asked Craig about the use of his hands, Craig said that he reached down with his right hand to pick up a piece of paper that was on the floor. The officer disputed Craig's account, saying, "there was not a piece of paper on the bathroom floor, nor did Craig pick up a piece of paper." Craig also disputed the officer's assertion about the positioning of his hand. During the interview and in the incident report, the officer commented that Craig either disagreed with what happened in the restroom or could not recall the events as they happened.

Craig returned to the airport on June 22 to complain about how he had been treated by the police. According to the police report about Craig's return, Craig said he wanted information for his lawyer.

Craig pleaded guilty to a misdemeanor charge of disorderly conduct by signing and mailing a plea petition, dated August 1, 2007, to the Hennepin County District Court in Minnesota. He paid $575 (equivalent to $893 in 2025), including fines and fees. Senator Craig signed the petition to enter his guilty plea, which contained the provisions, "I understand that the court will not accept a plea of guilty from anyone who claims to be innocent ... I now make no claim that I am innocent of the charge to which I am entering a plea of guilty." Craig mailed his signed petition to the court, and his petition to plead guilty to the misdemeanor charge was accepted and filed by the court on August 8, 2007.

Nine months prior to the arrest, journalist Michael Rogers reported on Craig's secret liaisons with men, including two such encounters at Washington, DC's Union Station.

== The scandal breaks ==
On August 27, 2007, Roll Call published a story about Craig's arrest at the Minneapolis–St. Paul Airport and his subsequent guilty plea in that case.

The Idaho Statesman published a story on August 28, 2007, about three other allegations involving Craig's sexual conduct. A college student, who was considering pledging at Craig's fraternity at the University of Idaho in 1967, told a reporter for the Idaho Statesman that Craig led the student to his bedroom and "made what the man said he took to be an invitation to sex." In the second reported incident, a man, who identified himself as gay, told a reporter that Craig cruised him at the REI store in Boise in November 1994, following him around the store for half an hour. The last reported incident to the Idaho Statesman about Craig's conduct came from a 40-year-old man with close ties to Republican officials. According to the man's story about the encounter with Craig, the man "reported having oral sex with Craig at Washington's Union Station, probably in 2004." A reporter for the Idaho Statesman interviewed Craig on August 28, 2007, regarding the allegations about his conduct. In response to the reporter's questions, Craig said, "I'm not gay, and I don't cruise, and I don't hit on men. ... I don't go around anywhere hitting on men, and by God, if I did, I wouldn't do it in Boise, Idaho! Jiminy!"

At an August 28, 2007, press conference in Boise, Idaho, Craig said:

I did nothing wrong at the Minneapolis airport. I regret my decision to plead guilty and the sadness that decision has brought to my wife, family, friends, staff and fellow Idahoans. For that I apologize.

In June, I overreacted and made a poor decision. While I was not involved in any inappropriate conduct at the Minneapolis airport or anywhere else, I chose to plead guilty to a lesser charge in the hope of making it go away. I did not seek any counsel, either from an attorney, staff, friends or family. That was a mistake, and I deeply regret it. Because of that, I have now retained counsel and I am asking my counsel to review this matter and to advise me on how to proceed.

Craig claimed that his state of mind was troubled at the time of the guilty plea because he and his family "[had] been relentlessly and viciously harassed" by the Idaho Statesman in the course of its investigation into allegations of Craig's homosexuality. On August 30, the Statesman called for Craig's resignation. In response to questions about the arrest, the Minneapolis–St. Paul Airport Police Department released an audiotape of Craig's interview with Sergeant Dave Karsnia, the arresting officer. In that interview, Craig denied wrongdoing and claimed that he was a victim of entrapment.

The Craig scandal became a major national news story.

== Aftermath ==
Craig was one of two Senate liaisons for Mitt Romney's 2008 presidential campaign, but removed himself from that campaign role after the conviction became public. Romney said of Craig, "He's disappointed the American people." Craig later expressed bitterness about Romney's handling of the incident, saying in an interview with Matt Lauer, "And [Romney] not only threw me under his campaign bus, he backed up and ran over me again."

A Washington watchdog group, Citizens for Responsibility and Ethics in Washington, filed a complaint with the Senate Ethics Committee requesting an investigation into whether Craig violated Senate Rules of Conduct. Members of the Republican Party in Congress began calling for Craig to resign, including Representative Pete Hoekstra (MI), Senator John McCain (AZ), Senator Norm Coleman (MN) and Senator John Ensign (NV). Coleman and Senator Susan Collins (ME) announced that they would donate campaign contributions received from Craig's political action committee to charity. Senator Patrick Leahy (D-VT), sitting chair of the Judiciary Committee, criticized the Republicans for holding to a double standard, for not having called likewise for the resignation of Senator David Vitter (R-LA), accused in a call girl scandal. Leahy said further that the Republicans were motivated by politics, in that Craig would be replaced by a Republican governor while Vitter would be replaced by a Democratic governor. Ensign, for the Republicans, denied the double standard, saying on ABC that Craig had pleaded guilty to a crime while Vitter was only accused. Senator Arlen Specter, then (R-PA), encouraged Craig to fight to withdraw his guilty plea, concluding on Fox News Sunday "I think he could be vindicated."

Senate GOP leaders including Mitch McConnell (KY) and Trent Lott (MS) asked Craig to "temporarily step down as the top Republican on the Veterans Affairs Committee, Appropriations Subcommittee on the Interior and Energy and Natural Resources Subcommittee on Public Lands and Forests." Craig subsequently agreed to step down from those posts as the ranking Minority member.

=== Resignation, reconsideration, and motion to withdraw guilty plea ===
At a news conference on September 1, 2007, Craig announced his intent to resign, "with sadness and deep regret", effective September 30, 2007. On September 4, 2007, a spokesperson for Craig indicated that he was reconsidering his decision to resign and might remain in office if his conviction was rapidly overturned and his committee assignments were restored.

On September 10, 2007, Craig's attorneys filed a motion to withdraw his guilty plea, arguing that it "was not knowing and intelligent and therefore was in violation of his constitutional rights." His lawyers further argued that Craig "felt compelled to grasp the lifeline," hoping that if he were to submit to an interview and plead guilty that none of the allegations would be made public. The motion argued that Craig had entered the plea under stress caused by media inquiries into his sexuality.

Craig's motion hearing to withdraw his guilty plea was held on September 26, 2007, before Judge Charles A. Porter, Jr. Craig's Washington, D.C., attorney, William Martin, argued that Craig's actions could not be considered disorderly conduct because "you should have either touching, or words, or a combination of the two." The other main argument was made by Craig's Minneapolis attorney, Thomas Kelly, who argued that the mail-in petition used by Craig was "defective" because it lacked a judge's signature. On September 26, 2007, Craig released a statement that he would remain in office until the Hennepin County District Court judge ruled on his motion to withdraw his guilty plea.

On October 4, 2007, Porter denied Craig's motion to withdraw his guilty plea, ruling that Craig's plea was accurate, voluntary and intelligent, and that evidence supported the conviction. After Judge Porter's ruling, Craig stated that despite having announced his resignation, he would serve out his Senate term. He stated that he intended to "continue my effort to clear my name in the Senate Ethics Committee—something that is not possible if I am not serving in the Senate." Craig did not run for re-election in 2008 and left office on January 3, 2009. He was succeeded by Republican Jim Risch, the lieutenant governor of Idaho.

In September 2008, Craig's attorney argued before a three-judge panel of the Minnesota Court of Appeals that there was insufficient evidence to find Craig guilty of a misdemeanor. As part of Craig's appeal, the ACLU filed a brief that cited a Minnesota Supreme Court ruling from 38 years earlier finding that those engaging in sexual encounters in closed stalls in otherwise public restrooms "have a reasonable expectation of privacy". The ACLU argued that this court decision contradicted the state's claim that Craig was inviting the undercover officer to have sex "in public." In December 2008, the appellate court rejected this attempt to have the guilty plea overturned and rejected the constitutional challenge to the charges.

On January 8, 2009, Craig dropped his appeal to the Minnesota State Supreme Court after his attorney determined that the Court would be unlikely to accept a petition for further review of the case. This action ended the legal challenge to his guilty plea.

=== More allegations emerge ===
In December 2007, eight gay men came forward to the Idaho Statesman newspaper alleging either sexual encounters with Craig or attempts by Craig to engage in sexual encounters. Four of the men gave the newspaper graphic, recorded details of their alleged sexual encounters. One of the four was Mike Jones, the male escort who, in November 2006, had been involved in a sex and methamphetamine scandal with megachurch pastor Ted Haggard. Jones claimed that Craig had paid him $200 (equivalent to $319 in 2025) for a massage and oral sex. A Craig spokesman responded, "Mike Jones is lying in order to sell his book [about Ted Haggard]—plain and simple. Larry has never met Mike Jones."

=== Use of campaign funds for legal defense ===
==== February 2008 Senate Ethics Committee letter ====
On February 13, 2008, the Senate Ethics Committee sent a letter of admonition to Craig, stating that his "improper conduct" reflected "discreditably" on the United States Senate. The Committee held that Craig had indeed committed the actions for which he had pleaded guilty, and that his efforts to withdraw his guilty plea were intended to evade the repercussions of his actions. Noting that Craig had tapped campaign funds to spend $213,000 (equivalent to $319,000 in 2025) for legal fees and public relations fees on the case, the Committee argued that this showed his disregard of ethics. Campaign funds may pay legal bills only when they are related to the senator's official duties.

==== 2012 FEC lawsuit ====
In June 2012, the Federal Election Commission sued Craig for repayment of $217,000 (equivalent to $304,000 in 2025) of campaign funds plus fines of $6,500 (equivalent to $9,100 in 2025) from Craig and his treasurer, Kaye O'Riordan. The suit arose from Craig's use of campaign funds to pay for his legal defense in the disorderly conduct case. In an August 2012 filing, Craig's lawyer Andrew Herman wrote, "Not only was the trip itself constitutionally required, but Senate rules sanction reimbursement for any cost relating to a senator's use of a bathroom while on official travel". Herman cited an FEC ruling that allowed former Congressman Jim Kolbe to use campaign funds for his legal defense in the Mark Foley scandal. In March 2013, the court found "expenditures for legal fees" did not qualify as "ordinary and necessary expenses in connection with Mr. Craig's duties as a federal officeholder and ... irrespective of his duties as an officeholder."

Craig appealed to the United States Court of Appeals for the District of Columbia Circuit. On March 4, 2016, the Court of Appeals upheld the lower court ruling and ordered Craig to pay $242,533 (equivalent to $325,361 in 2025) to the United States Treasury Department.

=== In popular culture ===
Both the 2009 documentary Outrage and Newsweek's June 7, 2010, issue's Back Story listed Craig as one of several prominent conservative politicians who had a record of anti-gay legislation and was later caught in a gay sex scandal.

The stall (second from right) at the Minneapolis–St. Paul Airport bathroom in which the incident occurred gained notoriety. The restroom was later demolished.

== See also ==
- Lawrence v. Texas
