= My Water's On Fire Tonight (The Fracking Song) =

2011 song by Explainer Music, LLC

"My Water's On Fire Tonight (The Fracking Song)" is a 2011 American song and accompanying music video about the environmental and public health effects of hydraulic fracturing ("fracking"), a method of extracting gas and oil.

The song was created by Explainer Music, LLC. David Holmes, co-founder of Explainer Music and a graduate of Studio 20, a New York University graduate program, used data collected by the investigative journalism group ProPublica to write "My Water's On Fire Tonight". Described by Studio 20 as an "explainer", it is a mini-documentary reflective of explanatory journalism.

Upon its release in 2011, the song and video received notable media attention for utilizing an unusual medium to report news and being one of the first widely received works of its kind, initiating a discussion of whether or not a music video could be considered a viable form of journalism.

The New York Times compared it to Gasland, while Andrew Revkin (also writing in the Times) gave it a "thumbs up" and praised its balanced message ("This is not a 'no fracking' song; it’s a song about taking responsibility for our energy choices"). The Huffington Post called it "creative and comprehensive" while Forbes called it an "interesting idea" and PBS noted that it "packs a surprising amount of information" into its short span.
