= Lindsey Fitzharris =

American author, medical historian, and television host

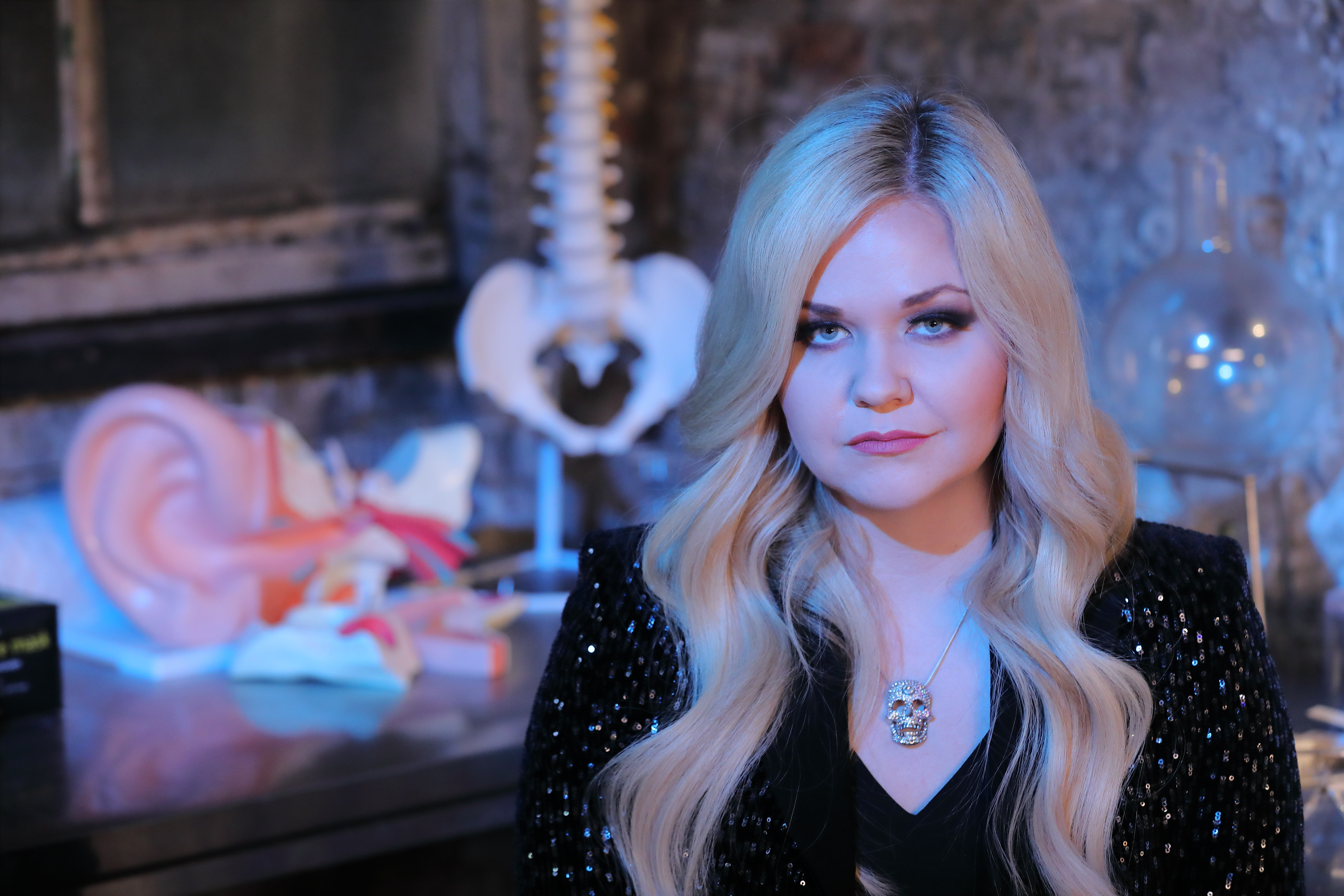
- Education: University of Oxford
- Occupations: Author, medical historian, television host
- Writing career
- Years active: 2017 – Present
- Subject: History of medicine
- Website: drlindseyfitzharris.com

Lindsey Fitzharris (born 1982) is an American author, medical historian, and television host. She is the creator of the blog The Chirurgeon's Apprentice, and the writer and host of the Smithsonian Channel TV series The Curious Life and Death of.... She is a resident of the United Kingdom.

== Career ==
Fitzharris holds a Ph.D. in the History of Science, Medicine & Technology, received from the University of Oxford in 2009. She was awarded a postdoctoral award from the Wellcome Trust in 2010.

In 2017, she published The Butchering Art: Joseph Lister's Quest to Transform the Grisly World of Victorian Medicine, a biography of surgical pioneer Joseph Lister. The book won the PEN/E. O. Wilson Literary Science Writing Award, and was named an American Library Association Notable Nonfiction book for 2018. The book was also shortlisted for the Wellcome Book Prize and Wolfson History Prize in the United Kingdom that same year. To date, The Butchering Art has been translated into fourteen languages.

Fitzharris has written for publications such as The Wall Street Journal, The Guardian, Scientific American, and New Scientist. In March 2019, Fitzharris appeared on The Joe Rogan Experience. Her interview was #1 on Chartable, with millions of downloads in the first week.

Fitzharris is also the writer and host of the television series, The Curious Life and Death of..., which premiered on the Smithsonian Channel in 2020.

Her second book, The Facemaker: A Visionary Surgeon's Battle to Mend the Disfigured Soldiers of World War I, about plastic surgery pioneer Harold Gillies, was released in 2022. The audiobook for The Facemaker was narrated by the actor Daniel Gillies, the great, great nephew of Sir Harold Gillies.

She appeared on BBC Radio 4's The Museum of Curiosity in October 2019. Her hypothetical donation to this imaginary museum was "A cemetery gun".

== Bibliography ==
- The Butchering Art: Joseph Lister's Quest to Transform the Grisly World of Victorian Medicine (2017) (Farrar, Straus and Giroux) ISBN 978-0374117290, OCLC 978250363
- The Facemaker: A Visionary Surgeon's Battle to Mend the Disfigured Soldiers of World War I (2022) (Farrar, Straus and Giroux) ISBN 978-0374282301
- Sleuth-Hound: The Case of the Real Sherlock Holmes (2026) (Farrar, Straus and Giroux) ISBN 978-0374609498
