= Amy Harmon =

American journalist (born 1968)

- Born: September 17, 1968 (age 57); New York City, U.S.
- Education: University of Michigan (BA)
- Occupation: Journalist
- Children: 1
- Awards: Pulitzer Prize for Explanatory Reporting (2008); National Academies Communication Award (2011)

Amy Harmon (born September 17, 1968) is an American journalist. She won a Pulitzer Prize as a correspondent for The New York Times covering the impact of science and technology on everyday life. Harmon uses narrative storytelling to illuminate the human dilemmas posed by advances in science. In 2013, she was named a Guggenheim Fellow. Her daughter Sasha Matthews is a cartoonist.

== Early life and education ==
Harmon was born in New York City in 1968. She received a B.A. degree in American Studies from the University of Michigan and began her career in journalism as the Opinion page editor of the Michigan Daily, the university's student newspaper.

== Career ==
Harmon was hired as a reporter for the Los Angeles Times and briefly covered the auto industry from the paper's Detroit bureau, before she moved to Los Angeles and started writing mainly about digital technology and science.

In 1997, she joined The New York Times. Three years later she wrote an article about a black internet entrepreneur and his white partner, "A Limited Partnership: The Black Internet Entrepreneur Had the Idea; The White One Became the Venture's Public Face". It was one of ten articles in a series on race relations for which The New York Times staff won the Pulitzer Prize for National Reporting. Harmon won the prize for Explanatory Reporting alone in 2008 for a series titled "The DNA Age" about the ramifications of new genetic technology. The award formally cited "her striking examination of the dilemmas and ethical issues that accompany DNA testing, using human stories to sharpen her reports." In 2011, Harmon's "Target Cancer" series, about the human testing of a new kind of cancer drug, received the National Academies Communication Award, the journalism award given by the National Academies of Science. Her article "Autistic and Seeking a Place in an Adult World" won the 2012 Casey Medal for excellence in reporting on children and families.

In 2013, she wrote the short e-book, Asperger Love: Searching for Romance When You're Not Wired to Connect, published in 2013 by New York Times/Byliner.

== Bibliography ==
=== Books ===
- Harmon, Amy (2013). Asperger love : searching for romance when you're not wired to connect (ebook). New York Times/Byliner.

=== Essays and reporting ===
- Harmon, Amy (February–March 2014). "Citrus fightback : race to save the orange by altering its DNA". Special Feature. Food Wars. Cosmos. 55: 56–62.
