= Ronald G. Amundson =

American environmental scientist

Ronald Amundson
- Education: University of California, Riverside
- Scientific career
- Fields: Isotope biogeochemistry, soil science
- Institutions: University of California, Berkeley
- Thesis: A chronosequential evaluation of the effects of reclamation on a saline-sodic soil (1984)
- Doctoral advisor: Lanny Lund
- Website: ourenvironment.berkeley.edu/people/ronald-amundson

Ronald Amundson is an American environmental scientist who is currently a professor at University of California, Berkeley.

== Early life and education ==
Amundson received his PhD from the University of California, Riverside in 1984. For this work, he had analyzed the carbon and oxygen stable isotopic ratios of calcium carbonate within the soils in the San Joaquin Valley.

== Research ==
His interests are isotope biogeochemistry, environment history & ethics, ecosystems, pedology and soils. His highest cited paper is "Rapid exchange between soil carbon and atmospheric carbon dioxide driven by temperature change" at 759 times, according to Google Scholar.

== Awards and honors ==
- 2019 – Elected Fellow of the American Geophysical Union

== Selected publications ==
- Amundson, Ronald; Austin, A. T.; Schuur, E. A. G.; Yoo, K.; Matzek, V.; Kendall, C.; Uebersax, A.; Brenner, D.; Baisden, W. T. (March 2003). "Global patterns of the isotopic composition of soil and plant nitrogen". Global Biogeochemical Cycles. 17 (1): 1031. Bibcode:2003GBioC..17.1031A. doi:10.1029/2002GB001903.
- Amundson, R. (May 2001). "The carbon budget in soils". Annual Review of Earth and Planetary Sciences. 29: 535–562. Bibcode:2001AREPS..29..535A. doi:10.1146/annurev.earth.29.1.535.
- Davidson, E. A.; Trumbore, S. E.; Amundson, R. (14 December 2000). "Biogeochemistry: soil warming and organic carbon content". Nature. 408 (6814): 789–790. Bibcode:2000Natur.408..789D. doi:10.1038/35048672. PMID 11130707. S2CID 4405090.
- Amundson, R.; Stern, L.; Baisden, T.; Wang, Y. (February 1998). "The isotopic composition of soil and soil-respired CO2". Geoderma. 82 (1–3): 83–114. Bibcode:1998Geode..82...83A. doi:10.1016/S0016-7061(97)00098-0.
- Arens, N. C.; Jahren, A. Hope; Amundson, R. (March 2000). "Can C3 plants faithfully record the carbon isotopic composition of atmospheric carbon dioxide?". Paleobiology. 26 (1): 137–164. Bibcode:2000Pbio...26..137A. doi:10.1666/0094-8373(2000)026<0137:ccpfrt>2.0.co;2. S2CID 86185648.
