= California Against the Sea =

2023 nonfiction book by Rosanna Xia

- Author: Rosanna Xia
- Cover artist: Adrian Montalvo
- Language: English
- Subject: Coastal zone management -- California Coast changes -- California Sea level -- California
- Genre: Nonfiction
- Publisher: Heyday
- Publication date: September 26, 2023
- Pages: 336
- ISBN: 9781597146197

California Against the Sea: Visions For Our Vanishing Coastline is a 2023 nonfiction book by American author and Los Angeles Times environmental reporter Rosanna Xia.

== Summary ==
Xia travels along the California coastal communities to interview indigenous leaders, community activists, politicians and environmental scientists on how their communities are responding to rising sea levels.

== Publication ==
The book was published by Heyday on September 26, 2023. The cover art was done by Adrian Montalvo and the design by Frances Baca.

== Reception ==
Peter Fish of the San Francisco Chronicle described the book as "thoughtful, balanced, deeply researched and reported." Publishers Weekly called it "a vivid exploration" and an "unsparing look at California’s contentious battle to cope with a changing climate."

== Awards and nominations ==
The book was the winner of the 2024 PEN/E. O. Wilson Literary Science Writing Award. It was also selected as the Great Read from California for the 2024 Library of Congress National Book Festival. It was included as part of the San Francisco Chronicle's favorite nonfiction books of 2023. The book was featured on The Architect's Newspaper's list of best books of 2023. The book was a recipient of the 2024 American Book Award by the Before Columbus Foundation.

Xia was selected as the American Energy Society's 2024 Energy Writer of the Year.

== See also ==
- coastal zone management
- Sea level rise
