= Lab Girl =

2016 memoir by Hope Jahren

- Author: Hope Jahren
- Cover artist: Jon Shireman, Kelly Blair
- Language: English
- Subject: Botany
- Genre: Memoir
- Published: 2016
- Publisher: Alfred A. Knopf, Penguin – Random House
- Publication place: United States
- Pages: 290
- Awards: National Book Critics Circle Award for Autobiography; The American Association for the Advancement of Science prize for Excellence in Science Books
- ISBN: 9781101874936
- Website: Lab Girl at Penguin Random House

Lab Girl is a 2016 memoir by the American geochemist, geobiologist and professor Hope Jahren, published by Alfred A. Knopf. It is the recipient of the National Book Critics Circle Award for Autobiography, a New York Times notable book, winner of the American Association for the Advancement of Science prize for Excellence in Science Books, a finalist for the PEN/E.O. Wilson Literary Science Writing Award, and was named one of the Best Books of the Year by The Washington Post, Time, NPR, Slate, Entertainment Weekly, Newsday, Minneapolis Star Tribune and Kirkus Reviews.

== Summary ==
Jahren's memoir is separated into three parts, excluding the prologue and the epilogue. Each section follows roughly the same pattern of one chapter that follows her life and one chapter that describes an element of her research or of general botanical facts. She describes an aspect of a plant's biology that acts as a metaphor for her life.

Part One, "Roots and Leaves", describes Jahren's childhood in rural Minnesota, through her undergraduate education at the University of Minnesota in Minneapolis. Then this section follows Jahren through her graduate education at the University of California, Berkeley, and the conference of her PhD. Ending with the beginning of her first academic job as an assistant professor at Georgia Institute of Technology. Jahren's relationship with her colleague and friend, Bill, begins in this section, and carries on throughout the book as one of the few constants in her life.

Part Two, "Wood and Knots", describes Jahren's experiences building her first laboratory in Georgia to her decision to leave Georgia Tech and take a position at Johns Hopkins University. She describes the worries shared by many scientists about finding the money to build their laboratories, conduct their experiments, and pay their staff, done via applying for grants and receiving funding from the government or private institutions. Jahren includes anecdotes about traveling to an attraction called "Monkey Jungle" in Florida on a week-long student field trip, as well as the experience of attempting to drive from Georgia to California for a conference in less than a week, resulting in the crashing of a university van. After running out of funding at Georgia Tech, she accepts a position at Johns Hopkins University and secures a job for Bill as well.

Part Three, "Flowers and Fruit", describes Jahren's life while building her second and third laboratories, marrying her husband, and having a son. She leaves Johns Hopkins after the birth of her son, due in part to an incident that occurred with a supervisor when she was banned from entering her laboratory while pregnant. After leaving Johns Hopkins, she and her family (including Bill) move to Hawaii, where she and Bill establish a laboratory at the University of Hawai'i at Mānoa, where Jahren was a tenured professor.

In addition to relating her life's work, Jahren touches on larger themes in the scientific community, including the current problems with securing funding, the over-saturation of the market with scientists, and the sexism that female scientists face in the field. She also briefly relates her struggles with her own mental health, although it is unclear within the text whether this takes the form of anxiety, depression or bipolar disorder.

== Reception ==
Reviews were generally positive. The New York Times wrote that Jahren had "the precision of a poet and the imagination of a scientist" quoting from Vladimir Nabokov, and went on to describe the book as "engrossing" and "thrilling", going on to say that Jahren "does for botany what Oliver Sacks's essays did for neurology, what Stephen Jay Gould's writings did for paleontology".

The Guardian wrote, "Jahren writes: 'Love and learning are similar, in that they can never be wasted'. And neither is time spent reading this book."

Popular Science wrote that Lab Girl was "A scientific memoir that’s beautifully human".
