= David G. Haskell =

British and American biologist and writer

David George Haskell
- Education: University of Oxford (BA); Cornell University (PhD)
- Occupations: Biologist; writer
- Notable work: The Forest Unseen
- Website: https://dghaskell.com/

David George Haskell is a British and American biologist and writer. He is a two-time Pulitzer Prize finalist in General Nonfiction. In addition to scientific papers, he has written essays, poems, op-eds, and the books The Forest Unseen (Viking Press, Penguin Random House 2012), The Songs of Trees (Viking Press, Penguin Random House 2017), Thirteen Ways to Smell a Tree (Hachette 2021), and Sounds Wild and Broken (Viking Press, Penguin Random House 2022). In 2026, Viking Press published How Flowers Made Our World: The Story of Nature's Revolutionaries.

== Education and academic appointments ==
Haskell received his B.A. in zoology from the University of Oxford and his Ph.D. in evolutionary biology from Cornell University. His primary and secondary education were at l'École Active Bilingue (now named École Jeannine Manuel), Paris, and the British School of Paris, France.

In 2025, he was appointed Adjunct Professor in the Department of Environmental Sciences at Emory University in Atlanta, Georgia. He was professor at The University of the South from 1995 to 2025, serving as Chair of Biology (2004–2009) and Director of Environmental Arts and Humanities (2024–2025), William R. Kenan, Jr. Professor of Biology and Environmental Studies (2021–2025), and Professor Emeritus of Biology (2025 onward). In 2020–2021, he was Professor Adjunct in the Department of Ecology & Evolutionary Biology at the University of Colorado, Boulder.

== Work ==
The Forest Unseen: A Year's Watch in Nature was winner of the 2013 National Academies Communication Award for Best Book, finalist for the 2013 Pulitzer Prize in General Nonfiction, runner-up for the 2013 PEN/E. O. Wilson Literary Science Writing Award, winner of the 2012 National Outdoor Book Award for Natural History Literature, and the 2013 Reed Environmental Writing Award. Biologist E. O. Wilson wrote that the book was "…a new genre of nature writing, located between science and poetry". Outside Magazine listed the book among those that "shaped the decade", stating that it "injects much-needed vibrancy into the stuffy world of nature writing". The Forest Unseen has been translated into twelve languages and was winner, in translation, of the 2016 Dapeng Nature Book Award in China.

The Songs of Trees: Stories from Nature's Great Connectors, was published in April 2017 by Viking. It won the 2018 John Burroughs Medal for Distinguished Natural History Writing and the Iris Books Award. Jurors for the Iris Award called The Songs of Trees "a compelling example of poetic science" that "beautifully illustrates the interconnections … of particular trees around the world, weaving together scientific knowledge about them and their relationships to the rest of the natural world including humans." Public Radio International's Science Friday named The Songs of Trees of the Best Science Books of 2017, Maria Popova included the book in Brain Pickings Favorite Science Books of 2017, writing that Haskell is "the rare kind of scientist Rachel Carson was when long ago she pioneered a new cultural aesthetic of poetic prose about science", and Forbes.com named the book one of 10 Best Environment, Climate Science and Conservation Books of 2017. The Songs of Trees has been translated into fourteen languages.

Sounds Wild and Broken (Viking, 2022) was a finalist for the Pulitzer Prize in General Nonfiction. It was also a Finalist for the 2023 PEN/ E. O. Wilson Literary Science Writing Award and an Editor's Choice and a Recommended Paperback in the New York Times book review. Cynthia Barnett reviewing in The New York Times, wrote of the book that it "affirms Haskell as a laureate for the earth". The Acoustical Society of America awarded the book its 2021-2 Science Communication Award, Long Form Print.

Thirteen Ways to Smell a Tree was described by Sir Peter Crane, FRS, as "'eclectic, brilliant and beautifully written" and by Kate Humble in The Radio Times Best Books of 2021 as "My favourite book of the year".

In The New York Times Book Review, author Adam Nicolson said of How Flowers Made Our World, "A work of real passion… You feel like cheering. More Haskells, please, and more flowers". Christoph Irmscher wrote of the book in The Wall Street Journal, "exuberant prose engages all our senses, beckoning us, the way a flower would a curious bee, into a world of hidden wonders."

Journalist Paul Kvinta's profile of Haskell in Outside magazine was included in the 2018 anthology Best American Science and Nature Writing, edited by Sam Kean.

He served on the jury for the 2026 Pulitzer Prize in General Nonfiction, alongside Luis Alberto Urrea (chair), Marcia Chatelain, Andrea Elliott, and David Greenberg.

== Awards and honors ==
Awards for Writing:

- Award in Literature. American Academy of Arts and Letters. 2024. The citation states that he "brings to his work a wealth of knowledge and an insatiable curiosity...he expands the possibilities of language".
- Finalist, Pulitzer Prize for General Nonfiction. 2023.
- Finalist, PEN America/E. O. Wilson Literary Science Writing Award. 2023.
- Open Book Award, "Best Book in Translation", Taiwan. 2023.
- Acoustical Society of America's 2023 Science Communication Award, Long-Form Print category.
- Patricia Winn Award for Southern Literature. 2023.
- Winner (Gold and Listener’s Choice), Signal Awards for three categories: “Most Innovative Audio Experience,” “Best Editing,” and “Best Sound Design” (for “When the Earth Started to Sing” published with collaborators in Emergence Magazine). January 2023.
- Iris Book Award for outstanding writing in science, religion, and nature. 2020.
- Ping Shan Natural History Book Award, China. 2020.
- Social Impact Media Awards: Best VR Experience and Jury Prizes for Immersive Impact and Journalistic Achievement. For The Atomic Tree, directed by E. Vaughan-Lee and A. Loften, script D. Haskell, E. Vaughn-Lee, and A Loften. 2020.
- John Burroughs Medal for distinguished natural history writing. 2018.
- China Times Open Book Awards: The Best Book for Life. Taiwan. 2017.
- Dapeng Nature Writing Award. Shenzhen, China. 2016.
- John Simon Guggenheim Fellowship. 2014-2015.
- National Academies’ 2013 Communication Award for Best Book. (Given by the National Academy of Sciences, National Academy of Engineering, and Institute of Medicine, with support from the Keck Foundation.)
- Finalist for 2013 Pulitzer Prize for General Nonfiction.
- Winner of the 2013 Reed Environmental Writing Award.
- Winner of the 2012 National Outdoor Book Award for Natural History Literature.
- Runner-up for 2013 PEN America/E. O. Wilson Literary Science Writing Award.

Other awards:

In 2009 he was named the Carnegie-CASE Professor of the Year in Tennessee. He was awarded a Guggenheim Fellowship by the John Simon Guggenheim Memorial Foundation in 2014.

In 2022, Haskell was elected a fellow of the Linnean Society of London. He is also a fellow of the American Council of Learned Societies and elected member of the American Ornithological Society.

== Support of conservation and environmental justice organizations ==
In the Acknowledgments section of The Forest Unseen, Haskell writes that "I will donate at least half my author's proceeds to projects that benefit forest conservation". In the same section of Sounds Wild and Broken, he states "In these pages, I make the case that the acoustic crisis has four main pressing and intersecting dimensions...loss of ecological habitat and attacks on human rights...the nightmare of industrial sound in the oceans...the inequities of noise pollution in cities...failures to listen to and celebrate the storied sensory richness of our world. I will donate at lest half of my net proceeds from this book to organizations that work to heal and reverse these aggressions, fragmentations, and loses." He donated to education and conservation groups all of his proceeds from the sale of the best-selling Eastern Forest Playing Cards with the Art of Play.

Haskell served on advisory boards for the Open Space Institute and as board member and leader of the Shakerag Hollow Conservation Initiative for the South Cumberland Regional Land Trust. He serves on the advisory board of Advisory Board, MAX (Media Art Exploration).

== Works ==
=== Books ===
- The Forest Unseen: A Year's Watch in Nature, (Viking Books hardcover edition 2012, Penguin paperback edition 2013)
- The Songs of Trees: Stories from Nature's Great Connectors, (Viking Books hardcover edition 2017, Penguin paperback edition 2018)
- Thirteen Ways to Smell a Tree, published in UK only, (Hachette 2021)
- Sounds Wild and Broken, (Viking Books hardcover edition 2022, Penguin paperback edition 2023)
- How Flowers Made our World: The Story of Nature's Revolutionaries, (Viking Books, 2026)

=== Essays and Op-eds ===
- "Nature's Case for Same-Sex Marriage", The New York Times, 2013
- "Listening to the Thoughts of the Forest", Undark Magazine
- "The Seasons Aren't What They Used to Be", The New York Times, 2017
- "Central Park, Now More Delicious", The New York Times, 2018
- "The Most Wonderful Smelling Time of the Year", The New York Times, 2018
- "Love Letter to a Forest" BBC Radio 4, 2019
- "The Voices of Birds and the Language of Belonging", Emergence Magazine, 2019
- "Eleven Ways of Smelling a Tree", Emergence Magazine, 2020
- "The scent of trees: how to understand their language", The Financial Times, 2021
- "Humans Evolved to Play Music", Wired, 2022
- "Music, Forest, Body", Orion Magazine, 2022
- "Wild Sounds: The Loss of Sonic Diversity and Why It Matters", Yale Environment 360, 2022
- "The sonic wonders of our world are under threat. We need to listen", New Scientist
- "The Birds Are Singing, but Not for Me", The New York Times
- "Wildflower Beauty and the Search for Home", Emergence Magazine

=== Multimedia ===
- "The Atomic Tree", VR experience, 2019, Written by David G. Haskell, Adam Loften, and Emmanuel Vaughan-Lee, Directed and Produced by Adam Loften and Emmanuel Vaughan-Lee
- "The Voices of Birds and the Language of Belonging", Emergence Magazine, 2019
- "When the Earth started to sing", Emergence Magazine, 2022, Written and narrated by David George Haskell, Sound design and mixing by Matt Mikkelsen, Produced by Emmanuel Vaughan-Lee

=== Field recording albums ===
- Concurrent Dyscurrent. Where people and water meet. 2019
- Tress I. White Oak, American Beech. 2024
