= Nature via Nurture =

2003 book by Matt Ridley

Nature Via Nurture: Genes, Experience, and What Makes us Human
- Cover of the first edition
- Author: Matt Ridley
- Language: English
- Subject: Nature and nurture, human genetics
- Publisher: HarperCollins Publishers
- Publication date: 2003
- Publication place: United Kingdom
- Media type: Print (paperback)
- Pages: 326
- ISBN: 0-06-000678-1
- OCLC: 51553398
- Dewey Decimal: 155.7 21
- LC Class: QH438.5 .R535 2003

Nature Via Nurture: Genes, Experience, and What Makes us Human is a 2003 book by Matt Ridley, in which Ridley discusses the interaction between environment and genes and how they affect human development. It was the 2003 winner of the National Academies Communication Award for best creative work that helps the public understanding of topics in science, engineering or medicine.

== Reviews ==
- McKie, Robin (March 30, 2003). "You're mostly a monkey". The Guardian.

== Publication ==
- Matt Ridley (2003). Nature via Nurture. London: 4th Estate. ISBN 1-84115-745-7.
- Republished as The Agile Gene: How Nature Turns on Nurture (ISBN 0-06-000678-1).
