= Gareth Cook =

American journalist and editor

- Born: September 15, 1969 (age 57); Ann Arbor, Michigan, U.S.
- Occupation: Journalist
- Notable credit: 2005: Pulitzer Prize-winner
- Website: https://garethcook.net

Gareth G. Cook (born September 15, 1969) is an American journalist and book editor. He was awarded a Pulitzer Prize in 2005 for "explaining, with clarity and humanity, the complex scientific and ethical dimensions of stem cell research." He is the founder and Editor in Chief of the Verto Literary Group, "an editorial consulting studio that works with authors, agents, and publishers to bring important stories and ideas to life," and several of their projects have been New York Times bestsellers. Cook was a contributing writer for The New York Times Magazine, the series editor of The Best American Infographics and the editor of Mind Matters, Scientific American's neuroscience blog. His writing has appeared in The New York Times Magazine, The Boston Globe, Wired, and Scientific American.

== Career ==
Cook graduated from Brown University in 1991 with degrees in Mathematical Physics and International Relations. He was an assistant editor at Foreign Policy, a scholarly journal based in Washington, DC. He then worked as a reporter at U.S. News & World Report, and then as an editor at the Washington Monthly. He was the news editor of the alternative weekly The Boston Phoenix from 1996 to 1999. In 1999, he started at The Boston Globe, and worked for seven years as the paper's science reporter, covering a variety of topics, including biology, physics, paleontology, archeology, the role of women in science and scientific fraud. He was one of the founders of The Boston Globe's Ideas section, and then served as its editor from 2007 to 2011. He is now a freelance editor.

His stories have twice appeared in Best American Science and Nature Writing: "The Autism Advantage," from the New York Times Magazine, and “Untangling the Mystery of the Inca,” from Wired. He wrote a story arguing that Japan did not surrender at the end of World War II because of the atomic bomb.

== Awards ==
- Pulitzer Prize (2005)
- National Academies Communication Award (2005)
- Woods Hole Oceanographic Institution Ocean Science Journalism Award (2005)

== Personal life ==
He lives in Jamaica Plain, Mass., with his wife, Amanda, and his two sons, Aidan and Oliver. In 2003 he revealed that he is dyslexic.
