= The Butchering Art =

2017 book by Lindsey Fitzharris

- Author: Lindsey Fitzharris
- Subject: Nonfiction, history, medicine
- Set in: 1840s-1870s England
- Publisher: Farrar, Straus and Giroux
- Publication date: October 17, 2017
- Pages: 304
- Awards: 2018 PEN/E. O. Wilson Literary Science Writing Award
- ISBN: 9780374715489

The Butchering Art: Joseph Lister's Quest to Transform the Grisly World of Victorian Medicine is a 2017 historical nonfiction book by Lindsey Fitzharris that discusses the evolution of Victorian-era medicine between the 1840s and 1870s, along with how surgeon Joseph Lister revolutionized the practice of surgery to reduce the extremely high death rates of the time period. Published by Farrar, Straus and Giroux on October 17, 2017, the book includes graphic descriptions of operating theaters and the unclean conditions of hospitals and other facilities at the time. The book was given the 2018 PEN/E. O. Wilson Literary Science Writing Award and was shortlisted for both the 2018 Wellcome Book Prize and the 2018 Wolfson History Prize.

== Content ==
The book is split into a prologue, eleven chapters, and an epilogue. The prologue discusses a general overview of the time period as an "age of agony" that was nearing its end thanks to the emergence of Joseph Lister. Each subsequent chapter covers an ongoing history of Lister's life from childhood onward, with vignettes interspersed with other events and accounts of the medical profession during the time period. The coverage of Lister's life is largely based on Fitzharris' use of his personal letters and the account they give of his activities and thought processes.

The historical account's prologue starts in 1846 and the first surgical operation with any form of anesthetic by Robert Liston and how an unconscious patient significantly increased the ability for surgeons to complete their operations and have their patients survive. It then moves to Lister's childhood and his fascination with his father, Joseph Jackson Lister's, work in optics and the development of the microscope. Bringing his father's microscope to university and using it for microscopic examination of tissue, he created new ways to treat surgical wounds in the hopes of reducing post-surgical infections. Other scientists, such as Oliver Wendell Holmes Sr. and Ignaz Semmelweis, also made breakthroughs in understanding how microorganisms led to disease. Lister's discovery in 1864 of Louis Pasteur's work on the cause of putrefaction led to his eventual introduction of antiseptics through the use of carbolic acid sprays. His methodology was criticized by several others in the scientific community, but his 1871 successful treatment of Queen Victoria resulted in the widespread adoption of his antiseptic techniques, which he formally presented at the 1876 International Medical Congress.

== Critical reception ==
Reviewing for NPR, author Genevieve Valentine described the book as "equal parts a queasy outline of Victorian medicine and a quiet story of a life spent pushing for scientific progress" and, despite being a niche subject matter, suggested that there is "something that feels vital in a book about horrors everyone accepted as the costs of doing business, and the importance of persistence in seeing results". Jennifer Senior in the New York Times critiqued the book as being an "imperfect first effort, stronger at the beginning than at the end, and a bit workaday when it isn’t freaky". But she also noted that the story told within is "one of abiding fascination" because it involves a concept, doctors cutting open bodies with unclean tools and hands was harming their patients, that is so simple and straightforward that the idea it even had to be thought up is hard to conceive. Conducting a review for The Guardian, Wendy Moore wrote that despite the subject matter being a "reluctant hero" that might otherwise lend to a boring history, Fitzharris "skillfully negotiates this hazard by illuminating the characters and ideas of the time" alongside an "eye for morbid detail, visceral imagery and comic potential" that gives a deeper personality to Lister.

Reviews in History's Agnes Arnold-Forster saw the book in two lights. On one hand she considered the book a "compelling read" that "skillfully deploys narrative tension" from chapter to chapter, forming a work that would interest the general public and inform them about this period of history. But on a scholarly front, the book is often overblown in its descriptions of Lister and tends to "stray towards the sycophantic", with several of its claims about the medical community at the time and the adoption of germ-based ideas, which were already coming into vogue through the 1850s, being at odds with other modern research by Christopher Lawrence, Michael Brown, and Richard Dixey. Martin Edwards in the British Journal of General Practice wished that some pictures had been included for the grisly descriptions and pointed out that the uncritical history of Lister's life alongside implications of him pre-empting germ theory would be disagreeable to some historians. He nonetheless considered the book "fun, fascinating, easy to read, and assumes no prior historical knowledge" for readers that overall "deserves a place by the bedside of any clinician interested in a glorious pus-and- blood-filled romp".

Publishers Weekly selected The Butchering Art as one of its special picks and top 10 science books of the year, pointing out that Fitzharris' book "infuses her thoughtful and finely crafted examination of this revolution with the same sense of wonder and compassion Lister himself brought to his patients". For the Wall Street Journal, John J. Ross referred to the book as a "formidable achievement--a rousing tale told with brio" that successfully manages to restore "this neglected champion of evidence-based medicine to a central place in the history of medicine". Though he also notes that Fitzharris is "occasionally fuzzy on clinical matters", such as describing Hodgkin's lymphoma as rare, and that the book avoids mentioning any of the negative aspects about Lister, such as his sexism toward female medical students. Tilli Tansey in the journal Nature considered the book as "well researched and written with verve", along with being a "fine read full of vivid detail", though also explained how Fitzharris "takes some licence with speculative conversations, thoughts and emotions, and a few anachronisms irk". In Social History of Medicine, Anne Crowther was highly critical of the book, saying that it "follows Lister’s career well but is weaker on historical context, succumbing to popular history’s search for ‘colour’ at all costs", including generalizations of history that lead to inaccuracies and misinformation, including false quote attribution and statistical math. This, she added, along with how specialized hospitals and other medical workers are presented from the period as compared to Lister would leave readers with a "very old-fashioned view of the subject" that does not match up with modern scholarship.
