= AlterNet =

Left-leaning news website

- Website type: Progressive news website
- Owners: Alternet Media, Inc. John K. Byrne; Michael Rogers
- Creator: Independent Media Institute
- Editor: Roxanne Cooper
- Website: www.alternet.org
- Commercial: No
- Registration: Optional
- Launched: November 1987; 39 years ago
- Current status: Active

AlterNet is a left-leaning news website based in the United States. It was launched by the Independent Media Institute. In 2018, the website was acquired by owners of Raw Story.

== Coverage ==
Coverage is divided into several special sections related to progressive news and culture, including News & Politics, World, Economy, Civil Liberties, Immigration, Reproductive Justice, Economy, Environment, Animal Rights, Food, Water, Books, Media and Culture, Belief, Drugs, Personal Health, Sex and Relationships, Vision, and Investigations.

AlterNet publishes original content and also makes use of "alternative media", sourcing columns from Salon, Common Dreams, Consortiumnews, Truthdig, Truthout, TomDispatch, The Washington Spectator, Center for Public Integrity, Democracy Now!, Asia Times, New America Media and Mother Jones.

== Finances ==
Until April 2018, AlterNet was financed through individual donations, by grants from major donors, and ad revenue. In 2014, the top financial backers of the Independent Media Institute were Cloud Mountain Foundation, Craigslist Charitable Fund, Drug Policy Alliance, Madison Community Foundation, Nathan Cummings Foundation, New World Foundation, Panta Rhea Foundation, Park Foundation and Roseben Fund.

== History ==
=== Independent Media Institute ===
AlterNet was founded in the fall of 1987 by the Institute for Alternative Journalism (IAJ), which was incorporated in December 1983 with a mission to serve as a clearinghouse for important local stories generated by the members of the Association of Alternative Newsweeklies (AAN).

The founding editor of AlterNet was Alan Green, who with his deputy, Margaret Engle, created print and electronic mechanisms to syndicate both the works of AAN papers and freelance contributors, among them Michael Moore and Abbie Hoffman. Engle took over for Green in 1989 and ran the news service until 1993, in that time dramatically expanding AlterNet's base of contributors and client newspapers. Upon her resignation, Engle was succeeded by Don Hazen, who had been hired by IAJ in 1991 to be its first executive director. AlterNet publishes a combination of policy critiques, investigative reports and analysis, grassroots success stories, and personal narratives. Christine Triano was associate director of the Institute for Alternative Journalism, in 1996.

Media Heroes are annual awards by the Institute for Alternative Journalism. Frederick Clarkson was named among the "Media Heroes of 1992" James Danky was named a Media Hero in 1993. In 1995, Media Heroes awards went to Public Media Center, Fairness and Accuracy in Reporting, Institute for Global Communications, Janine Jackson, Laura Flanders, CounterSpin, Gary Delgado, David Barsamian, Alternative Radio, Haiti Truth Team, Salim Muwakkil, John Schwartz, and Artists for a Hate Free America were presented in MediaCulture Review, January/February 1995

In 1996, Leslie Savan was named one of "The Top Ten Media Heroes". Patricia Scott, and Julie Drizin were named to the "Top Ten Media Heroes of 1996" Paul Klite, Executive Director of Rocky Mountain Media Watch, received a Media Hero Award from the Institute for Alternative Journalism in 1996. Amy Goodman, Bob Herbert, Detroit Sunday Journal, Gary Webb, Herbert Schiller, James Ridgeway, Karl Grossman, Mumia Abu-Jamal, Norman Solomon, and Urvashi Vaid received the 1997 Media Hero Award. In 1997, Media Heroes awards were presented at the second Media & Democracy Congress. The Institute for Alternative Journalism named Barsamian one of its Top Ten Media Heroes.

The IAJ became the Independent Media Institute some time before December 1999. After the sale of AlterNet to the new company, AlterNet Media in April 2018, the Independent Media Institute (IMI) launched a series of new programs including the Make It Right Project.

=== Acquisition ===
On April 9, 2018, it was announced that AlterNet was acquired by owners of Raw Story, an online news organization, under the newly created company AlterNet Media. In an online statement, Raw Story founder John K. Byrne stated, "AlterNet will continue to carry content from the Independent Media Institute, its prior owner. Thus, much of the content you expect will remain the same. You will see articles by former AlterNet writers appearing with the Independent Media Institute byline." AlterNet Media later acquired the New Civil Rights Movement.

== Staff ==
=== Don Hazen ===
Don Hazen was hired by San Francisco's Institute for Alternative Journalism in 1991 as its first executive director. The AlterNet editorial staff was headed by executive editor Hazen, a former publisher of Mother Jones, until December 2017 when he was placed on indefinite leave by the Independent Media Institute's Board of Directors due to sexual harassment allegations. Following the allegations, Hazen resigned on 22 December 2017. An episode of the public radio program This American Life, "Five Women", recounts alleged sexual harassment in the workplace by Hazen.

== Awards and recognition ==
- Webby Awards
  - Nominated: 2002, 2004
  - Winner: 2003, 2005
  - Official Honoree (Politics section), 2008
- Utne Independent Press Awards
  - Nominated: 2004, 2005
  - Winner: 2002, 2003 (Reader's Choice)
- One of NPR's five "best on the internet", 2001

== Books ==
- Hazen, Don; Winokur, Julie, eds. (1997). We the Media: A Citizens' Guide to Fighting for Media Democracy. New York: The New Press. ISBN 978-1-56584-380-6. OCLC 807833771.
- Hazen, Don, ed. (2001). After 9/11: Solutions for a Saner World. San Francisco, Calif: AlterNet.org. ISBN 0-9633687-1-0. OCLC 894785867.
- Scheer, Christopher; Lakshmi Chaudhry and Robert Scheer (2003). The Five Biggest Lies Bush Told Us About Iraq. New York: Seven Stories and Akashic Books. ISBN 1-58322-644-3. OCLC 56044650.
- Hazen, Don; and Lakshmi Chaudhry (2005). Start Making Sense: Turning the Lessons of Election 2004 into Winning Progressive Politics. White River Junction, Vt.: Chelsea Green Pub. Co. ISBN 978-1-931498-84-5. OCLC 835761618.

== See also ==
- The Grayzone
- Double Down News
- The Intercept
