= Vagina Obscura =

2022 book by Rachel E. Gross

Vagina Obscura: An Anatomical Voyage
- First edition
- Author: Rachel E. Gross
- Illustrator: Armando Veve
- Genre: Non-fiction
- Published: 2022
- Publisher: W. W. Norton & Company
- Pages: 352
- ISBN: 978-1-324-00631-2

Vagina Obscura: An Anatomical Voyage is a 2022 non-fiction book written by science journalist Rachel E. Gross and illustrated by Armando Veve.

== Summary ==
Vagina Obscura uses cultural historical and medical approaches to explore female anatomy. Gross' historical account begins in ancient Greece with Hippocrates. Gross also includes personal experience in her book, writing about endometriosis and having a bacterial infection in her vagina.

== Development ==
Gross initially titled the book Lady Anatomy.

== Reception ==
The book was shortlisted for the 2023 Andrew Carnegie Medal for Excellence in Nonfiction. It was also a finalist for the PEN/E. O. Wilson Literary Science Writing Award and a New York Times Editors’ Choice selection.
