= All in Her Head =

2024 non-fiction book by Elizabeth Comen

- 2024 USA hardback cover
- Author: Elizabeth Comen
- Publisher: Harper Wave
- Publication date: 2024
- ISBN: 9780063293014

All in Her Head: The Truth and Lies Early Medicine Taught Us About Women's Bodies and Why It Matters Today is a 2024 non-fiction book by American oncologist Elizabeth Comen.

Comen considers the history of women's medical treatment, working systematically through the eleven systems of the body studied by doctors today. Elle magazine featured an extract from the section on the integumentary system: the skin. Elizabeth Lesser has said that it "exposes the shocking, infuriating, and heartbreaking medical myths and practices that have haunted the care and treatment of women for millennia—myths about the inherent inferiority and weakness of the female body that are still with us today." The reviewer for Publishers Weekly found it "Meticulously researched and conveyed in lucid prose", adding that it "fascinates and outrages in equal measure"

It was a finalist for the 2025 PEN/E. O. Wilson Literary Science Writing Award, and a USA Today bestseller. The New York Post included it in "The 15 best books we read in February 2024", and Amazon's editorial director listed it in her five recommendations for Women's History Month.

Comen is a breast cancer oncologist at NYU Langone Health, having previously held positions at Memorial Sloan Kettering Cancer Center and as assistant professor of medicine at Weill Cornell Medicine.
