= The Forest Unseen =

Book by David G. Haskell

- First edition
- Author: David G. Haskell
- Language: English
- Subject: Ecology
- Publisher: Viking Books
- Publication date: 2012
- Publication place: United States
- Media type: Print (Hardcover and Paperback) and e-book
- Pages: 288
- ISBN: 978-0-14-312294-4

The Forest Unseen: A Year's Watch in Nature is a 2012 book written by David G. Haskell.

== Summary ==
The book is divided in 43 short chapters ordered by date and roughly covering a whole year. In each of them the author, which visits almost every day a single square meter randomly chosen of an old-growth forest of Cumberland Plateau (Tennessee), describes what happens to plants, animals and insects living there. These observations give him the opportunity to write not only about the small-scale forest ecology but also on worldwide natural processes. He often calls his small observation field mandala, inspired by the paintings of sand created by Tibetan as a support for meditation.

== Awards ==
- Winner of the 2012 National Outdoor Book Award for Natural History Literature
- Winner of the 2013 Reed Environmental Writing Award.
- Winner of the 2013 National Academies Communication Award for Best Book.
- Finalist for the 2013 Pulitzer Prize in General Nonfiction.
- Winner of the 2016 Dapeng Nature Book Award (China).

== Translations ==
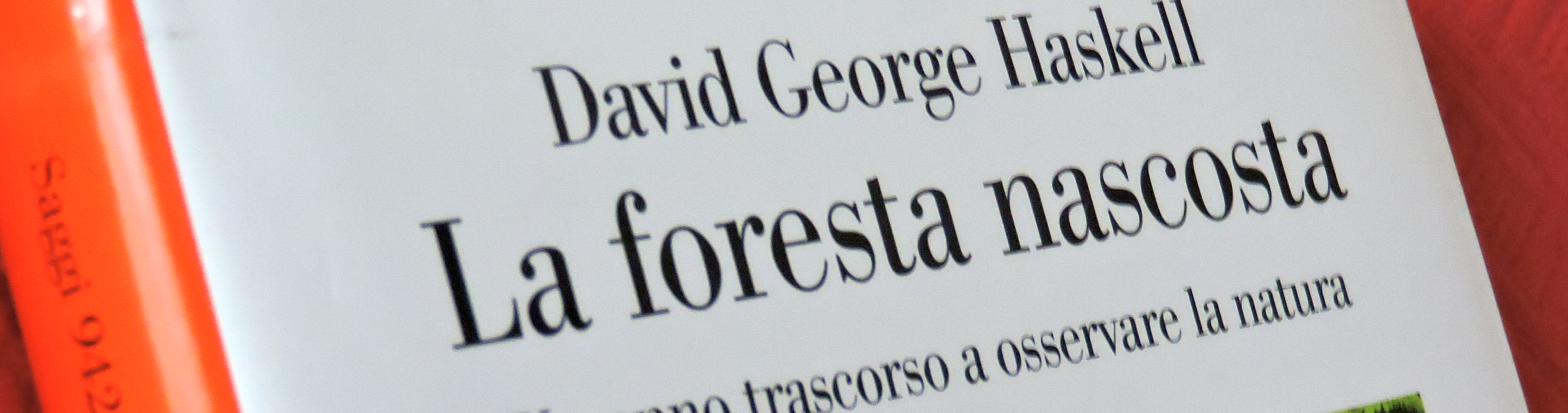
2014 Italian edition by Einaudi

As far as late 2017 The Forest Unseen has been translated into ten languages.
