= Michael Rogers (publisher) =

American blogger and activist

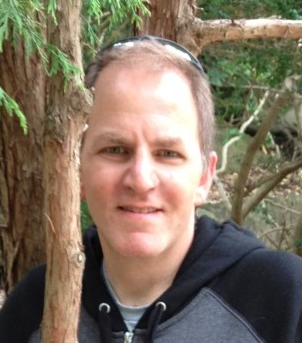
- Rogers in March, 2012.
- Born: November 12, 1963 (age 62); Suffern, New York, U.S.
- Education: University of Buffalo
- Occupations: Media executive, journalist, fundraiser, blogger and gay rights activist.

Michael Rogers (born November 12, 1963) is an American media executive, journalist, fundraiser, blogger and gay rights activist. He is partner and vice chairman of Raw Story Media, Inc., co-owner of Alternet Media, and founder and Director of Netroots Connect. He is also known for his work in reporting on closeted gay politicians who are anti-gay. He was the subject of the 2009 American HBO documentary film Outrage.

== History and education ==
Rogers was born to a Jewish family, in Rockland County, NY (suburban to New York City), and attended public schools. Rogers attended Ramapo Senior High School in Spring Valley, NY. He attended Adelphi University (1982) and the University of Buffalo (also known as the State University of New York at Buffalo) (1983–1986), where he majored in political science.

In both 2008 and 2022, Rogers was named to the Out 100, Out Magazine's compilation of the year's most impactful and influential LGBTQ+ people.

== Fundraising ==
Rogers first fundraising job was Development Associate of WNED-TV. He was Development Coordinator for the Hetrick-Martin Institute and Harvey Milk High School and Director of Development at the National Gay and Lesbian Task Force (now the National LGBTQ Task Force). Rogers was Director of Marketing and Development of GALA Choruses and was Director of Donor Programs at the Funding Exchange. At Greenpeace USA, Rogers was Major Gifts Manager.

== Activism ==
After moving to New York City in 1989, Rogers joined the AIDS Coalition to Unleash Power (ACT UP!). He, along with fellow Hetrick-Martin Institute employee Ann Northrop, was arrested for participating in ACT UP's "Stop the Church" demonstration at St. Patrick's Cathedral in 1989.

In 2002 Rogers founded Stop The Box, his first internet activism effort. "The 'Box'," referred to a 20 ft. wide, 10 ft. height and 8 ft depth unattended structure that housed a prototype automatic convenience store. The Box was owned by TikTok Easy Shop company. Rogers created a website and organized resistance among residents living near the store. He coordinated protests and education campaigns against it. Rogers also discovered that the internet domain registration and the company were wholly owned by the McDonald's Corporation. Rogers had a letter published in The New York Times relating to the machine. The machine was removed within months of its installation.

In 2008 citizens of California approved Proposition 8, a voter initiative to repeal the state's marriage equality law. Under the law before the passage of Proposition 8, same sex couples were allowed to marry in the state. Because the initiative passed, marriage equality for gay and lesbian couples in the state was repealed. Following the election, Rogers learned that a Subway franchisee in Merced, California had donated $2,500 to the Yes on 8 campaign. Under threat of a boycott, Rogers made the following demands of Subway:

- Repudiate the gift
- Add sexual orientation and gender identity to the corporation's non-discrimination policy.
- Give an equal gift to the opposing side.

Subway agreed to the first two and Rogers dropped his demand for the equal gift when the original gift was rescinded. Subway's headquarters wrote to all locations (over 30,000) explaining how the gift was in violation of franchisee policies. The company also explained that the company's non-discrimination policies would now include sexual orientation and gender identity.

=== Blog ===
On July 7, 2004, Rogers launched BlogActive, a personal blog. The blog was a focal point for outing closeted gay politicians who actively opposed gay rights. His work was profiled twice by The Washington Post, including a 2007 profile which asked if Rogers was The Most Feared Man On [Capitol] Hill.

Rogers' first major outing report was on US Rep. Edward L. Schrock (R-VA). Rogers published a set of recordings of Schrock using the MegaMates/Mega Phone Line, a service for men to meet other men for the purposes of meeting for sexual encounters. On August 30, 2004, during the Republican National Convention, Schrock ended his reelection campaign.

One year prior to the publishing of emails from US Rep. Mark Foley to a 16-year-old seeking sexual encounters with the teenager, Rogers reported on Foley on March 4, 2005.

On October 17, 2006, Rogers reported on sexual liaisons between US Senator Larry Craig (R-ID) and unnamed individuals in Washington, DC's Union Station. Rogers uncovered a news story from 1982 that tied Craig to a sex and drug scandal in the US Congress. Rogers reported on more recent activity in various places throughout the nation. Rogers' report prompted Craig to issue a denial. Nine months later, on June 11, 2007, Craig was arrested in the Minneapolis-St. Paul International Airport for lewd conduct.

== Outrage ==
Rogers is the subject of the Magnolia Pictures/HBO film Outrage, a 2009 documentary by director Kirby Dick. The film focuses on closeted politicians and senior political staff who work against the LGBT community. Rogers's activities are followed and a number of his cases, including US Rep. Ed Schrock and US Senator Larry Craig, are central themes of the film. Rogers also served as a consultant to the filmmakers.

== Media ==
Rogers has been a guest on cable television news channels and his appearances include programs on CNN, MSNBC, Fox News Channel, and Current TV.

In 2004 Rogers appeared on The O'Reilly Factor with Bill O'Reilly. During his appearance Rogers challenged the talk show host because O'Reilly outed a member of the Massachusetts Supreme Court, while attacking Rogers' work. The exchange was reported in the Chicago Tribune.

Rogers has been profiled by GQ magazine, named one of Out magazine's Out 100 and was selected as one of Genre magazine's Men We Love. He has been profiled twice by The Washington Post, both times by writer Jose Antonio Vargas.

Rogers is a guest-host of the Michelangelo Signorile Show on Sirius XM Radio, and The Ed Schultz Show on SiriusXM and national terrestrial radio.
