= Hope Jahren =

American geologist (born 1969)

Anne Hope Jahren
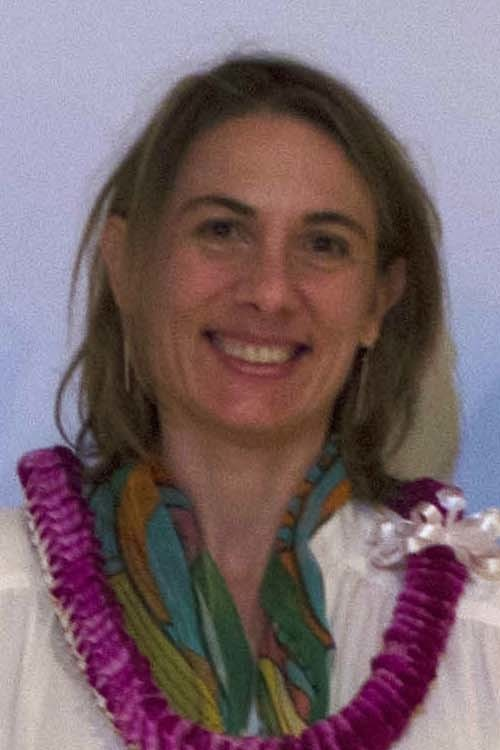
- Jahren in 2017
- Born: September 27, 1969 (age 57); Austin, Minnesota
- Education: University of Minnesota; University of California, Berkeley
- Awards: Fulbright Award (1992, 2003, 2010); James B. Macelwane Medal (2005)
- Scientific career
- Fields: Geochemistry, Geobiology, Stable isotopic analysis
- Workplaces: Georgia Institute of Technology; Johns Hopkins University; University of Hawaii; University of Oslo
- Thesis: The stable isotope composition of the hackberry (celtis) and its use as a paleoclimate indicator (1996)
- Doctoral advisor: Ronald G. Amundson
- Website: jahrenlab.com

External videos
- "The secret life of plants — and 'Lab Girl' author Hope Jahren", PBS NewsHour
- "Lab Girl by Hope Jahren", Knopf Doubleday

Anne Hope Jahren (born September 27, 1969) is an American geochemist and geobiologist at the University of Louisiana at Lafayette, known for her work using stable isotope analysis to analyze fossil forests dating to the Eocene. She has won many awards in the field, including the James B. Macelwane Medal of the American Geophysical Union.

Her book Lab Girl (2016) has been praised as both "a personal memoir and a paean to the natural world", a literary fusion of memoir and science writing, and "a compellingly earthy narrative".

== Early life and education ==
Jahren was born in Austin, Minnesota, on September 27, 1969. Her father taught science at a community college and she has three older brothers. She completed her undergraduate education in geology at the University of Minnesota, graduating cum laude in 1991.

== Career and research ==
Jahren earned her Ph.D. in 1996 at the University of California, Berkeley in the field of soil science. Her dissertation covered the formation of biominerals in plants and used novel stable isotope methods to examine the processes. From 1996 to 1999, she was an assistant professor at the Georgia Institute of Technology, then moved to Johns Hopkins University, where she stayed until 2008.

At Georgia Tech, she conducted research on paleoatmospheres using fossilized plants, and discovered the second methane hydrate release event that occurred 117 million years ago. She also spent a year on a Fulbright Award at the University of Copenhagen, learning DNA analysis techniques.

While at Johns Hopkins, Jahren received media attention for her work with the fossil forests of Axel Heiberg Island. Her studies of the trees allowed her to estimate the environmental conditions on the island 45 million years ago. She and her collaborators analyzed depletion of oxygen isotopes to determine the weather patterns there that allowed large Metasequoia forests to flourish during the Eocene. Her research at Johns Hopkins also included the first extraction and analysis of DNA found in paleosol and the first discovery of stable isotopes existing in a multicellular organism's DNA.

In 2008, Jahren left Johns Hopkins for a full professorship at the University of Hawaii. Her research there focused on using stable isotope analysis to determine characteristics of the environment on different timescales. On September 1, 2016, Jahren became the J. Tuzo Wilson Professor at the University of Oslo's Centre for Earth Evolution and Dynamics, where she studies how living and fossil organisms are chemically linked to the environment. She is now an Adjunct Professor at the University of Louisiana at Lafayette.

== Writing career ==
In addition to her research contributions, Jahren is also a writer. Her memoir "Lab Girl", published in 2016 gives perspectives on science and gender dynamics. Jahren discusses her experiences as a woman in the scientific field and reflects on the life lessons she learned during her childhood. The book encompasses topics such as gender dynamics in STEM fields, the challenges encountered by women scientists, and her personal and professional journey to success as a scientist and author. "Lab Girl" chronicles her life and career in science.

In 2020, Jahren published "The Story of More: How We Got to Climate Change and Where to Go from Here." The book grew out of her experience teaching courses on climate change.

== Honors and awards ==
Jahren has received three Fulbright Awards: in 1992 for geology work in Norway, in 2003 for environmental science work in Denmark, and in 2010 for arctic science work in Norway. In 2001, Jahren won the Donath Medal, awarded by the Geological Society of America. In 2005, she was awarded the Macelwane Medal, becoming the first woman and fourth scientist overall to win both the Macelwane Medal and the Donath Medal. Jahren was profiled by Popular Science magazine in 2006 as one of its "Brilliant 10" scientists. She was a 2013 Leopold Fellow at Stanford University's Stanford Woods Institute for the Environment. In 2016, Time Magazine named her one of the world's "100 Most Influential People." Jahren was awarded the Australian Society for Medical Research Medal for 2018. She was also elected to the Norwegian Academy of Science and Letters in 2018. In 2020, Jahren received the James Shea Award by the National Association of Geoscience Teachers.

== Support for science awareness ==
Jahren is an advocate for raising public awareness of science and has been working to lift the stereotype surrounding women and girls in science. One such example included the repurposing of the Twitter hashtag #ManicureMondays. Seventeen magazine originally came up with the hashtag, but focused mainly on manicured and painted fingernails. Subsequently, Jahren encouraged fellow scientists, specifically girls, to tweet pictures of their hands conducting scientific experiments. The idea behind this was to raise awareness of scientific research and to increase the profile of women working in science.

Jahren has also written compellingly about the sexual harassment of women in science. She recommends that people draw strong professional boundaries, and that they carefully document what occurs, beginning with the first occasion of harassment.

== Bibliography ==
- Folger, Tim & Jahren, Hope (October 3, 2017). The Best American Science And Nature Writing 2017. Boston: Mariner Books. ISBN 978-1-328-71551-7
- Jahren, Hope (2016). Lab Girl. New York Toronto: Knopf Publishing Group. ISBN 978-1-101-87493-6.
- Jahren, Hope (March 3, 2020). The Story of More: How We Got to Climate Change and Where to Go from Here. New York: Knopf Doubleday Publishing Group. ISBN 978-0-525-56338-9
- Jahren, Hope (2024). Adventures of Mary Jane. New York: Delacorte Press. ISBN 978-0-593-48411-1.
