= Outrage (2009 film) =

- Directed by: Kirby Dick
- Written by: Kirby Dick
- Produced by: Amy Ziering
- Cinematography: Thaddeus Wadleigh
- Edited by: Douglas Blush; Matthew Clarke
- Music by: Peter Golub
- Production company: Chain Camera Pictures
- Distributed by: Magnolia Pictures
- Release dates: April 24, 2009 (Tribeca Film Festival); May 8, 2009 (United States)
- Running time: 89 minutes
- Country: United States
- Language: English
- Box office: $287,198

Outrage is a 2009 American documentary film written and directed by Kirby Dick. The film presents a narrative discussing the hypocrisy of people purported in the documentary to be closeted gay or bisexual politicians who promote anti-gay legislation. It premiered at the 2009 Tribeca Film Festival before being released theatrically on May 8, 2009. It was nominated for a 2010 Emmy Award, and won Miami Gay and Lesbian Film Festival's jury award for best documentary. The documentary's prime subject was Michael Rogers, founder of BlogActive.com.

== Synopsis ==
=== Overview ===
Outrage argues that several American political figures have led closeted gay lives while supporting and endorsing legislation that is harmful to the gay community. The film examines the mass media's reluctance to discuss issues involving gay politicians despite many comparable news stories about heterosexual politicians and scandals. Outrage describes this behavior as a form of institutionalized homophobia that has resulted in a tacit policy of self-censorship when reporting on these issues. The film is based on the work of blogger Michael Rogers and his site blogactive.com.

=== Subjects ===
Among other subjects, the film includes:

- Larry Craig, former Republican politician and Senator from Idaho. In 2007, Craig was arrested at the Minneapolis–Saint Paul International Airport on suspicion of lewd conduct in a men's restroom, where he was accused of soliciting an undercover police officer for sexual activity. Craig pleaded guilty to the misdemeanor charge of disorderly conduct by signing and mailing a plea petition. He paid $575, including fines and fees.
- Ed Koch, Democratic Mayor of New York City from 1978 to 1989, was a lifelong bachelor, dogged by "endless gay rumors", who publicly denied being gay. Although his record on LGBT issues is generally positive, he is blamed for treating the emerging AIDS pandemic in the gay community reluctantly, unlike the health crises he handled in other situations. New York and San Francisco were the main epicenters of AIDS in the early 1980s. Critics, most notably Larry Kramer, believe Koch handled the AIDS crisis poorly because he was closeted.
- Ken Mehlman, the former Republican national chairman, was named in the film as a closeted homosexual though he was against policies friendly to gays. Mehlman publicly came out in 2010.
- Shepard Smith, former host at conservative news network Fox News. Smith publicly came out in 2017, saying he believed he was never in the closet.

== Interviews ==
People interviewed in Outrage include:

=== Openly gay politicians ===
- Tammy Baldwin, former Congresswoman of Wisconsin, now Senator
- Barney Frank, former Congressman from Massachusetts
- David Catania, District of Columbia Council member
- Neil Giuliano, former mayor of Tempe, Arizona
- Jim Kolbe, former Congressman from Arizona
- James McGreevey, former governor of New Jersey

=== Others ===
- Wayne Barrett, investigative reporter and senior editor for the Village Voice
- Elizabeth Birch, former Executive Director of Human Rights Campaign
- Kirk Fordham, former chief of staff to US Congressman Mark Foley
- Patrick Guerriero, former Executive Director of Log Cabin Republicans
- Dan Gurley, former Field Director of Republican National Committee
- Jim Hormel, former US Ambassador to Luxembourg
- Larry Kramer, founder of AIDS Coalition to Unleash Power
- Tony Kushner, playwright of Angels in America
- Rodger McFarlane, former Executive Director of Gay Men's Health Crisis
- Kevin Naff, Editor at The Washington Blade
- Michael Rogers, founder of Blogactive
- Hilary Rosen, Democratic lobbyist
- Michelangelo Signorile, radio host
- Andrew Sullivan, columnist for The Atlantic
- Rich Tafel, former Executive Director of Log Cabin Republicans

== Awards and nominations ==
Year	Award	Organization	Category	Result
2009	Jury Award	Miami Gay and Lesbian Film Festival	Best Documentary	Won
2010	Emmy Award	National Academy of Television Arts and Sciences	Outstanding Investigative Journalism: Long Form	Nominated

== Reception ==
Film critics responded, for the most part, with positive reviews. Scott Foundas of The Village Voice praised Outrage for its "well-honed arguments, sound sourcing, and journalistic boldness", and the San Francisco Chronicle's Jonathan Curiel described it as "essential viewing". Variety's John Anderson wrote that the film "is operating from a position of righteous indignation, and that indignation is infectious", while criticizing the film's lack of evidence in making certain arguments. Critic Armond White disliked the film, calling it "no more serious than the spiteful gossipy clown Perez Hilton", and writing that the decision to only out conservatives "influences ideological separatism, encouraging the idea of elite gay privilege".

== Controversies ==
=== Naming ===
While some journalists named the political figures discussed in the film, other prominent news organizations, such as The Washington Post, CNN, and NPR, did not report names. Dick questioned this reluctance, saying, "The press often reports on things that are very painful to the subjects they are writing about. [Closeted gay politicians] are public officials; this is reporting on hypocrisy, and there is an obligation on the press to write about it."

=== NPR review ===
In a review for NPR, film critic Nathan Lee named Outrage's primary subjects. NPR altered Lee's review by removing these references. Lee responded in a comment on NPR's website:

I personally disagree with NPR's policy—there is no other area of 'privacy' that elicits such extreme tact. [I] also feel that it is a professional affront to my responsibility as a critic to discuss the content of a work of art, and an impingement of my First Amendment right to free speech and the press.

NPR deleted this comment as well. An NPR editor later explained these actions, noting that, "NPR has a long-held policy of trying to respect the privacy of public figures and of not airing or publishing rumors, allegations and reports about their private lives unless there is a compelling reason to do so." This statement drew immediate criticism, as NPR had previously speculated on the sexual orientation of public figures such as Adam Lambert and Queen Latifah. This led to questions about why closeted entertainers presented a "compelling reason" for reporting while closeted politicians did not.

=== GLAAD Media Awards ===
Outrage did not receive a nomination for the Gay & Lesbian Alliance Against Defamation's 21st GLAAD Media Awards. Some journalists wrote that this decision must have been a deliberate snub because Outrage had been one of 2009's most prominent LGBT films. GLAAD responded to the criticism by arguing that Outrage "doesn't promote awareness, understanding and respect for LGBT lives and thus does not fit the criteria for the GLAAD Media Awards". Dick said that he was troubled by GLAAD's apparent stance against reporting on closeted anti-gay politicians, noting that "by taking this position, GLAAD is playing into the same philosophy that has kept the closet in place in politics for decades and has caused so much damage".

== See also ==
- List of federal political sex scandals in the United States
- Outing
