= Dot Earth =

- Website type: Environmental blog
- Available in: English
- Owner: The New York Times
- Creator: Andrew Revkin
- Website: dotearth.blogs.nytimes.com
- Launched: October 25, 2007; 18 years ago
- Current status: Defunct

Dot Earth is a media piece environmental blog, by science writer Andrew Revkin, which ran from 2007 to 2016 for The New York Times. The blog's aim is to examine efforts to balance human affairs with the planet's limits.

Featuring videos, interviews and other types of information like environmental and climate change issues, including energy policy, conservation, biodiversity, and sustainability, Dot Earth was further described as "an interactive exploration of trends and ideas with readers and experts."

== History ==
Posted on October 25, 2007, Revkin's first entry on Dot Earth was on "Cutting Greenhouse Gases for Cash Prizes". In April 2010, "after 940 posts as a news blog", The New York Times moved Dot Earth to the "opinion side" of its online site. This decision accompanied Revkin's move from a fulltime position to that of a freelancer, with the move being done to make clear the line between the two categories. After 9 years and 2,810 posts, Revkin ended the blog on 5 December 2016, just before he began work as a senior reporter for ProPublica.

== Readership ==
According to a Pace University press release, an institution in which the blogger is associated, the blog is "read by millions of people in over 200 countries, from Brazil to China".

== Honours and awards ==
- Outside magazine, Top 10 Environmental Blogs (#4), 2011
