= Cynthia Barnett =

American journalist

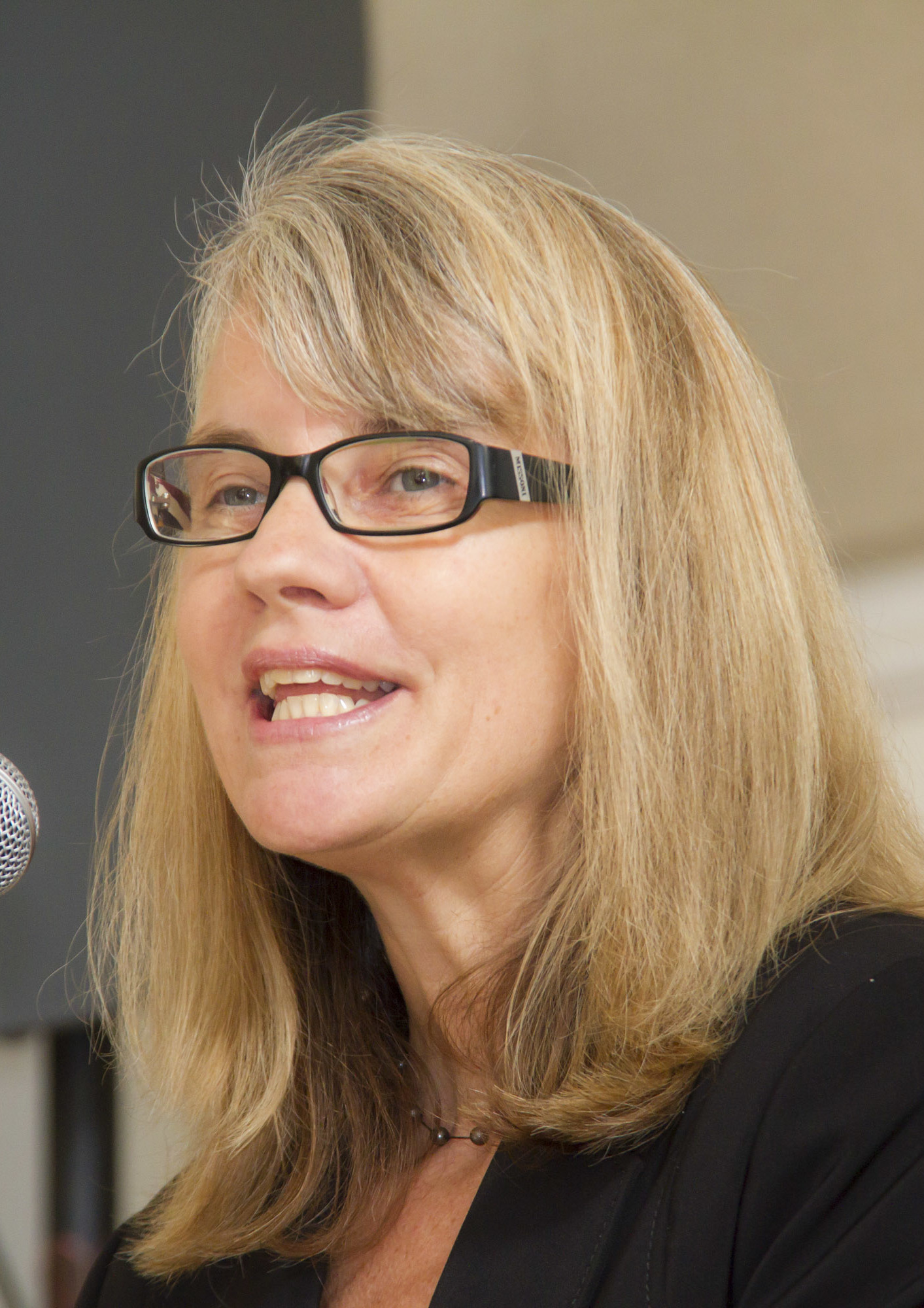
- Cynthia Barnett in 2011.
- Education: University of Florida
- Occupations: Author, journalist
- Website: CynthiaBarnett.net

Cynthia Barnett is an American journalist who specializes in the environment. She is the author of the water books Mirage (2007), Blue Revolution (2011), Rain (2015), which was longlisted for the National Book Award and a finalist for the 2016 PEN/E.O. Wilson Award for Literary Science Writing from the PEN America Center, and The Sound of the Sea: Seashells and the Fate of the Oceans (2021).

== Early life and education ==
Barnett was born in Fort Myers, Florida, and raised in Florida and California. She earned a bachelor's degree in journalism and a master's in American history with a specialization in environmental history, both from the University of Florida, and has described Florida's nature and weather as significant inspiration for her work. She spent 2004–2005 as a Knight-Wallace Fellow at the University of Michigan in Ann Arbor, Michigan researching freshwater scarcity.

== Career ==
Barnett spent twenty-five years as a reporter, columnist and editor at newspapers and magazines before giving up her full-time job in 2012 to devote her career to the environment and her books. Since then, she has written on water and climate change for National Geographic, The New York Times, Los Angeles Times, The Wall Street Journal, The Atlantic, Salon, Politico, Discover, Orion, Ensia, the Tampa Bay Times, and other publications.

Her first book, Mirage: Florida and the Vanishing Water of the Eastern U.S., published by the University of Michigan Press in 2007, foresaw the spread of U.S. water conflict to the relatively wet eastern half of the country. Mirage won the Gold medal for best nonfiction in the Florida Book Awards and was named by the Tampa Bay Times as one of the top 10 books that every Floridian should read. Her second book, Blue Revolution: Unmaking America's Water Crisis, published by Beacon Press in 2011, reported on water solutions from Australia to Singapore and articulated a water ethic for the United States. It also described a "water-industrial complex" that influences U.S. water policy toward twentieth century supply-side projects. Blue Revolution was named one of the best science books of 2011 by The Boston Globe. Writing in the Globe, author Anthony Doerr described Barnett's author persona as "part journalist, part mom, part historian and part optimist."

For her third book, Rain: A Natural and Cultural History, she set out to draw a broader audience with a popular topic, weather, and a lyrical approach to water and climate – "more poetry than pipelines," she says in her public lectures. Rain was published in 2015 by Crown, a division of Random House, and widely lauded for Barnett's nature writing and ability to translate science for a general audience. Rain was longlisted for the National Book Award, a finalist for the PEN/E.O. Wilson Award for Literary Science Writing, Gold medal winner for best general nonfiction in the Florida Book Awards, and named a best book of 2015 by NPR's Science Friday, The Boston Globe, the Tampa Bay Times, the Miami Herald and Kirkus Reviews.

Barnett is also Environmental Journalist in Residence at the University of Florida College of Journalism and Communications, where she teaches Environmental Journalism and Nature & Adventure Journalism. She is a critic of environmental communication targeted exclusively to conservation audiences and encourages students to reach "the Caring Middle." She first wrote about the Caring Middle in a commencement address to the Unity College class of 2012 in Unity, Maine.

== Bibliography ==
=== Books ===
- Mirage: Florida and the Vanishing Water of the Eastern U.S. Ann Arbor: University of Michigan Press. 2007. ISBN 978-0-47211-563-1.
- Blue Revolution: Unmaking America's Water Crisis. Boston: Beacon Press. 2011. ISBN 978-0-80700-317-6.
- Rain: A Natural and Cultural History. New York: Crown Publishing Group. 2015. ISBN 978-0-80413-709-6.
- The Sound of the Sea: Seashells and the Fate of the Oceans. New York: W. W. Norton & Company. 2021. ISBN 978-0-393-65144-7.

=== Interviews ===
- Cynthia Barnett (April 22, 2015). "Rain, Rain (Don't) Go Away." Interview with Tom Ashbrook, WBUR-FM.
- Cynthia Barnett (June 1, 2015). "Making 'Rain' for the Caring Middle." Interview in the Journal of the Society of Environmental Journalists.
- Cynthia Barnett (August 24, 2015). "Environment Writer Interviews: Cynthia Barnett." Interview with Sarah Boon, Watershed Moments.
- Cynthia Barnett (October 2, 2015). "A history as right as 'Rain.'" Interview with Collette Bancroft, Tampa Bay Times.
- Cynthia Barnett (January 28, 2016). "Rain's Complicated Cultural History." Interview with Michael Krasny, KQED San Francisco.
