= Andrew Revkin =

American journalist and author

Andrew C. Revkin
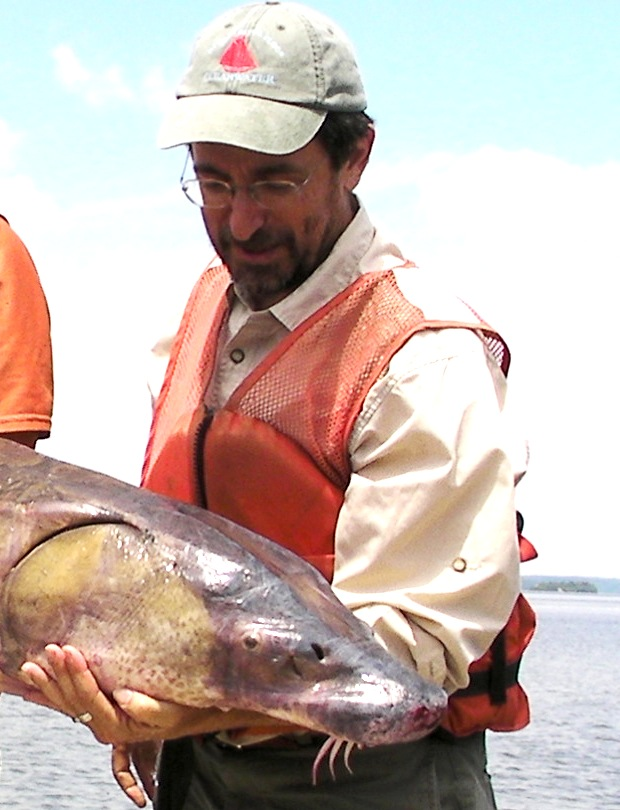
- Born: 1956 (age 69–70)
- Education: Brown University (BS); Columbia University (MA)
- Occupations: Environmental writer, professor
- Writing career
- Genre: Science writing
- Subject: Global warming
- Notable works: Dot Earth (blog); The Burning Season: The Murder of Chico Mendes and the Fight for the Amazon Rain Forest
- Notable awards: Guggenheim Fellowship; John Chancellor Award; Feinstone Environmental Award
- Website: dotearth.blogs.nytimes.com

Andrew C. Revkin (born 1956) is an American science and environmental journalist, webcaster, author and educator. He has written on a wide range of subjects including the destruction of the Amazon rainforest, the 2004 Asian tsunami, sustainable development, climate change, and the changing environment around the North Pole. From 2019 to 2023 he directed the Initiative on Communication and Sustainability at The Earth Institute of Columbia University. While at Columbia, he launched a video webcast, Sustain What, that seeks solutions to tangled environmental and societal challenges through dialogue. In 2023, the webcast integrated with his online newsletter of the same name.

Previously, he was a strategic adviser to environmental and science journalism at the National Geographic Society. Through 2017 he was senior reporter for climate change at the independent investigative newsroom ProPublica. He was a reporter for The New York Times from 1995 through 2009. In 2007, he created the Dot Earth environmental blog for The Times. The blog moved to the Opinion Pages in 2010 and ran through 2016. From 2010 to 2016 he was also the Senior Fellow for Environmental Understanding at Pace University. He is also a performing songwriter and was a frequent accompanist of Pete Seeger.

== Early life ==
Andrew Revkin was born and raised in Rhode Island. He graduated from Brown University in 1978 with a degree in biology. He later received a Master's in Journalism from the Columbia University Graduate School of Journalism.

== Career ==
Early in his career he held senior editor and senior writer positions at Discover magazine and Science Digest, respectively.

From 1995 through 2009, Revkin covered the environment for The New York Times. In 2003, he became the first Times reporter to file stories from the North Pole area and in 2005-6, he broke stories about the Bush administration's interference with scientific research, particularly at NASA.

In 2010, he joined Pace University's Academy for Applied Environmental Studies as Senior Fellow for Environmental Understanding.

Revkin has also written books on the Anthropocene, humanity's weather and climate learning journey, the once and future Arctic, the Amazon, and global warming. He was interviewed by Seed magazine about his book The North Pole Was Here, which was published in 2006. He stressed that "the hard thing to convey in print as journalists, and for society to absorb, is that this is truly a century-scale problem."

Revkin is among those credited with developing the idea that humans, through growing impacts on Earth's climate and other critical systems, are creating a distinct geological epoch, the Anthropocene. He was a member of the "Anthropocene" Working Group from 2010 to 2016. The group is charged by a branch of the International Commission on Stratigraphy with gauging evidence that a formal change in the Geologic Time Scale is justified.

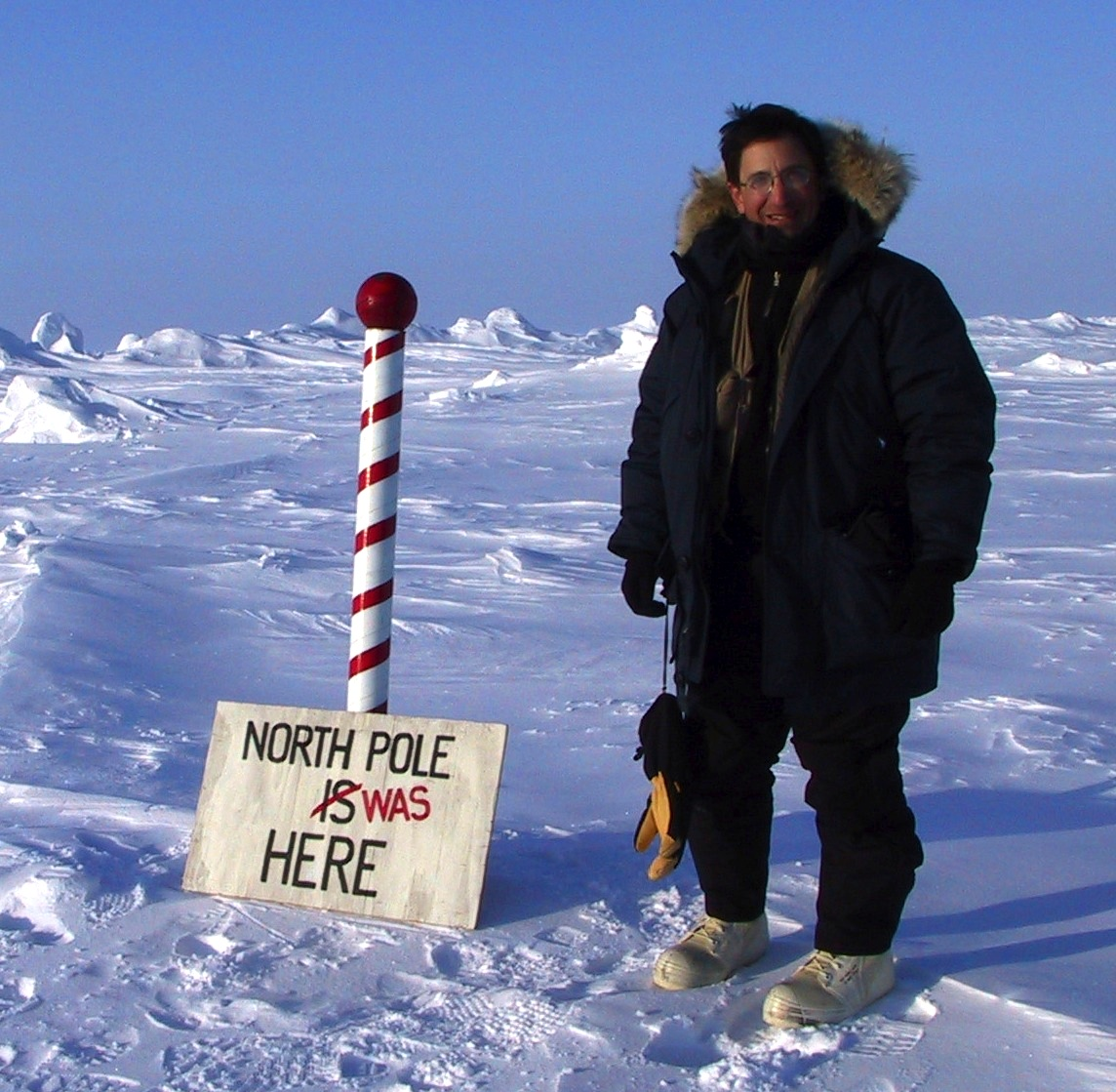
Andrew Revkin reported for The New York Times in 2003 from a research camp set up on sea ice drifting near the North Pole. Scientists erected the sign, then added "was" as currents were pushing the ice several miles a day.

== Books ==
- The Burning Season: The Murder of Chico Mendes and the Fight for the Amazon Rain Forest. Washington, DC: Island Press, 2004 [1990], ISBN 978-1-55963-089-4

-- translated and published also in Spanish, French, Italian, Dutch, German, Portuguese, Japanese and Thai editions

- Global Warming: Understanding the Forecast. New York: Abbeville Press, 1992, ISBN 978-1558593107
- The North Pole Was Here: Puzzles and Perils at the Top of the World. Boston: Kingfisher, 2006, ISBN 9780753459935
- Weather: An Illustrated History, from Cloud Atlases to Climate Change. New York: Sterling, 2018, ISBN 1454921404
- The Human Planet: Earth at the Dawn of the Anthropocene. New York: Abrams Books, 2020, ISBN 1419742779

=== Films based on his work ===
Two films have been based on Revkin's writing:

- The Burning Season (1994), a prize-winning HBO film starring Raul Julia and directed by John Frankenheimer, was based on Revkin's eponymous biography of Chico Mendes, the slain defender of the Amazon rain forest.
- Rock Star (2001), starring Mark Wahlberg and Jennifer Aniston, was based on "A Metal-Head Becomes a Metal-God. Heavy," a 1997 New York Times article by Revkin. The article described how a singer in a Judas Priest tribute band rose to replace his idol in the real band.

== Songwriter and musician ==
Revkin is a multi-instrumentalist and songwriter who led a Hudson Valley roots ensemble called Breakneck Ridge Revue. He was also a member of Uncle Wade, a blues-roots band. Revkin performed frequently with the folk singer (and environmentalist) Pete Seeger from 1996 until Seeger's death in 2014.

Revkin's first album, A Very Fine Line, featuring guest contributions by Dar Williams, Mike Marshall and Bruce Molsky, was released in November, 2013.

== Awards ==
- His book, The North Pole Was Here, was "A Junior Library Guild selection"
- Honorary doctorate, Pace University
- 1983 Investigative Reporters and Editors Award, for a magazine article "on the worldwide death toll from misuse of Paraquat"
- 2002 and 1986 American Association for the Advancement of Science (climate change, nuclear winter)
- 2003 National Academy of Sciences, National Academy of Engineering, and Institute of Medicine joint National Academies Communication Award
- 2006 John Simon Guggenheim Fellowship
- 2007 Honorary Sol Feinstone Environmental Award, SUNY-ESF, Syracuse, NY
- 2007-2008 Dr. Jean Mayer Global Citizenship Award, Tufts University
- 2008 John Chancellor Award, Columbia University
- 2011 National Academy of Sciences, National Academy of Engineering, and Institute of Medicine joint National Academies Communication Award
- 2015 American Geophysical Union, Robert C. Cowen Award for Sustained Achievement in Science Journalism
- 2021 Sigma Xi Honorary Member
- 2021 Lowell Thomas Travel Journalism Awards Gold award for travel books, The Human Planet: Earth at the Dawn of the Anthropocene, with George Steinmetz
