= Center for Fiction First Novel Prize =

American literary award

The Center for Fiction First Novel Prize is an annual award presented by the Center for Fiction, a non-profit organization in New York City, for the best debut novel. From 2006 to 2011, it was called the John Sargent, Sr. First Novel Prize in honor of John Turner Sargent, Sr. From 2011 to 2014, it was known as the Flaherty-Dunnan First Novel Prize, named for Center for Fiction board member Nancy Dunnan and her journalist father Ray W. Flaherty.

Publishers nominate English-language works by first-time United States novelists. There is a two-tiered selection process for the prize. First, the nominees are read by a network of booklovers (referred to as Common Readers), including librarians, writers, staff, members, and friends of The Center for Fiction, giving rise to a long list of recommended books. Next, the Common Readers' long list is forwarded to a committee of distinguished American writers, who select a short list, typically comprising five to seven titles, which is publicly announced in the late summer. All finalists are invited to read from their works at a First Novel Fête. The winning novel is announced at an awards event—both of these events usually occur in December. The winning novelist receives a cash prize of $10,000; each finalist receives $1,000.

== Recipients ==
First Novel Prize winners and nominees
Year	Author	Title	Result	Ref.
2006	Marisha Pessl	Special Topics in Calamity Physics	Winner	
2006	Marie Arana	Cellophane	Shortlist	
2006	Nell Freudenberger	The Dissident	Shortlist	
2006	Peter Orner	The Second Coming of Mavala Shikongo	Shortlist	
2006	Patrick Ryan	Send Me	Shortlist	
2007	Junot Díaz	The Brief Wondrous Life of Oscar Wao	Winner	
2007	Daniel Alarcón	Lost City Radio	Shortlist	
2007	Mischa Berlinski	Fieldwork	Shortlist	
2007	Jon Clinch	Finn	Shortlist	
2007	Nathan Englander	The Ministry of Special Cases	Shortlist	
2007	Austin Grossman	Soon I Will Be Invincible	Shortlist	
2007	Ehud Havazelet	Bearing the Body	Shortlist	
2008	Hannah Tinti	The Good Thief	Winner	
2008	Stefan Merrill Block	The Story of Forgetting	Shortlist	
2008	Rivka Galchen	Atmospheric Disturbances	Shortlist	
2008	Beth Helms	Dervishes	Shortlist	
2008	Peter Manseau	Songs for the Butcher's Daughter	Shortlist	
2008	Ed Park	Personal Days	Shortlist	
2008	David Wroblewski	The Story of Edgar Sawtelle	Shortlist	
2009	John Pipkin	Woodsburner	Winner	
2009	Paul Harding	Tinkers	Shortlist	
2009	Yiyun Li	The Vagrants	Shortlist	
2009	Philipp Meyer	American Rust	Shortlist	
2009	Patrick Somerville	The Cradle	Shortlist	
2010	Karl Marlantes	Matterhorn	Winner	
2010	Michelle Hoover	The Quickening	Shortlist	
2010	Jessica Francis Kane	The Report	Shortlist	
2010	Maaza Mengiste	Beneath the Lion's Gaze	Shortlist	
2010	Julie Orringer	The Invisible Bridge	Shortlist	
2010	Drew Perry	This Is Just Exactly Like You	Shortlist	
2010	Adam Ross	Mr. Peanut	Shortlist	
2011	Bonnie Nadzam	Lamb	Winner	
2011	Sarah Braunstein	The Sweet Relief of Missing Children	Shortlist	
2011	Carolyn Cooke	Daughters of the Revolution	Shortlist	
2011	Ida Hattemer-Higgins	The History of History	Shortlist	
2011	Ismet Prcic	Shards	Shortlist	
2011	David Vann	Caribou Island	Shortlist	
2011	Alexi Zentner	Touch	Shortlist	
2012	Ben Fountain	Billy Lynn's Long Halftime Walk	Winner	
2012	Patrick Flanery	Absolution	Shortlist	
2012	Tupelo Hassman	Girlchild	Shortlist	
2012	Peter Heller	The Dog Stars	Shortlist	
2012	Eowyn Ivey	The Snow Child	Shortlist	
2012	Kevin Powers	The Yellow Birds	Shortlist	
2012	Maggie Shipstead	Seating Arrangements	Shortlist	
2012	G. Willow Wilson	Alif the Unseen	Shortlist	
2013	Margaret Wrinkle	Wash	Winner	
2013	Lea Carpenter	Eleven Days	Shortlist	
2013	Marjorie Celona	Y	Shortlist	
2013	Christopher Hacker	The Morels	Shortlist	
2013	Mitchell S. Jackson	The Residue Years	Shortlist	
2013	Anthony Marra	A Constellation of Vital Phenomena	Shortlist	
2013	Kirstin Scott	Motherlunge	Shortlist	
2013	Taiye Selasi	Ghana Must Go	Shortlist	
2014	Tiphanie Yanique	Land of Love and Drowning	Winner	
2014	Rene Denfeld	The Enchanted	Shortlist	
2014	Smith Henderson	Fourth of July Creek	Shortlist	
2014	Vanessa Manko	The Invention of Exile	Shortlist	
2014	Matthew Thomas	We Are Not Ourselves	Shortlist	
2014	Ted Thompson	The Land of Steady Habits	Shortlist	
2014	Josh Weil	The Great Glass Sea	Shortlist	
2015	Viet Thanh Nguyen	The Sympathizer	Winner	
2015	Angela Flournoy	The Turner House	Shortlist	
2015	Tanwi Nandini Islam	Bright Lines	Shortlist	
2015	Sophie McManus	The Unfortunates	Shortlist	
2015	Ben Metcalf	Against the Country	Shortlist	
2015	Chigozie Obioma	The Fishermen	Shortlist	
2015	Lori Ostlund	After the Parade	Shortlist	
2016	Kia Corthron	The Castle Cross the Magnet Carter	Winner	
2016	Emma Cline	The Girls	Shortlist	
2016	Nicole Dennis-Benn	Here Comes the Sun	Shortlist	
2016	Kaitlyn Greenidge	We Love You, Charlie Freeman	Shortlist	
2016	Garth Greenwell	What Belongs to You	Shortlist	
2016	Yaa Gyasi	Homegoing	Shortlist	
2016	Krys Lee	How I Became a North Korean	Shortlist	
2017	Julie Lekstrom Himes	Mikhail and Margarita	Winner	
2017	Bethany Ball	What to Do About the Solomons	Shortlist	
2017	Jaroslav Kalfař	Spaceman of Bohemia	Shortlist	
2017	Annabelle Kim	Tiger Pelt	Shortlist	
2017	Simeon Marsalis	As Lie Is to Grin	Shortlist	
2017	Susan Rivers	The Second Mrs. Hockaday	Shortlist	
2017	Kaitlin Solimine	Empire of Glass	Shortlist	
2018	Tommy Orange	There There	Winner	
2018	Jen Beagin	Pretend I'm Dead	Shortlist	
2018	Akwaeke Emezi	Freshwater	Shortlist	
2018	Lisa Halliday	Asymmetry	Shortlist	
2018	Tadzio Koelb	Trenton Makes	Shortlist	
2018	Jordy Rosenberg	Confessions of the Fox	Shortlist	
2018	Nafkote Tamirat	The Parking Lot Attendant	Shortlist	
2019	De'Shawn Charles Winslow	In West Mills	Winner	
2019	Chia-Chia Lin	The Unpassing	Shortlist	
2019	Julia Phillips	Disappearing Earth	Shortlist	
2019	Pitchaya Sudbanthad	Bangkok Wakes to Rain	Shortlist	
2019	Ocean Vuong	On Earth We're Briefly Gorgeous	Shortlist	
2019	Joe Wilkins	Fall Back Down When I Die	Shortlist	
2019	Lauren Wilkinson	American Spy	Shortlist	
2020	Raven Leilani	Luster	Winner	
2020	Amina Cain	Indelicacy	Shortlist	
2020	Maisy Card	These Ghosts Are Family	Shortlist	
2020	Hilary Leichter	Temporary	Shortlist	
2020	Corey Sobel	The Redshirt	Shortlist	
2020	Douglas Stuart	Shuggie Bain	Shortlist	
2020	C Pam Zhang	How Much of These Hills Is Gold	Shortlist	
2021	Kirstin Valdez Quade	The Five Wounds	Winner	
2021	Priyanka Champaneri	The City of Good Death	Shortlist	
2021	Linda Rui Feng	Swimming Back to Trout River	Shortlist	
2021	Honorée Fanonne Jeffers	The Love Songs of W.E.B. Du Bois	Shortlist	
2021	Violet Kupersmith	Build Your House Around My Body	Shortlist	
2021	Patricia Lockwood	No One Is Talking About This	Shortlist	
2021	Jackie Polzin	Brood	Shortlist	
2022	Noor Naga	If an Egyptian Cannot Speak English	Winner	
2022	Daphne Palasi Andreades	Brown Girls	Shortlist	
2022	Jessamine Chan	The School for Good Mothers	Shortlist	
2022	Isabel Kaplan	NSFW	Shortlist	
2022	Alyssa Songsiridej	Little Rabbit	Shortlist	
2022	Mecca Jamilah Sullivan	Big Girl	Shortlist	
2022	Vauhini Vara	The Immortal King Rao	Shortlist	
2023	Tyriek White	We Are a Haunting	Winner	
2023	Elizabeth Acevedo	Family Lore	Shortlist	
2023	Christine Byl	Lookout	Shortlist	
2023	Eskor David Johnson	Pay as You Go	Shortlist	
2023	Jamila Minnicks	Moonrise Over New Jessup	Shortlist	
2023	Tracey Rose Peyton	Night Wherever We Go	Shortlist	
2024	Joseph Earl Thomas	God Bless You, Otis Spunkmeyer	Winner	
2024	Rita Bullwinkel	Headshot	Shortlist	
2024	Ruthvika Rao	The Fertile Earth	Shortlist	
2024	Mai Sennaar	They Dream in Gold	Shortlist	
2024	Clare Sestanovich	Ask Me Again	Shortlist	
2024	Morgan Talty	Fire Exit	Shortlist	
2024	Ledia Xhoga	Misinterpretation	Shortlist	
2024	Esther Yi	Y/N	Shortlist	
2025	Darrell Kinsey	Natch	Winner	
2025	Rickey Fayne	The Devil Three Times	Shortlist	
2025	Justin Haynes	Ibis	Shortlist	
2025	Alejandro Heredia	Loca	Shortlist	
2025	Colwill Brown	We Pretty Pieces of Flesh	Shortlist	
2025	Mariam Rahmani	Liquid	Shortlist	
2025	Shubha Sunder	Optional Practical Training	Shortlist	
2026	Emeline Atwood	A Real Animal	Shortlist	
2026	Samantha Josephs	Carrying	Shortlist	
2026	T Kira Madden	Whidbey	Shortlist	
2026	Giada Scodellaro	Ruins, Child	Shortlist	
2026	Avigayl Sharp	Offscreen	Shortlist	
2026	Ankur Thakkar	Blow Yourself Up	Shortlist	
2026	Nafissa Thompson-Spires	The Four Wives and Five Deaths of Richard Milford	Shortlist	

== See also ==
- List of American literary awards
