= Domecq =

Domecq is a Spanish family name. It may refer to:

- Allied Domecq, a former British wine and spirits company
- Alcina Lubitch Domecq, a Jewish Guatemalan short story writer
- Álvaro Domecq y Díez, Spanish fighter pilot, bullfighting promoter and member of the Spanish sherry family
- Álvaro Domecq Romero, Spanish bullfighter and cattle breeder
- Borja Domecq Solís, Spanish businessman and breeder of fighting bulls
- Brianda Domecq, Spanish-Mexican novelist
- H. Bustos Domecq, a pseudonym used for several collaborative works by the Argentine writers Jorge Luis Borges and Adolfo Bioy Casares
- Jorge Domecq, Spanish diplomat
- Juan Domecq, Cuban basketball player
- Manuel Domecq García, Paraguayan-Argentine admiral and politician

== See also ==
- ARA Almirante Domecq Garcia (D23)
- Marquess of Casa Domecq
