= Fumarel =

Spanish clothing brand

Fumarel S.L.
- Company type: Sociedad limitada
- Industry: Retail
- Founded: 1987; 39 years ago
- Founders: Cosme Domecq y Gandarias; Gabriel Narváez y Gandarias
- Headquarters: Glorieta de Quevedo 8, Madrid; 28014, Spain
- Products: Clothing, accessories
- Website: www.fumarel.com

Fumarel (Spanish pronunciation: [fumaˈɾel]), is a Spanish clothing company, specialising in technical sportswear. It takes its name from the black tern (chlidonias niger), a small seabird known in Spanish as fumarel.

It was founded in 1987 by two cousins from distinguished families, with the aim of providing high-performance equipment for the outdoors while maintaining classic and timeless designs. As a brand dedicated to clothing for luxurious sports (i.e. skiing, hunting, polo, or sailing), Fumarel became strongly associated with the upper classes, and was commonly worn by the Spanish royal family. Bruno Gómez-Acebo, Infanta Pilar's second son, was one of its boardmembers.

In 2008, the firm filed for bankruptcy following a debt moratorium as a result of the Great Recession. Since 2017, Fumarel has been relaunched by the co-founder's son, Pedro Domecq.

== History ==
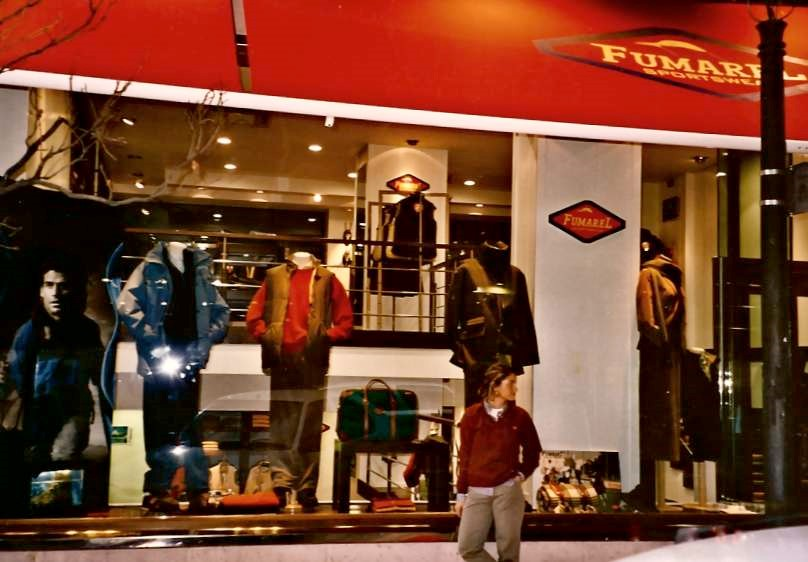
A Fumarel store in Madrid, 1999

Fumarel was founded in 1987 by two maternal first cousins, Cosme Domecq, son of the 3rd Marquess of Casa Domecq, and Gabriel Narváez, grandchild of the 3rd Marquess of Oquendo and a descendant of Ramón María Narváez, 1st Duke of Valencia. The latter would die in a car crash in Portugal in 1995, at the age of 29.

Since there weren't many brands specialising in a broad spectrum of luxurious sports, both aristocrats decided to produce high-end sporting equipment covering areas such as polo, horse-riding, golf, winter sports, hunting, sailing, and padel.

The brand became notorious after it supplied the clothing for the 1989 expedition to the Himalayas sponsored by Motorola and Banco Central Hispano. The firm grew in popularity and by 1999 it was the official purveyor of the national teams of padel, sailing, golf, and winter sports of Spain. The following year, it became the official sponsor of the Spanish Olympic Team at the 2000 Sydney Olympics.

By the start of the 21st century, the brand had 20 stores of its own in Spain, and expanded its presence to the United States in 2003, after it was popularised in the universities of Harvard, Yale, Princeton, Stanford, and South California. There were 3 official stores in Madrid, namely at the shopping malls of Santiago Bernabéu Stadium, La Moraleja, and Arturo Soria.

The brand is nowadays primarily sold online or through stands at sporting events, following the closure of its last boutique in 2011.

== Products ==
=== Apparel ===
Fumarel sells a range of clothing items, varying from men's and women's shirts, polos, jackets and accessories i.e. headgear or towels. The first Fumarel item of apparel was a polo shirt, designed in 1987.

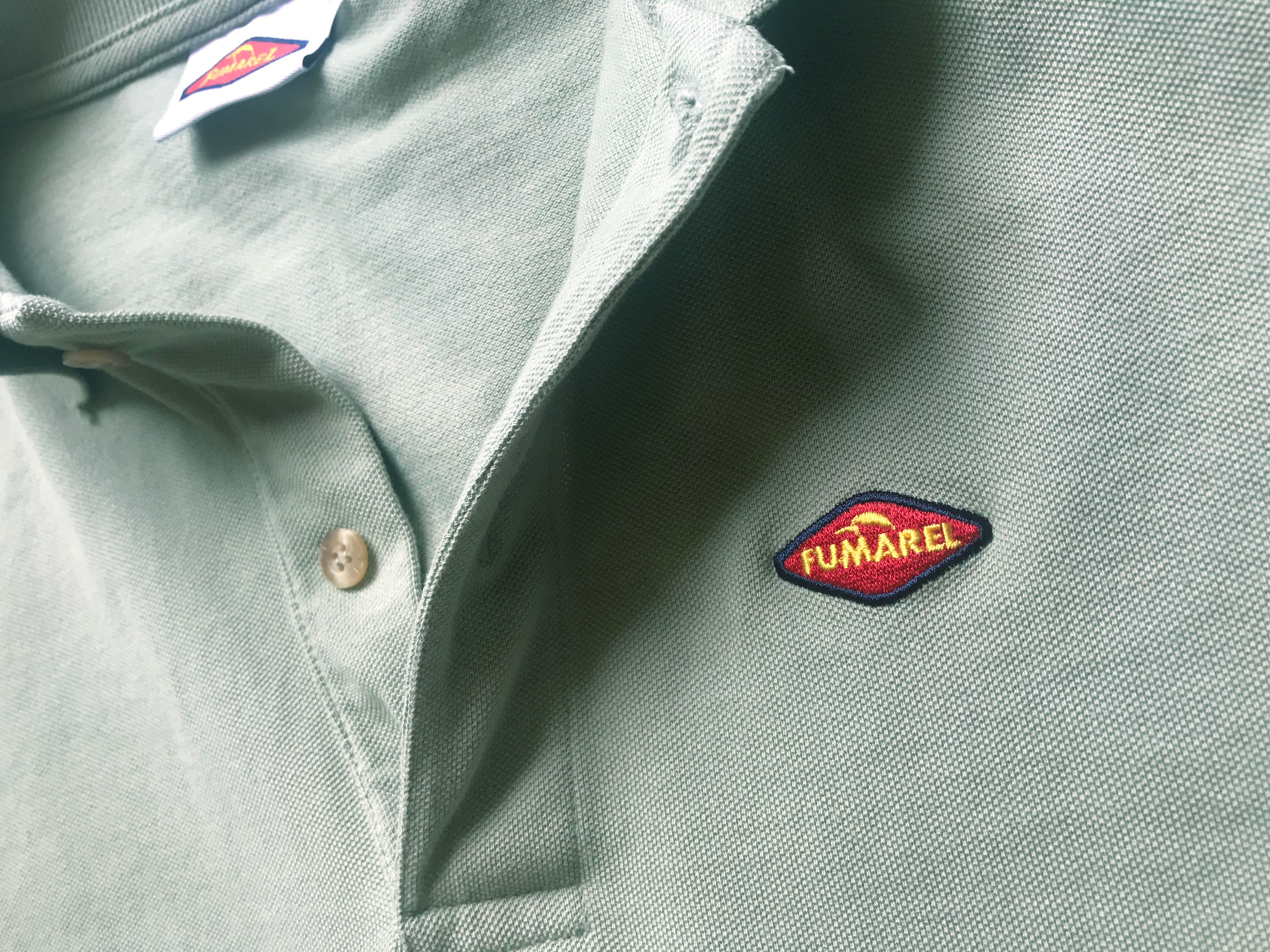
A Fumarel piqué polo shirt in jade. Introduced in 1987

In 2003, it cobranded the production of merchandising and apparel of the universities of Harvard, Yale, Princeton, Stanford and South California.

=== Sportswear ===
==== Polo ====
One of the main focuses of Fumarel has always been polo kits, and the associated equipment, having sponsored many polo clubs and competitions. The National team of Spain wore Fumarel until the mid 2000's.

==== Horse-riding ====
Fumarel was the official sponsor of the 2002 World Equestrian Games and produced equestrian garments but ceased to manufacture horse-riding equipment after insolvency.

==== Golf ====
Fumarel mainly produced gloves, tops and caps, although at one point it manufactured golf shoes as well.

==== Winter sports ====
The company was a pioneer in the Gore-Tex industry, and still produces coats and parkas. Fumarel developed its products mainly for skiing and snowboarding purposes, although it also catered mushing. In 2004, it sponsored the "Pirena" race, which consists in crossing the Pyrenees with a sled pulled by dogs.

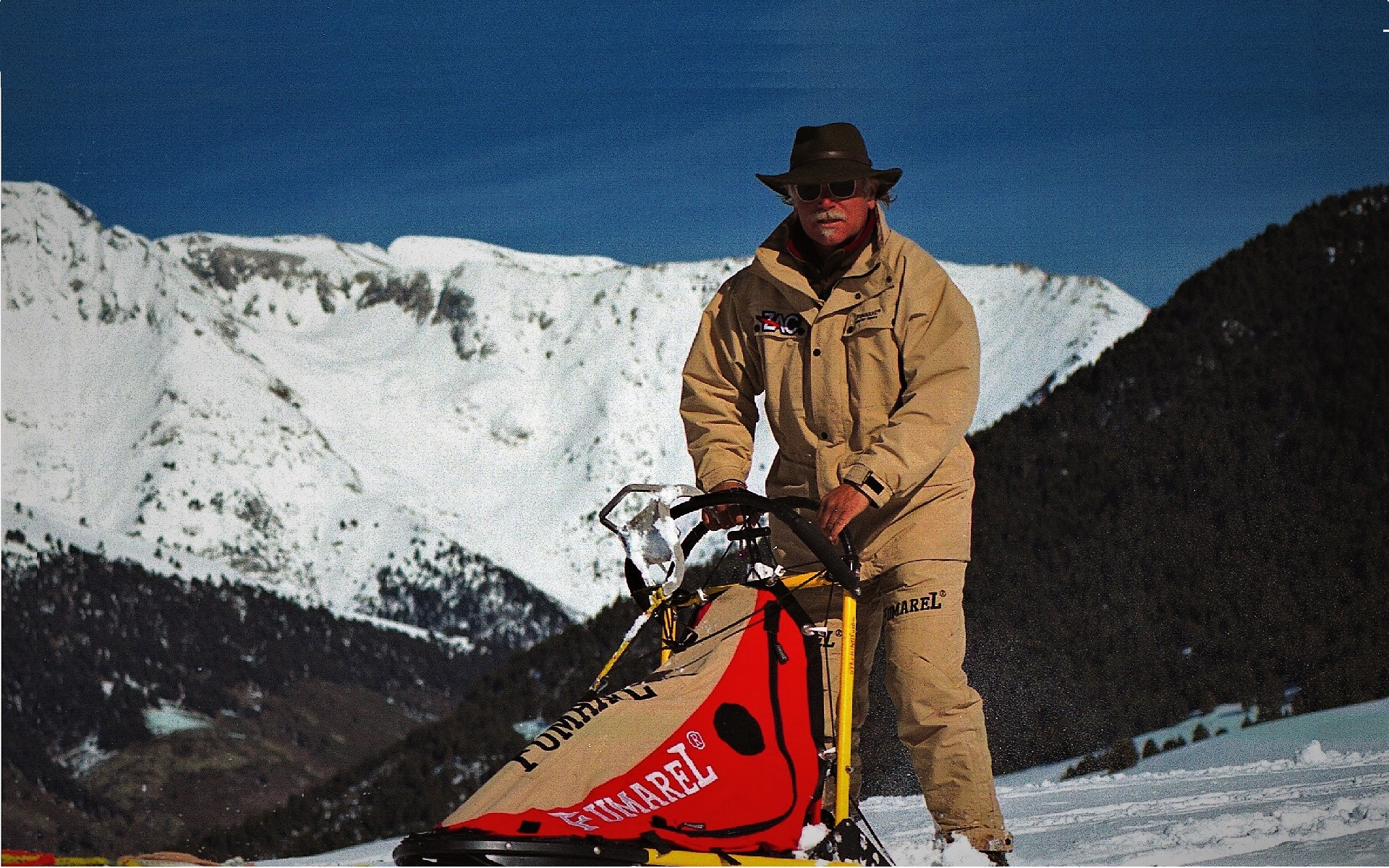
Mushing team sponsored by Fumarel in the Pyrenees, 2004

==== Sailing ====
Another of the strong areas of specialty was sailing equipment. It has sponsored the 2003 Women's Match Racing World Championship Invitational at Newport Yacht Club. The Banco Espírito Santo regatta team won a series of championships in 2002 equipped with Fumarel. These were the National Championship of Spain, the Tournament of H.M. The Queen and the Breitling Regatta.

==== Padel ====
Fumarel still continues to produce padel equipment, including racquets. It sponsored Spain's national team and association.

== See also ==
- Spain at the Olympics
