= Eleven Days =

Eleven Days or 11 Days may refer to:

- Eleven Days (novel), a 2013 novel by Lea Carpenter
- Eleven Days, an autobiographical account of a kidnapping by Brianda Domecq
- Eleven Days, a 1999 crime novel by Donald Harstad
- Eleven Days, a 2013 crime novel by Stav Sherez

== See also ==
- "Give us back our eleven days", claimed by some history books to be a demand made by rioters after Great Britain adopted the Gregorian calendar in 1752
- Eleven Days War (disambiguation)
