= The Good Thief =

The Good Thief may refer to:

- The Good Thief (Christianity), Saint Dismas, one of two thieves crucified alongside Jesus
- The Good Thief, an album by John Brannen
- The Good Thief (film), a 2002 film directed by Neil Jordan
  - The Good Thief (soundtrack), the soundtrack album from the film
- The Good Thief (novel), a 2008 novel by Hannah Tinti
- A Good Thief, a 2002 British television film
