= Michelle Hoover =

American writer and college instructor

- Born: Ames, Iowa, U.S.
- Education: University of Massachusetts Amherst (MFA)
- Occupations: Writer; college instructor

Michelle Hoover is an American writer and college instructor. She is the author of the novels The Quickening (2010) and Bottomland (2016).

== Biography ==
She was born in Ames, Iowa, but currently lives in Boston, Massachusetts. She was selected as the Philip Roth Writer-in-Residence at Bucknell University. She was a MacDowell Fellow from the MacDowell Colony. She has taught writing at Boston University and, since 2014, teaches at Brandeis University as the Fannie Hurst writer-in-residence. She also teaches at GrubStreet, where she co-founded the Novel Incubator program. She has an MFA from University of Massachusetts Amherst. In 2014 she was awarded a National Endowment of the Arts Individual Artist Fellowship.

== Works ==
Hoover is a contributor to the Best New American Voices anthology. She has also published short stories and novel excerpts in literary journals, including Prairie Schooner, Confrontation, StoryQuarterly, and The Massachusetts Review. In 2005 she won the PEN/New England Discovery Award for Fiction.

Her novel, The Quickening, was published in 2010 by Other Press (ISBN 978-1590513460). It was based on her own family history and a journal her grandmother, Melva Current, wrote during the Great Depression. It was shortlisted for the Center for Fiction's Flaherty-Dunnan First Novel Prize, was a finalist for the Indies Choice Debut in 2010, was a finalist in the Literary Fiction category for Foreword Magazine's 2010 Book of the Year Awards, and was a 2010 Massachusetts Book Award "Must Read" pick. Poets and Writers magazine picked The Quickening as one of its Top 5 Debut novels in 2010.

Her second novel, Bottomland (ISBN 978-0802124715), was published on March 1, 2016, by Grove Press, Black Cat. It was chosen as the 2017 All Iowa Reads selection.
