= Penitentes (New Mexico) =

Hispano Lay Confraternity

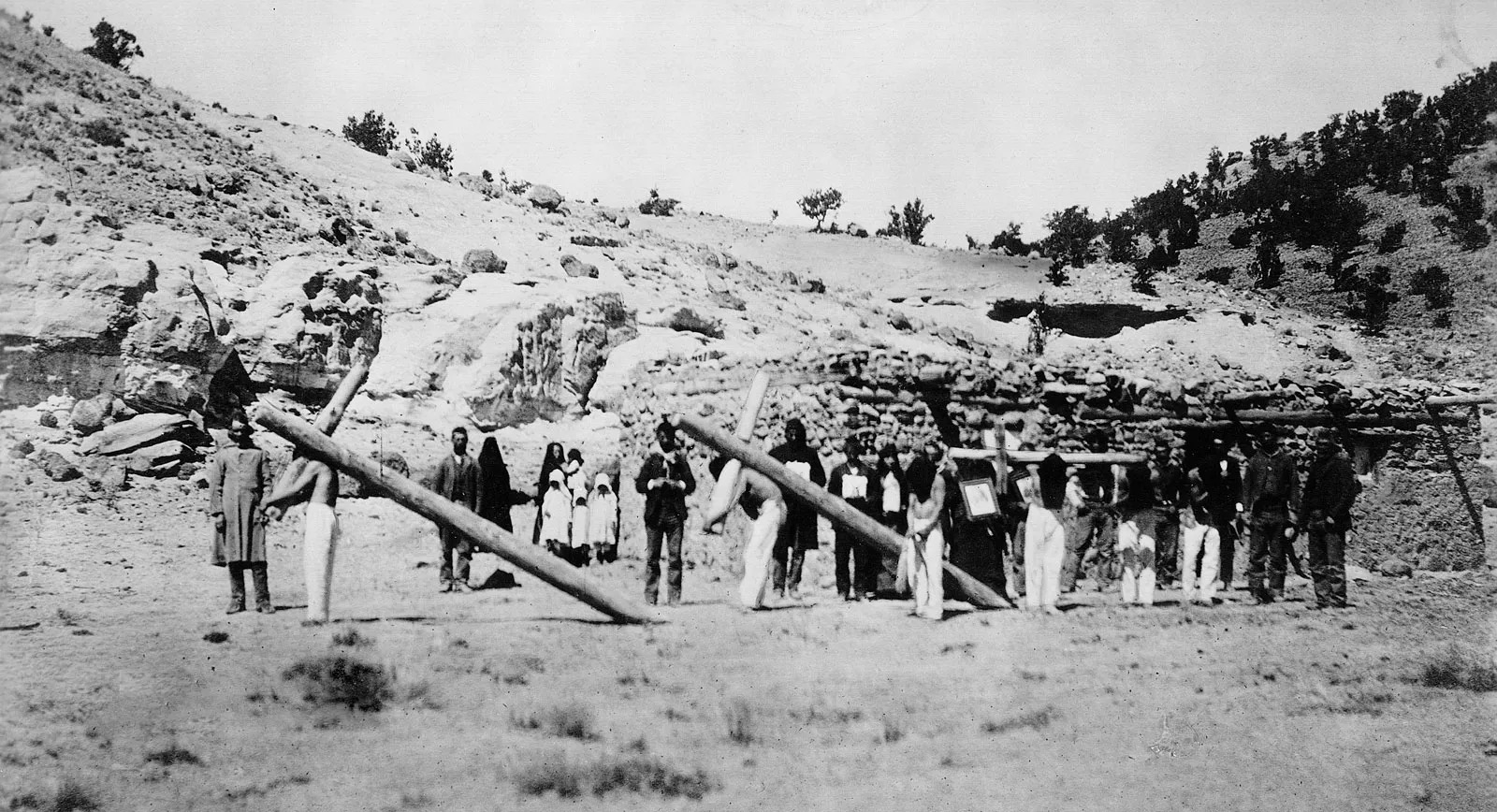
A Penitente Holy Week procession in 1888, photographed by Charles F. Lummis

Los Hermanos de la Fraternidad Piadosa de Nuestro Padre Jesús Nazareno (Spanish: 'The Brothers of the Pious Fraternity of Our Father Jesus the Nazarene'), also known as Los Penitentes, Los Hermanos, the Brotherhood of our Father Jesus of Nazareth and the Penitente Brotherhood, is a semi-secret lay confraternity of Hispano Catholic men active in Northern and Central New Mexico and southern Colorado. The confraternity's origins are not known, though most scholars agree that it arose in reaction to neglect of the region by religious authorities between the 18th and early 19th centuries. The Penitentes first became widely known during New Mexico's territorial period for their practice of physical penance during Holy Week, for which they were targeted by the institutional Catholic church and vilified in popular literature. Membership in the confraternity peaked in the late 19th century, but Penitente activities continue in the 21st century.

== Historiography and conjectured origins ==
The first known and explicit reference made to the Penitentes dates to 1833, when the newly-appointed Bishop of Durango José Antonio Laureano de Zubiría visited New Mexico (the first episcopal visit to the area in 73 years). In his writings from the visitation, he noted and condemned the activities of a "Brotherhood of Penitentes" which, in Zubiría's account, was founded illicitly in the years prior to his visit. Josiah Gregg's Commerce of the Praries (1849) notes a bloody Good Friday ceremony in Tomé, allegedly witnessed by the author more than a decade earlier. However, neither of these early accounts make categorical claims regarding the brotherhood's origins.

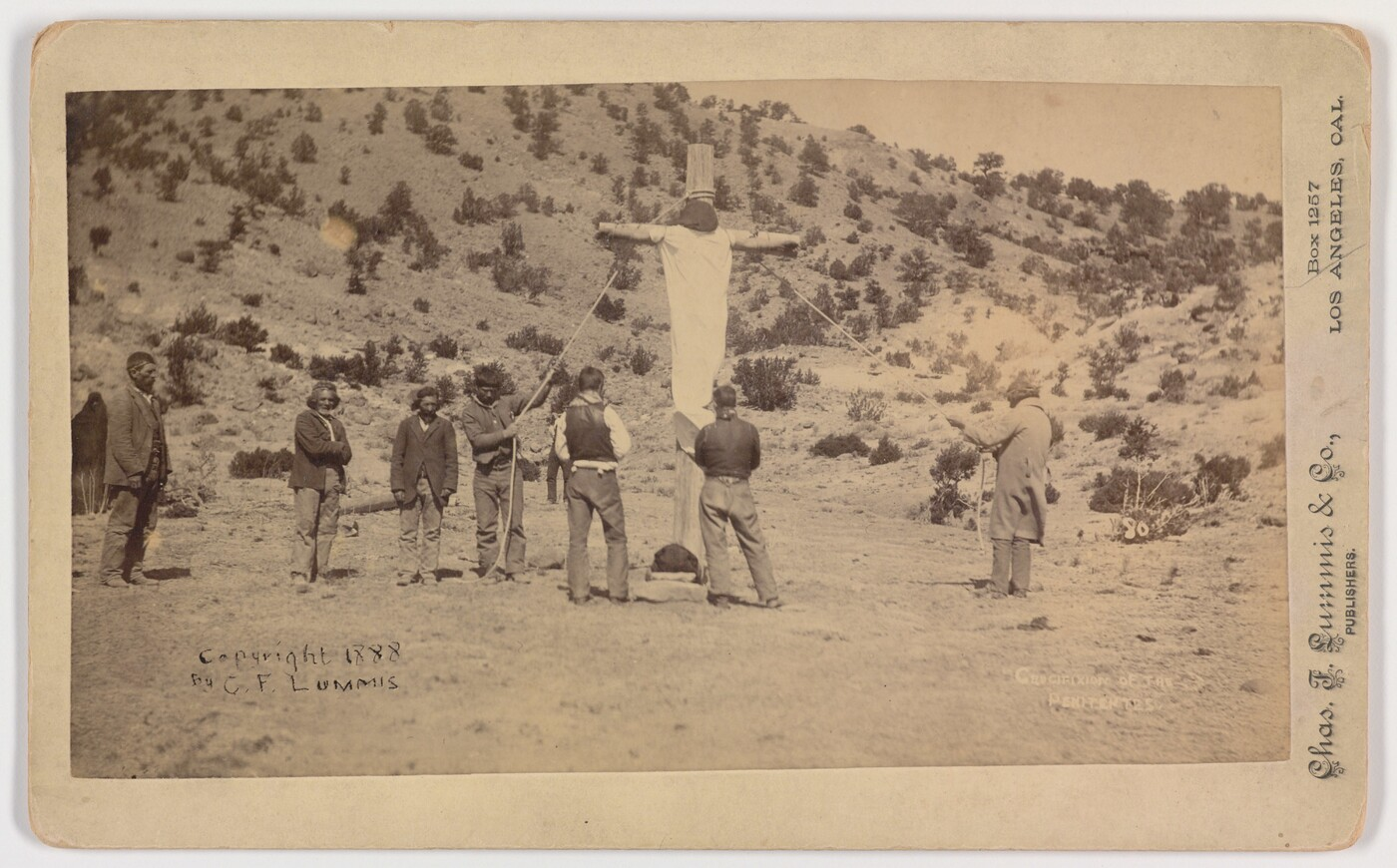
The photographs and writings of Charles F. Lummis, most notably this crucifixion scene, first exposed the American public to the Penitentes, whom he represented as barbaric, pagan, and criminal.

The United States acquired Mexico's northern territories, including the heartland of Penitente practice, after the end of the Mexican-American War. The Vicariate Apostolic (now Archdiocese) of Santa Fe was organized in 1850, prior to which the territory of Santa Fe de Nuevo Mexico was nominally administered by the Diocese of Durango. The new Vicariate Apostolic was headed by Bishop John Baptist Lamy, a French bishop until then laboring in Ohio, and was (excluding the preexisting Mexican clergy) staffed by Frenchmen. The Vicariate's elevation to a diocese in 1850 mostly settled jurisdictional questions, although they did not end disputes between Mexican and French clergy in the area.

Lamy and the new French clergy took quickly took note of the fact that almost every village in the new Diocese hosted a confraternity which, most notably, engaged in bloody rites of self-flagellation and even crucifixions during Holy Week. Aside from being frowned upon as a barbarous relic, the confraternity's activities disquieted American settlers in the area, and the Diocese moved to ban it. Bishop Lamy, in part from conversations with the confraternity's brothers, concluded that the Penitentes were a degenerated remnant of the Third Order of Saint Francis, which had accompanied Juan de Oñate into the territory nearly 250 years earlier but had been weakened by various events beginning with the Pueblo Revolt of 1680. This thesis was supported by accounts that Juan de Oñate flagellated himself shortly after entering New Mexico in commemoration of Holy Thursday; this event was taken to be the origin point of penance in the area.

The notion that the Penitentes were a degenerated remnant of the Third Order was adopted by protestant missionaries in the area, and by secular historians and writers. Charles Fletcher Lummis, a journalist who played a key role in promoting New Mexico as a tourist destination, first exposed the American public to the Penitentes through his writings, such as The Land of Poco Tiempo (1893). The book described the "Penitent Brothers" as a "savage", "pagan", and pseudo-Catholic secret society who controlled local politics through malfeasance, and was accompanied by photographs he took of a Holy Week procession (including a crucifixion). In the years following the release of The Land of Poco Tiempo, the Penitentes became a fixture of accounts of New Mexico, featuring in numerous articles and novels (including Willa Cather's Death Comes for the Archbishop). Scholars speculate that the increasing media visibility of the confraternity drove it into further secrecy, lest its ceremonies be misrepresented by Anglo-American writers.

What Ramón A. Gutiérrez describes as the "hegemonic" or mainstream historiography regarding the origin of the Penitentes emerged from research conducted by Angelico Chavez, a Hispano Franciscan Friar who was appointed archivist of the Archdiocese of Santa Fe in 1946. Using Spanish colonial sources, Chavez concluded that the thesis of Third-Order origin, taken as received wisdom by the mid-20th century, was incorrect. Chavez noted the absence of such an organization in a detailed account of the New Mexican church composed in 1777. However, Chavez noted Zubiría's 1833 condemnation of Penitentes, which Zubiría stated had been founded "a goodly number of years" prior. Thus, Chavez concluded that the confraternity had been formed "between 1790 and 1810", during a period of secularization in colonial Mexico, perhaps inspired by the import of an account of Spanish penitential processions and passion plays.

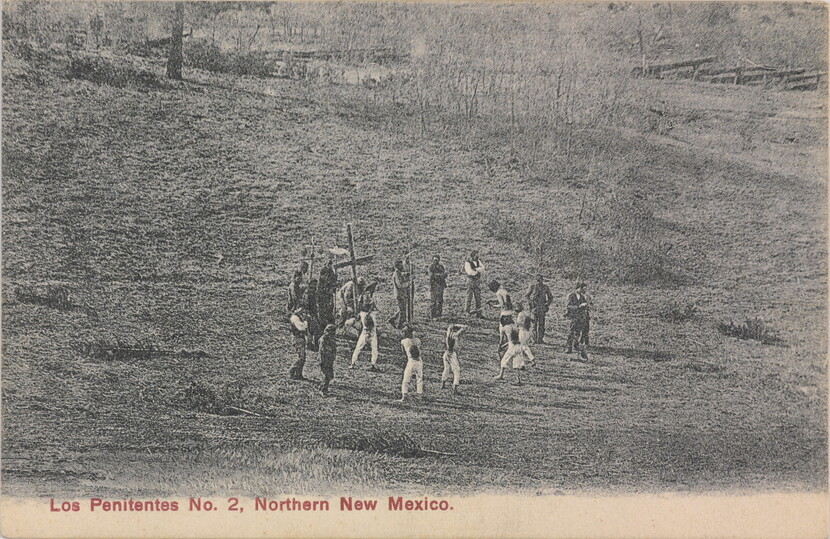
A c. 1910 view of Penitentes engaged in self-flagellation

Writing 22 years after Chavez in 1976, Marta Weigle proposed an alternative hypothesis which sought to reassess the traditional Third Order historiography. Drawing on sources composed after the reconquest of New Mexico from the Pueblo people in 1695, Weigle traced what she saw as the "basically Franciscan" practices of the Penitentes to the activities of Franciscan missionaries in northern New Mexico, who were mostly of Spanish origin and were first posted to New Spain. Spanish King Charles III's disputes with the Papacy resulted in him suppressing the Franciscans in New Spain and transferring their responsibilities to secular organs or the far-off Diocese of Durango. While they took decades to have effect, these events deprived Hispanos of the structures they were accustomed to, and former members of the Third Order took it upon themselves to form pseudo-Franciscan organizations, which became the Penitentes.

A third proposed origin was put forward in 1991 by art historian William Wroth, who uncovered a letter dating to 1833 (the same year of Zubiría's episcopal visitation) which denounces extreme penitential rites performed in Taos by a "hermandad de la Sangre de Cristo" (brotherhood of the Blood of Christ) and witnessed by a priest of the Diocese of Durango. Wroth linked this confraternity to similarly named ones established in Europe and, later, Mexico in the 16th and 17th centuries, and emphasized the similarity of the "hermandad de la Sangre de Cristo" with Spanish and Mexican confraternities. He concluded that a Spanish confraternity made its way to New Mexico in the early 19th century, and that the confraternity only acquired the "Penitente" label in the mid-19th century.

The most recent proposed origin was publicized in the late 1990s by historian Ramón A. Gutiérrez. Gutiérrez suggests that the Penitentes arose from a variety of local sources which coalesced inside of genízaro communities in the 18th century. Acknowledging the pervasive influence of Franciscan spirituality in colonial New Mexico, he suggested that the kernels of Penitente penance rites came from interactions between Franciscans and enslaved genízaros. The mid-18th century saw the founding of two confraternities in Santa Fe, the Confraternity of Our Lady of Light and the Confraternity of Our Lord Jesus Nazarene (popularly known as the "brothers of darkness" due to their devotion to the Passion); the latter confraternity was composed of poor men, often of Pueblo or genízaro descent. The latter confraternity is thought to have lent the Penitentes their popular moniker, the "brothers of darkness". In Gutiérrez's telling, the development of the distinct Penitente Brotherhood coincided with the formation of genízaro identity between the late 1700s and Mexican independence. Gutiérrez situates the still-current period of Penitente organization from the 1820s onward, when the confraternity's devotional practices diverged from the mainstream Spanish church in the area and acquired a secular, political dimension (by the archepiscopacy of Jean Baptiste Salpointe, Penitente hermanos mayor often concurrently served as town leaders).

Other origin theories exist; the website of the A.R. Mitchell Museum of Western Art states that the Penitentes arose as a pseudo-Franciscan structure due the expulsion of Spanish clerics during the Pueblo Revolt in 1680. A more well-attested to theory occasionally referenced in modern scholarly sources posits that the Penitentes arose in the 1820s in reaction to Mexican independence, when the Franciscans were expelled and New Mexico's other Catholic structures were temporarily put into disarray.

== Documented history ==
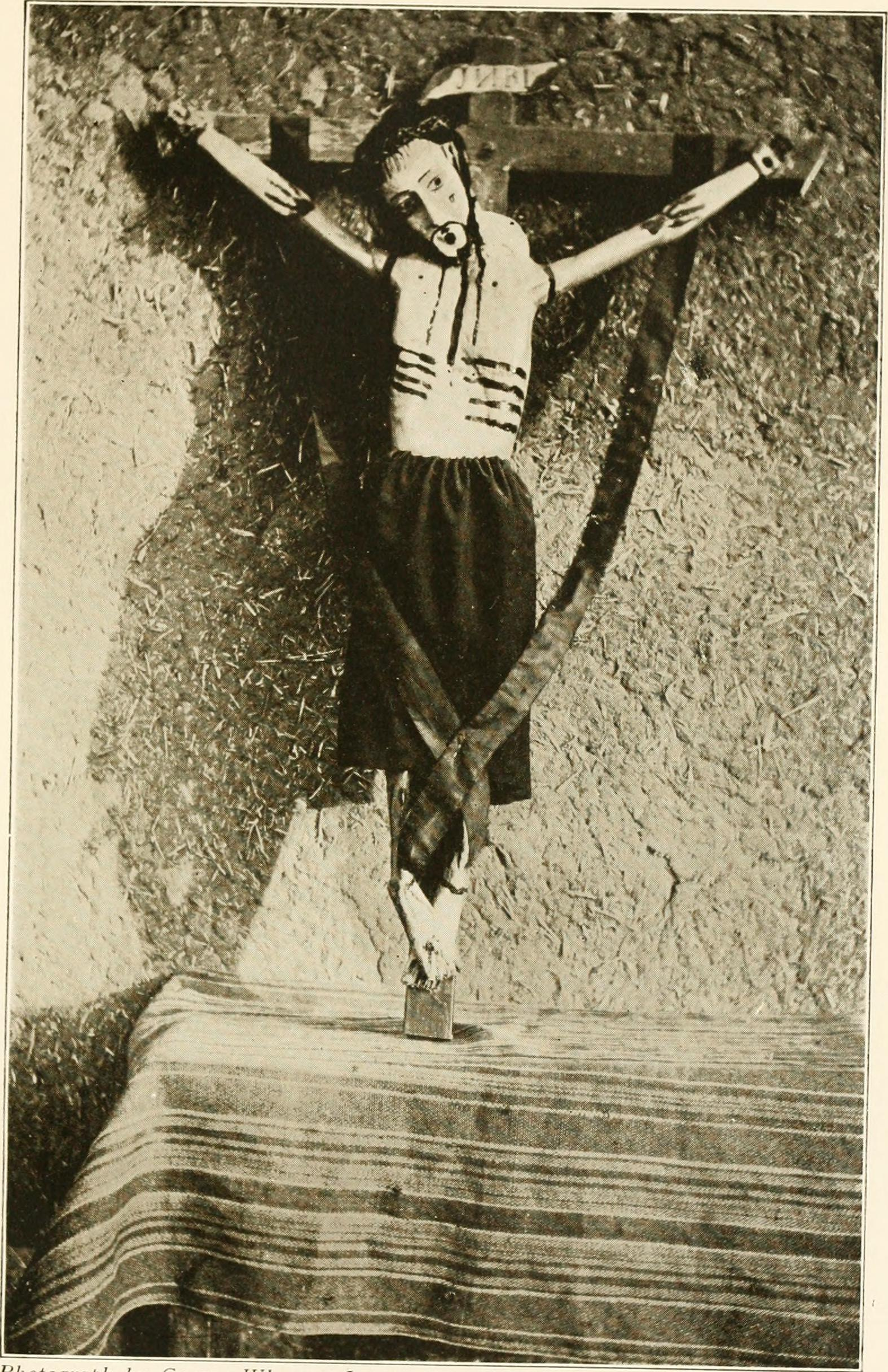
Stylized crucifix at the Morada of Our Lady of Guadalupe in Taos

Beyond scant mentions made prior to 1850, as discussed in the previous section, the documented history of the Penitentes begins with the acquisition of most of modern-day New Mexico after the Treaty of Guadalupe Hildago. Soon after arriving in the territory, J.B. Lamy became intensely suspicious of the group, and probably tried to abolish it altogether, although he did not succeed in this pursuit. Lamy and his successor Salpointe both attempted to "regularize" the confraternity under the assumption that it was a wayward remnant of the Third Order of Saint Francis. This entailed a rewriting of the group's rules to lessen the intensity and violence of penitential acts, confine its actions to the private sphere (as opposed to the traditional, public processions), and center the group's spiritual goals around "good Catholic living" and the sacraments. Judging from later suppression attempts, these regularization policies did not succeed. In the first Synod of the Diocese of Santa Fe, held in 1888, Salpointe issued a public condemnation of the confraternity, stating that it should "not be fostered in the least" and that priests should refuse to celebrate mass at Moradas or associate with unrepentant Penitentes. Catholic commentators, such as Angelico Chavez, attributed at least part of the hostility between the New Mexican Church and the Penitentes to agitation by protestant missionaries; in some cases, protestant missionaries attempted to win over Penitente leaders angered by the institutional crackdown on their organizations.

The crackdown bore some fruit for the Diocese of Santa Fe as some chapters acknowledged diocesan authority, but the time between the Diocese's foundation and 1880 actually represented a high point of Penitente activity in New Mexico, Colorado, and beyond. During this period, "nearly every Hispano-founded community in the upper Rio Grande region had its own morada". This zenith of Penitente activity occurred during the Territorial period, when "a majority" of Hispano men belonged to the confraternity in some respect. Marta Weigle notes that Penitente chapters at their mid- to late-19th century zenith, while concentrated in northern New Mexico and southern Colorado, may have stretched to Wyoming in the north, California in the west, and Texas in the east. The Penitentes only began declining in number in the 1890s, when institutional Catholic opposition and popular Anglo-American suspicion forced their practices underground. New Morada construction, however, continued through the 1920s, and by the 1930s the Penitentes had come on better terms with the institutional church and become a legally incorporated fraternal order. Although the political role of Penitente leaders declined as American state power was increasingly asserted (especially with the admittance of New Mexico into the Union in 1912), they continued to occupy prominent roles in local spiritual care for decades onward. The urbanization of the region's Hispano population was, perhaps, the greatest contributor to the decline of the Penitentes' ranks, as young Hispanos often moved to cities and adopted more conventional expressions of Catholic faith.

In 1979, the Kit Carson Memorial Foundation Museum attempted to open a morada it had purchased for public display in Taos. The plan was fiercely opposed by local Penitentes, over 100 of whom came to Taos to make public procession protesting the plans. The plans were shelved and the morada in question was transferred to a Catholic parish in 2008.

1999 marked the 400th anniversary of the first penitent act in the present-day United States (Oñate's aforementioned self-flagellation). On this occasion, Penitentes were invited to a special Stations of the Cross service at All Saint's Chapel in San Luis, Colorado and a seven-mile procession from the New Mexico state line to the Church of Our Lady of Guadalupe in Conejos, Colorado. About eighty men participated in the procession. The Penitentes are still active in some communities, and hold public Good Friday services and processions. However, their numbers have dwindled as its membership ages, and many moradas have fallen into ruin. Active Penitente chapters still using moradas have been reduced to a handful of remote towns and villages.

== Culture and practices ==
When J.B. Lamy arrived in New Mexico in 1850, he found that its 65,000 residents only were ministered to by about 16 priests, who mostly served on an itinerant basis. As a result, many towns and villages only saw mass celebrated once a month, or less. Regardless of the Penitentes' origins, this lacking pastoral care by the mid-19th century meant that the Penitentes filled an important religious role. Aside from public displays of faith, Penitente brothers took on responsibilities including catechism, funeral services, and interment.

=== Devotional practices ===
==== Holy Week ====
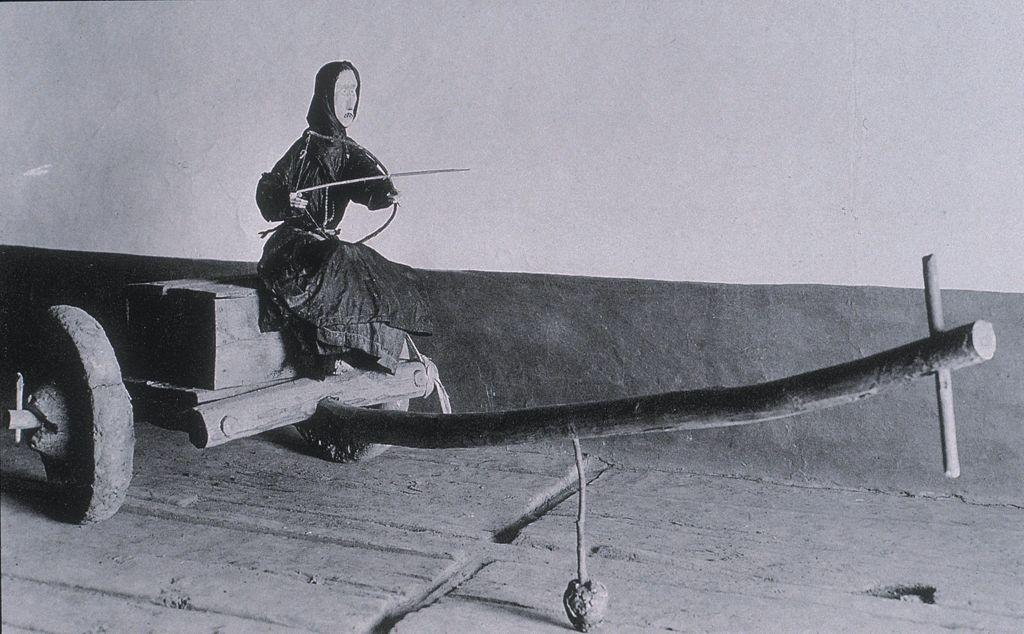
A Penitente "death cart" of the San Luis type from Las Trampas

The Penitentes have a particular devotion to the Passion and death of Christ, as illustrated by their highly-publicized Holy Week rituals. This devotion shares much with Franciscan thought, although some authors have speculated that parts of Penitente practice are derived from syncretism with pre-colonial indigenous Puebloan beliefs. The Penitentes are most publicly active around Holy Week, when they perform processions, Stations of the Cross ceremonies, and priest-led services in their moradas which are open to the public. Historically, Penitente brothers would confine themselves to the morada for the duration of Holy Week to hold vigil; during this time, they would be supplied with food by townspeople. Still today, processions move from the morada to a Calvary hill, where the brothers carry banners, statues of saints, and wooden crosses. Wooden crosses erected by the Penitentes remain ubiquitous in New Mexico, even in areas where the confraternity has gone extinct.

Prior to the 1920s, bloody physical penance occurred during these processions. Methods included various scourging by cacti, flagellation with Yucca disciplines, or the dragging of a heavy wooden cross or "death cart". Members participating in the penance typically wore masks to obscure their identity. The "death cart" is an item of particular interest for scholars of the Penitentes, as it is unique within present-day U.S. territory. The figures of death, called "La Muerte", "Nuestra Comadre Sebastiana" or "Doña Sebastiana" (Note: The use of "Sebastiana", the feminine version of "Sebastian", to refer to personifications of death postdates the invention of "death carts". Presumably, the use of arrows by personifications of death (which predates the development of death carts) recalled depictions of the martyrdom of Saint Sebastian to the Penitentes.) have two typical forms, the "Sangre de Cristo" and "San Luis" types. The former is a grotesquely formed wooden skeleton carrying a bow and arrow, often with horse hair on its head and a fashioned grimace. The latter type, thought to have been developed later by Nuevomexicano settlers in Colorado, takes the form of a crouching, black-robed figure made of rough blocks also holding a bow and arrow, with only the bodily extremities sculpted realistically. These carts, while distinct (particularly as they were pulled by men, not horses), are thought to be distantly based on Spanish and later Mexican Holy Week Pasos also featuring figures of death meant to illustrate the triumph of Christ over death. By dragging the heavy death cart, supported by roughly hewn wooden wheels, up a Calvary hill, Penitentes may have imagined themselves physically engaged in a struggle with death.

In some historic cases, Good Friday processions would terminate with the crucifixion of a devout Penitente brother. Documented examples were done with ropes, although nails were allegedly used for some of these crucifixions. The crucifixion of the chosen "Cristo" would be accompanied by other brothers representing, e.g., Simon of Cyrene, the penitent thief, and other figures of the passion, although only the "Cristo" would be crucified.

Generally, Penitente Holy Week processions are accompanied by chants, called alabados ("praises"). These Spanish chants are transmitted orally and based on Gregorian chant. Processions and recitation of alabados are frequently accompanied by pito flutes. While public physical penances ended in the early 20th century, contemporary Penitente Holy Week processions still feature alabados, Santos, banners, and crosses.

==== Other ====
For the rest of the year, Penitente brothers acted as spiritual helpers to their community. Besides private and public prayer services which featured chants and homilies, brothers might assist in caring for the sick and orphaned, harvesting produce, and assisting with unpaid land taxes. Such acts of charity were viewed within a triune devotional structure of "caridad, oración, and el buen ejemplo" (charity, prayer, and the good example (Note: "The Good Example" was understood to refer to the Imitation of Christ.)) which defined membership in the organization. Historically, some types of physical penance were publicly practiced outside of Holy Week, such as at funerals, which were frequently presided over by Penitentes. Alabados were sung at most of a town's spiritual events, particularly funerals. Prior to 1850, they were frequently featured in the liturgy when a priest was present. In the present day, Catholic priests work closely with local Penitentes, despite historic tensions.

A number of shrines and sacred sites in New Mexico were founded by or otherwise associated with the Penitentes. These include the Sanctuary at Chimayo and Los Portales Shrine, a healing spring near Seboyeta.

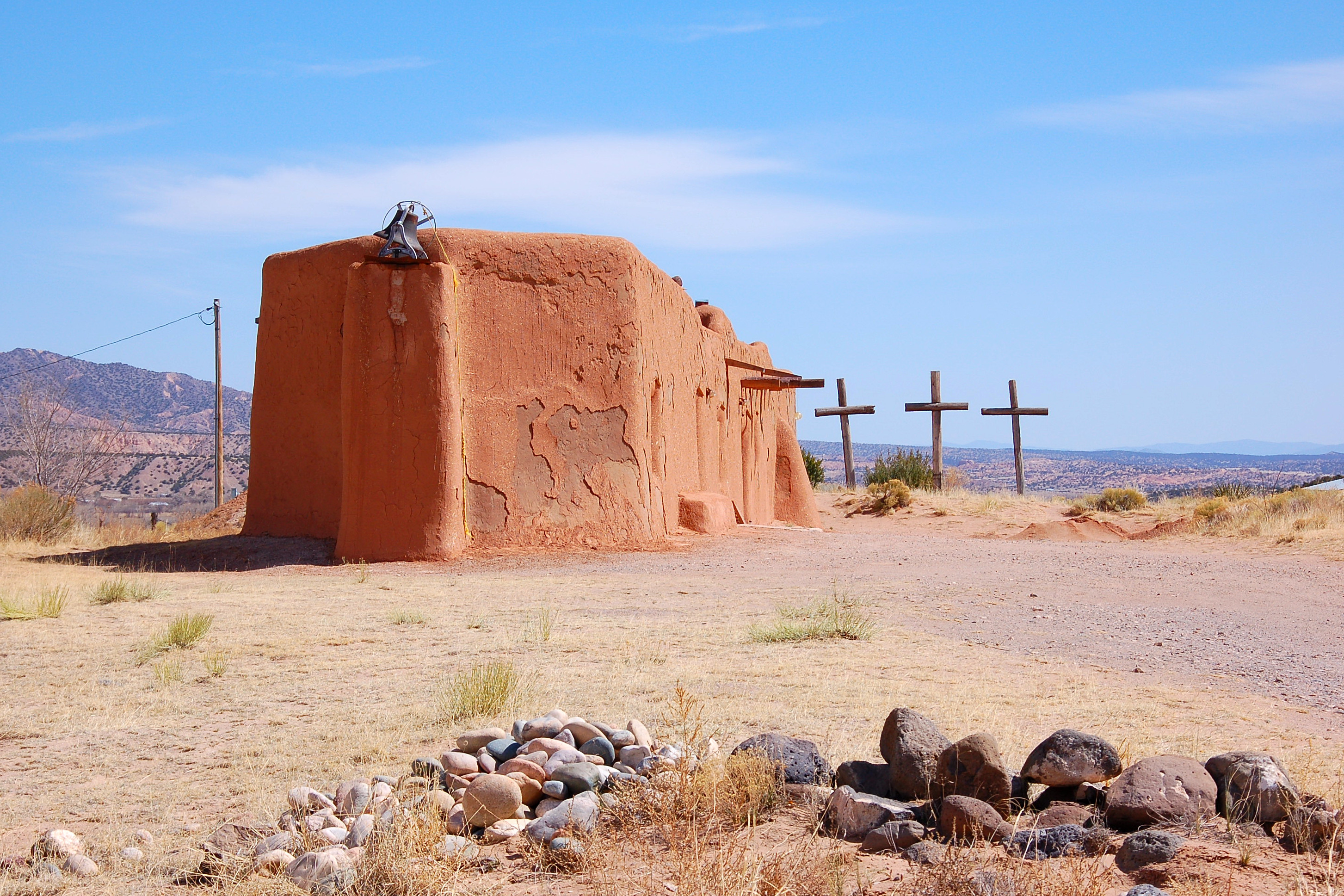
The Morada in Abiquiu

=== Moradas ===
Moradas, buildings built exclusively for religious services by Penitentes, were the year-round center of Penitente activity. They were typically humble and nondescript adobe buildings consisting of two rooms, a multi-purpose chapter room and a smaller chapel adorned with an altar. These dirt-floored buildings had more in common with domestic than ecclesiastical structures, and historically, most towns hosted both a Morada and a church. Moradas were typically built on the outskirts of a town, although they were occasionally situated next to the local parish church. Oftentimes, they were built next to graveyards. The chapter room usually had a fireplace and was the site of regular, private observances by the chapter members, along with meals and conversations. These rooms would also be inhabited by the Penitente brothers for the duration of Holy Week, which was a continuous vigil.

The chapel was often richly decorated with Bultos, Retablos, and statues used in processions. Uninitiated persons were almost never allowed within the Morada, which usually had very few, small windows to ensure the privacy of worship by brothers. Oftentimes, large crosses such as those used in the Holy Week processions were propped against the exterior walls of the buildings, making outsiders aware of the building's function. Some Moradas featured bell towers or additional rooms, such as storage chambers or kitchens. Depending on the number of Penitentes in a town, more than one Morada could be present.

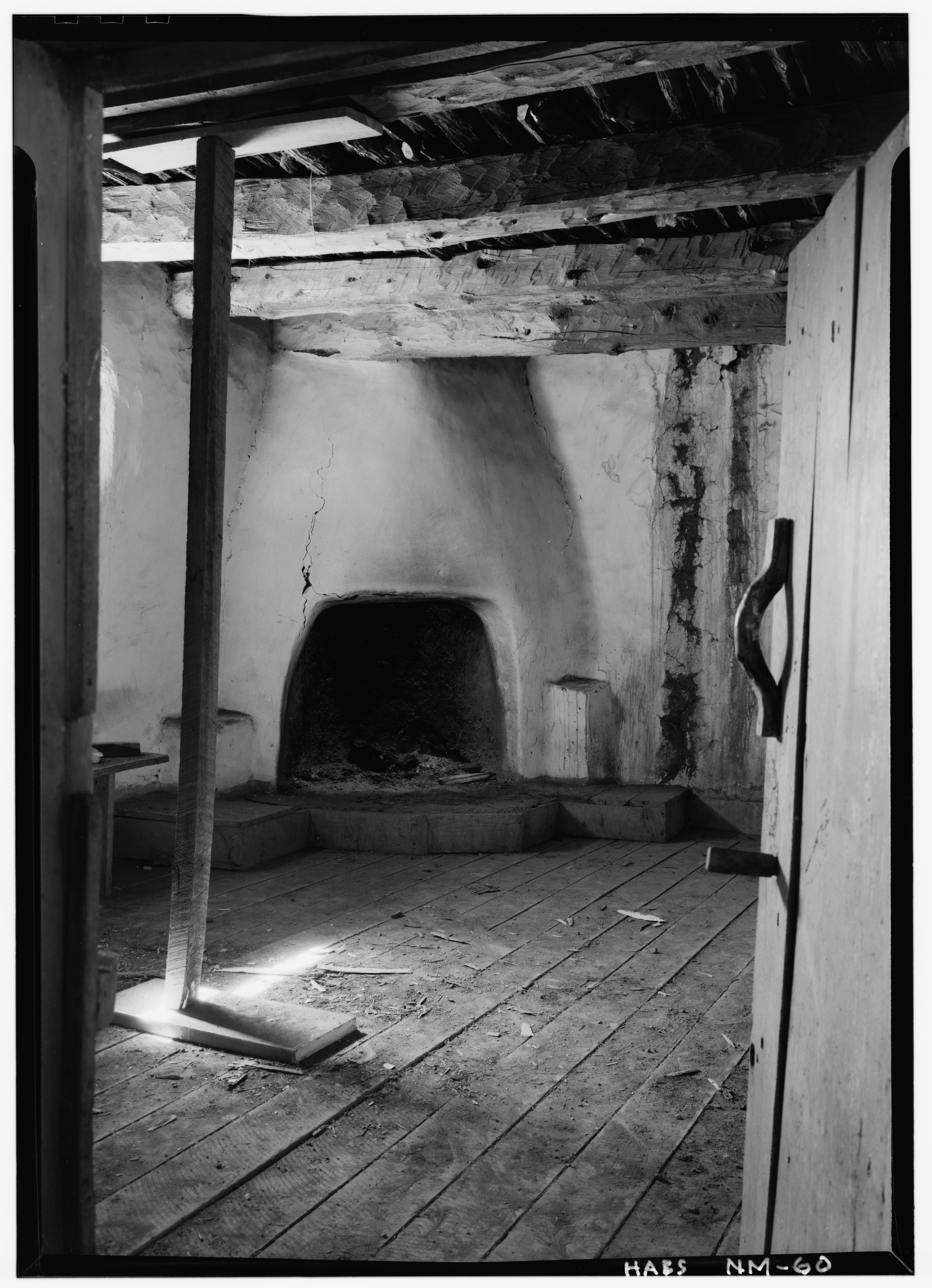
Fireplace in the chapter room of Arroyo Hondo's then-disused Morada (now a private residence)

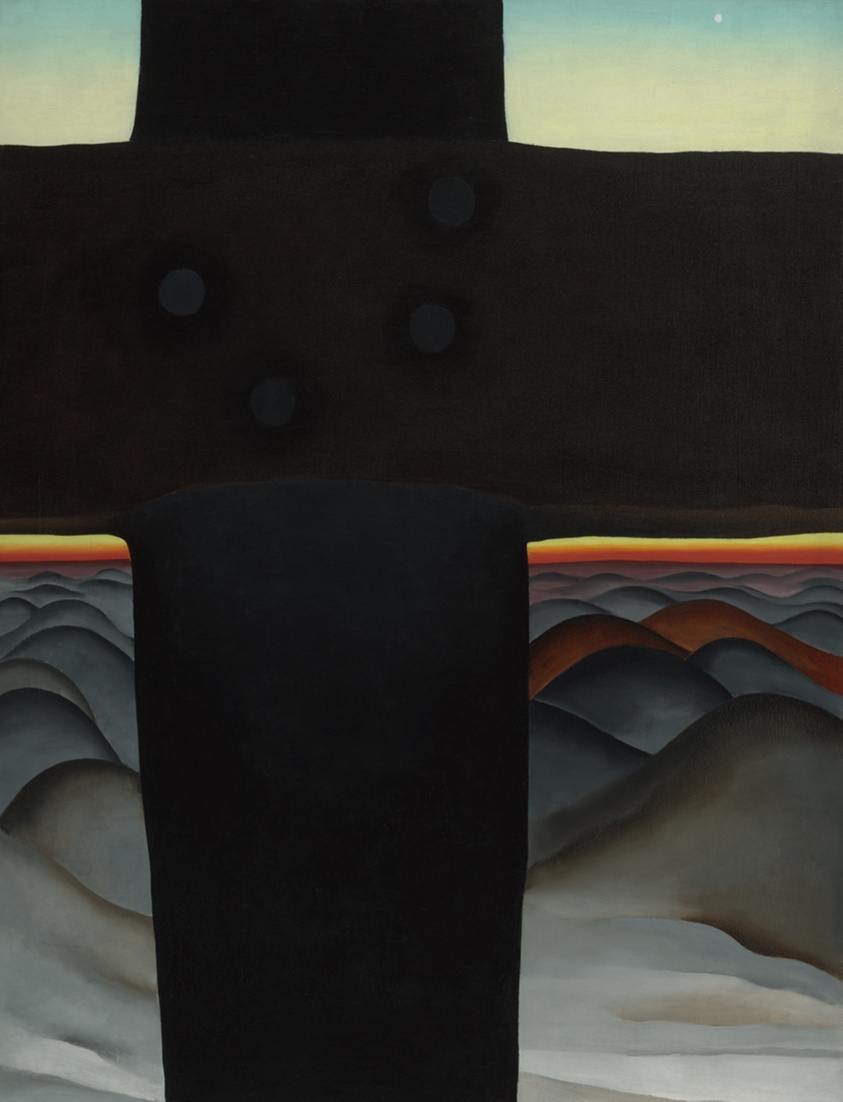
To Georgia O'Keeffe, the crosses erected by the Penitentes in New Mexico represented "a thin dark veil of the Catholic church spread over the New Mexico landscape".

Many, if not a majority of, Moradas have been abandoned and fallen into ruin in recent decades, as Penitente membership declines and rural Hispano villages lose their populations. Very few continue in their original use, and some have been converted to houses or museums.

=== Initiation and membership ===
Membership in the Penitentes is exclusive and usually passed down through families. Penitente chapters are presided over by a Hermano Mayor, or chief brother. This man was chosen by the rest of the chapter through an election, and besides his spiritual functions (such as presiding over funerals), he often served as a local justice of the peace and civic leader. According to Betty Applegate's 1934 account, rules dictated that a chapter have nine other officers, namely a Celador (warden), Coajutor (helper), Enfermero (nurse), Mandatario (financial secretary), Maestro de Novios (teacher of novices), Sangrador ("pricker"), Resador (man who prays (Note: i.e. chanting during processions)), and Pitero (flautist). Collectively, these officers were known as Hermanos de Luz (brothers of light), and held all the crucial roles in the chapter. The other members, or "brothers of darkness", often were poorer relative to the officers and undertook the majority of physical penances.

The criteria of membership for men, besides descent, included lengthy tests of piety (including self-flagellation), and initiation was sealed by the incision of several crosses into the back of the initiate by the "pricker". Initiation ceremonies were held during Holy Week, and included foot-washing, a series of prepared questions, and long prayers.

==== Women ====
Women are not allowed to be members of the all-male confraternity, but had varying roles adjacent to and supporting the practice of Penitentes, including a semi-official role as "auxiliary" or Ayudante. This role could entail a sacred vow to the confraternity. On Good Friday, adult women often had a parallel procession "centered around the suffering of Mary" during the Passion. This womens' procession could intersect with the main male procession in order to reenact the encounter with Veronica; two girls, "Veronicas", could temporarily assume the head of the procession at this point.

Women also frequently instructed their sons in the Alabados, the memorization of which was necessary for membership in the Penitentes. During the sequestration of brothers in the Morada for Holy Week, women delivered food to them. Acts of charity committed by women, such as the hosting of orphans or assistance to invalids, were understood to be expressions of Penitente spirituality.

In recent years, many widows and daughters of deceased Penitente brothers have taken responsibility for the care of Moradas.

== In culture ==
After their activities were publicized by writers such as Lummis, the Penitentes became one of the most popular subjects in cultural depictions of New Mexico. Ramón A. Gutiérrez writes that much of the early cultural production regarding the Penitentes had an orientalist character, as the Penitentes were frequently depicted as exotic, benighted, savage, and fanatic. Lummis himself drew direct parallels between the landscape and natives (including Hispanos) of New Mexico and Egypt, and compared photographing the Penitentes to a safari.

The Penitentes provided ample inspiration for the many Anglo-American artists who settled in and depicted New Mexico beginning in the early 20th century, including Georgia O'Keeffe, Russell Cheney, Joseph Henry Sharp, and Cady Wells. These depictions frequently reflected the notion that the Penitentes were a mysterious and possibly barbaric relic, and sometimes were works of pure imagination inspired by photographs and travelogues.

Willa Cather's 1927 novel Death Comes for the Archbishop included references and scenes of the Penitentes and their rituals.

In the novel Brave New World, the Penitentes are shown in a video at a school, which causes the class to laugh at their rituals. They are also compared to savages in the 1946 foreword by Aldous Huxley.

The 1936 roadshow exploitation film Lash of the Penitentes combines old footage of the Penitente's ritual flagellation with new footage about a murder.

The novel Dayspring (1945) by Harry Sylvester depicts an anthropologist who studies the Penitentes and eventually joins them.

Near the end of Cormac McCarthy's Blood Meridian (1985), the book's protagonist, the man, comes across a Penitente Good Friday procession featuring a death cart.

Percival Everett’s novel The Body of Martin Aguilera (1997) features Penitente characters and rituals as part of a murder mystery set in northern New Mexico. Everett also utilizes Penitente characters for his short story "Warm and Nicely Buried" from his collection Damned If I Do (2004).

Kirstin Valdez Quade’s novel The Five Wounds (2021) takes place in New Mexico and heavily features Penitente characters and rituals.
