= Yn (disambiguation) =

Yn is a letter of the old Romanian Cyrillic alphabet.

YN or Yn may also refer to:

- Yn (Georgian letter), an additional letter of the Georgian alphabet
- Yeoman (United States Navy), a rank
- A US Navy hull classification symbol: Yard net tender (YN)
- Yoctonewton, a unit of force equal to 10^{−24} newtons
- Yottanewton, a unit of force equal to 10^{24} newtons
- 2C-YN, an analogue of the phenethylamine derived hallucinogen 2C-E
- Yes–no question
- Yunnan, a province of China (Guobiao abbreviation YN)
- Y/N, a 2023 novel by Esther Yi
- Yttrium nitride
- Your name, an abbreviation used in self-insert fan fiction
