= Brianda =

Brianda is a feminine Spanish language given name. People with the name include:

- Brianda de Acuña (1576–1630), Spanish nun and writer
- Brianda Cruz (born 1998), Mexican boxer
- Brianda Domecq (born 1942), Spanish-Mexican novelist
- Brianda Pereira (c. 1550 – c. 1620), Azorean known for her role during the Battle of Salga
