= Fieldwork (disambiguation) =

Field work or Fieldwork may refer to:

- Field work (scientific method)
- Field fortifications
- Fieldwork (novel), novel by American journalist Mischa Berlinski
- Field Work (poetry collection), poetry collection by Seamus Heaney
- Fieldwork, a jazz trio with Vijay Iyer and varying sidemen
