= Anna Weyant =

Canadian painter

- Born: 1995 (age 30–31); Calgary, Alberta, Canada
- Education: Rhode Island School of Design
- Occupation: Visual artist

Anna Weyant (born 1995) is a Canadian artist whose figurative paintings blend influence from the Dutch Golden Age with an awareness of contemporary popular culture and social media.

Weyant has been represented globally since May 2022 by Gagosian Gallery, owned by Larry Gagosian, whom Weyant was in a relationship with for several years. The artist's relationship to Gagosian has been discussed widely in art publications and news outlets.

== Early life and education ==
Weyant was born in Calgary, Alberta. She graduated with a Bachelor of Fine Arts from Rhode Island School of Design in 2017, where she studied painting. She moved to New York City where she was joined by her brother, actor Austin Weyant.

== Career ==
Weyant primarily works as figurative painter. Weyant has cited Dutch Masters, as well as contemporary artists like John Currin, as influences. Many of her works depict women rendered in dark, moody scenes.

Weyant was formerly represented by Blum & Poe but had a falling out with Tim Blum, a director at the gallery, before joining Gagosian Gallery in May 2022.

In May 2022, Weyant's Falling Woman (2020) sold for US$1.62 million at Sotheby's in New York. Falling Woman was consigned to sale by Tim Blum, Weyant's former gallerist, in what a reporter for Artnet News described as a "revenge consignment." Falling Woman is also the featured artwork on the cover of Big Swiss, a 2023 novel by Jen Beagin.

In 2024, Weyant painted model Kaia Gerber for the December cover of Vogue.

In 2025, Weyant was appointed to the 2026 Met Gala's host committee, co-chaired by Anthony Vaccarello and Zoë Kravitz.

== Reception and criticism ==
Discussing Weyant's exhibition splinter (2022) at Blum & Poe, Rae Niwa wrote in Flaunt that Weyant has a "meticulous approach to color and line," noting that "there is a spaciousness and lightness in the work." Conversely, reporter and critic Alex Greenberger, writing for ARTnews, described Weyant's first solo exhibition with Gagosian Gallery, Baby, It Ain't Over Till It's Over (2022), as "an overly safe dud," labeling the show "just another market-ready figurative painting show in New York by a young painter."

Prior to joining Gagosian Gallery, the artist's work received very little attention from curators, critics, and the media. Weyant and her relationship with Larry Gagosian have since been extensively discussed in the media, with several critics connecting the relationship to Weyant's fast rise to prominence and high auction results so early in her career. Others, including gallerists and artists supportive of Weyant, have said these claims and criticisms are misogynistic. Artnet News reported in early 2024 that Weyant and Gagosian had separated, although she continued to be represented by his gallery.

== Exhibitions ==
Weyant has staged seven solo exhibitions:

- Welcome to the Dollhouse (2019), 56 Henry, New York
- Loose Screw (2021), Blum & Poe, Los Angeles
- Splinter (2022), Blum & Poe, Tokyo
- Baby, It Ain't Over Till It's Over (2022), Gagosian Gallery, New York
- The Guitar Man (2023), Gagosian Gallery, Paris
- Who’s Afraid of the Big Bad Wolves? (2023), Gagosian Gallery, London
- Anna Weyant (2025), Thyssen-Bornemisza Museum, Madrid

Weyant's work has also been featured in several group exhibitions, including Artists Inspired by Music: Interscope Reimagined (2022) at the Los Angeles County Museum of Art.
