= The Five Wounds (novel) =

2021 novel by Kirstin Valdez Quade

- First edition cover
- Author: Kirstin Valdez Quade
- Language: English
- Set in: Las Penas, New Mexico
- Publisher: W. W. Norton & Company
- Publication date: March 30, 2021
- Publication place: United States
- Media type: Print (hardcover), ebook, audiobook
- Pages: 432 pp.
- Awards: First Novel Prize (2021)
- ISBN: 978-0-393-24283-6 (hardcover 1st ed.)
- OCLC: 1156993141
- Dewey Decimal: 813/.6
- LC Class: PS3617.U25 F58 2021

The Five Wounds is the debut novel by American author Kirstin Valdez Quade, published by W. W. Norton & Company on March 30, 2021. It is an expansion of Quade's short story of the same name, which was first published in The New Yorker and later collected in her debut short story collection, Night at the Fiestas (2015). The Five Holy Wounds suffered by Jesus Christ during the crucifixion is used as a metaphor in the novel.

== Premise ==
Amadeo Padilla, a struggling alcoholic, lives with his pregnant daughter, Angel, and ailing mother, Yolanda, in Las Penas, New Mexico. He is selected to portray Jesus Christ in the town's annual play which reenacts the Passion of Jesus and is organized by the Roman Catholic lay group Los Hermanos Penitentes.

== Reception ==
The novel received starred reviews from Kirkus Reviews, Library Journal, Booklist, and Publishers Weekly.

Kirkus Reviews described it as "a novel built around a fierce, flawed, and loving family" anchored by "perfectly rendered characters." In their starred review, Publishers Weekly praised the "well-developed characters [who] convey palpable emotion" and called Quade's depiction of the novel's community "pitch perfect." Library Journal's verdict was that this "expertly crafted story of family and community introduces us to often needy characters for whom readers come to care deeply."

Booklist commended Quade for "ably deliver[ing] a story that is nuanced and authentic without melodrama... [it's a] generous tale of characters who understand the inevitability of fate but try to forge ahead anyway in the hope of breaking free." In The New York Times, Alexandra Chang added, "Quade has created a world bristling with compassion and humanity" with characters whose challenges are "wholly realized and moving." Concluding, she affirmed "their journeys span a wide spectrum of emotion and it is impossible not to root for all three."

It was named one of the best books of the year by NPR and Publishers Weekly.

== Awards ==
| Year | Award | Category | Result | Ref |
|---|---|---|---|---|
| 2021 | Center for Fiction First Novel Prize | — | Won | |
| 2022 | Andrew Carnegie Medals for Excellence | Fiction | Shortlisted | |
| 2022 | Aspen Words Literary Prize | — | Shortlisted | |
| 2022 | BookTube Prize | Fiction | Shortlisted | |
| 2022 | Lambda Literary Award | Lesbian Fiction | Shortlisted | |
| 2022 | Mark Twain American Voice in Literature Award | — | Shortlisted | |
| 2022 | Maya Angelou Book Award | — | Shortlisted | |
| 2022 | VCU Cabell First Novelist Award | — | Shortlisted | |
