= Hannah Tinti =

American writer and editor (born 1973)

- Born: 1973 (age 52–53); United States
- Education: Connecticut College (BA); New York University (MA)
- Occupations: Writer, editor
- Writing career
- Notable work: The Good Thief
- Notable awards: Center for Fiction First Novel Prize 2008 The Good Thief; Alex Award 2009 The Good Thief
- Website: hannahtinti.com

Hannah Tinti (born 1973) is an American writer and the co-founder of One Story magazine. She is the winner of the PEN/Nora Magid Award for Magazine Editing, the American Library Association’s Alex Award, and The Center for Fiction’s First Novel Prize.

== Early life ==
Tinti was born in Salem, Massachusetts in 1973. She graduated from Connecticut College in 1994 and the Graduate Creative Writing Program at New York University in 1997. She has worked in bookstore sales, magazine publishing, in literary agencies, and as a commentator for Public Radio’s Selected Shorts.

== Career ==
Her first novel, The Good Thief, published in 2008, was a New York Times Notable Book of the Year, and received the American Library Association's Alex Award and the Center for Fiction First Novel Prize. She also published a short story collection, Animal Crackers, a runner-up for the PEN/Hemingway Award. Her novel The Twelve Lives of Samuel Hawley was published in 2017. It was named a best book of 2017 by National Public Radio and the Washington Post. Brooklyn Magazine named her one of 100 "Most Influential People in Brooklyn Culture." She is Visiting Graduate Faculty at New York University.

Tinti co-founded the literary magazine One Story in 2002 with Maribeth Batcha. She was Editor-in-Chief of One Story from 2002-2016. One Story has won numerous awards including the AWP Small Press Award, the Whiting Literary Magazine Prize, and the CLMP Firecracker Award. Contributors to One Story include Ann Patchett, Dave Eggers, Lily King, Lauren Groff, and Chimamanda Ngozi Adichie.

== Works ==
- Animal Crackers, Review, 2005. ISBN 9780755307456, OCLC 938603988
- The Good Thief , 2008. ISBN 9781423385318, OCLC 972710275
- The Twelve Lives of Samuel Hawley, 2017. ISBN 9780812989885
