= Vacuum in the Dark =

2019 novel by Jen Beagin

- Author: Jen Beagin
- Audio read by: Jayme Mattler
- Cover artist: Alex Merto
- Language: English
- Genre: Dark Humor
- Published: 2019
- Publisher: Simon & Schuster
- Pages: 224
- ISBN: 978-1501182143
- Preceded by: Pretend I'm Dead

Vacuum in the Dark is the second novel written by Jen Beagin, published in 2019 by Simon & Schuster. It is the sequel to Pretend I'm Dead.

== Release ==
Literary Hub featured an excerpt of "Poop," the first chapter of Vacuum in the Dark.

The title has been published in the UK and as a paperback, both with new book cover artwork.

UK Cover, Oneworld Publications.

Paperback Cover, Simon & Schuster.

== Response ==
NPR described the work as "a funny and surprisingly sweet book about a young woman who grew up too fast and is trying desperately to reinvent herself."

Vacuum in the Dark, "a welcome sequel to one of last year’s most exciting debuts," according to a starred Kirkus review, was named a best book for February 2019 by Oprah Magazine. Publishers Weekly has a starred review of "a sharp and superb novel" which "pulls no punches—this novel is viciously smart and morbidly funny." That sentiment is echoed in The New York Times Book Review which said, "This novel is a joy: truly laugh-out-loud funny, while staying grounded and dignified, even as Mona capsizes again and again."
