= De'Shawn Charles Winslow =

American fiction writer

- Education: University of Iowa
- Occupation: Writer
- Writing career
- Genre: Fiction
- Notable work: In West Mills
- Notable awards: The Center for Fiction First Novel Prize, American Book Award
- Website: deshawncharleswinslow.com

De'Shawn Charles Winslow is an American novelist and the author of In West Mills, which won the Center for Fiction First Novel Prize and an American Book Award, and Decent People.

== Literary career ==
Winslow attended the Iowa Writers' Workshop. His debut novel, In West Mills, was published by Bloomsbury in 2019.

The New York Times Book Review gave it a rave review:

From the first page, Winslow establishes an uncanny authority and profound tone that belie the book’s debut status. The precision and charm of his language lure us in and soothe us ... He paints a community so tightknit and thorough it becomes easy to forget the people in it don’t exist.

The Boston Globe called it a "quietly glorious novel" that "engages on a level that’s appropriately intimate." The Atlanta Journal-Constitution described it as an "enchanting debut novel," writing that it is "a refreshing and arresting book that shines a light on a woman who rebels against society’s strict and unforgiving social norms, despite the costs."

Winslow's second novel, Decent People, was released in 2023. The Washington Post wrote: "Watching Winslow subvert the conventions of an old literary form is half the thrill of this novel. After all, the shelf of mystery detectives is hardly crowded with 60-year-old Black women. And that’s not the only cozy convention Winslow toys with."

== Publications ==
- In West Mills (Bloomsbury, 2019)
- Decent People (Bloomsbury, 2023)
- The Fervent Whites (One World, 2026)
