= John Pipkin =

American author

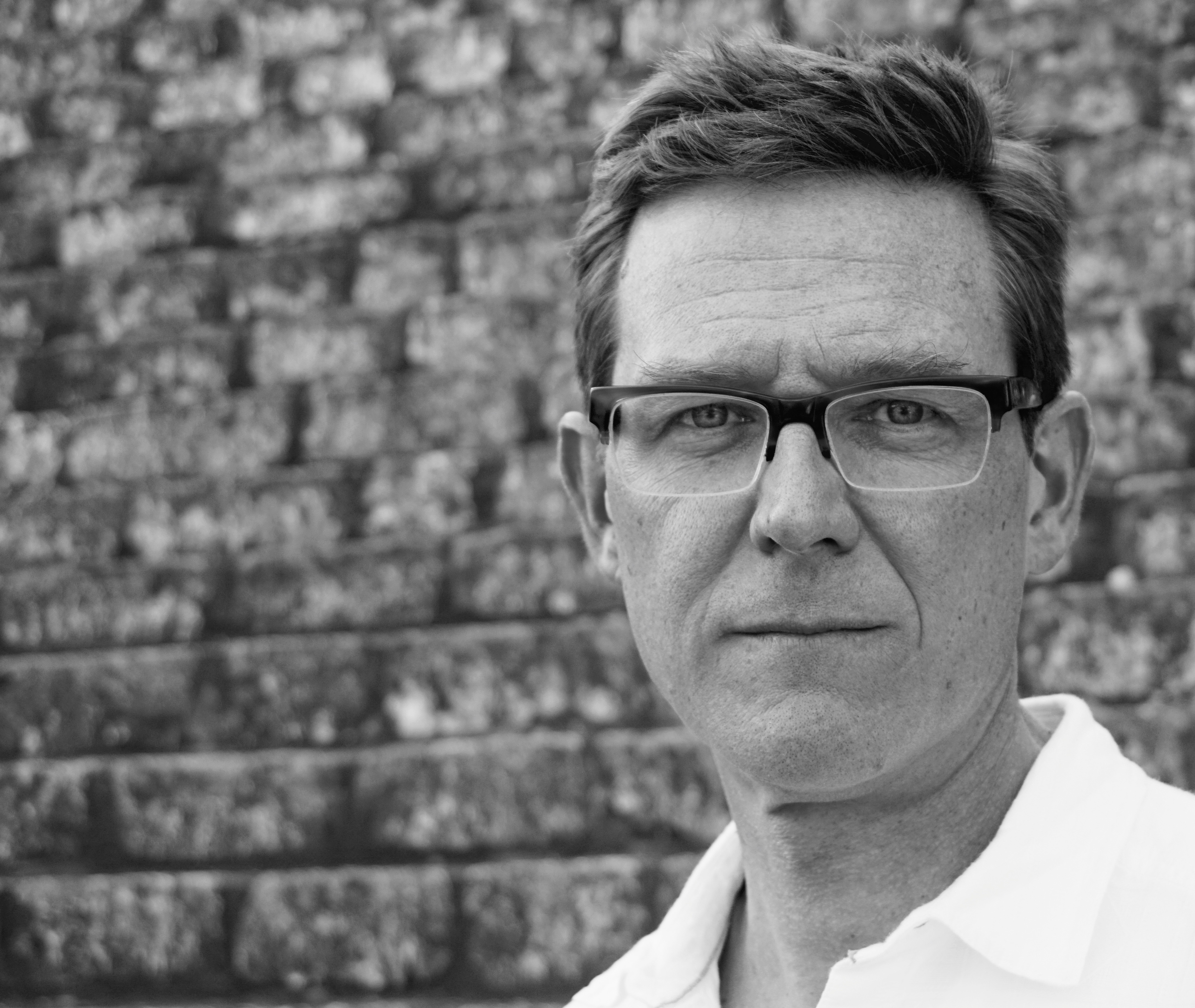
- Pipkin in Austin, Texas, February 2016
- Born: John George Pipkin; 1967 (age 58–59); Baltimore, Maryland, U.S.
- Education: Washington and Lee University (BA); University of North Carolina, Chapel Hill (MA); Rice University (PhD)
- Occupation: Author
- Writing career
- Notable awards: Center for Fiction First Novel Prize (2009)

John George Pipkin (born 1967) is an American author, born in Baltimore, Maryland. He holds a PhD in British Romantic Literature from Rice University in Houston, Texas; an MA in English from UNC-Chapel Hill, and a BA from Washington & Lee University in Lexington, Virginia. He has published two novels to good reviews and awards.

== Biography ==
His first novel, Woodsburner, won the Center for Fiction First Novel Prize, the Massachusetts Center for the Book Fiction Prize, and the Texas Institute of Letters Steven Turner Award.

Woodsburner is a historical novel that revolves around a little-known event in the life of Henry David Thoreau: in 1844, Thoreau accidentally set fire to 300 acres of woods around Concord, Massachusetts. Pipkin imagines the effect of that fire upon Thoreau, as well as three other characters, whose fictional stories are interwoven with the philosopher's. The book was well-reviewed by a variety of critics, including Brenda Wineapple in The New York Times and Ron Charles in The Washington Post.

In 2010, Pipkin was named writer-in-residence at Southwestern University. That year he was awarded the Dobie Paisano Fellowship from the Texas Institute of Letters. He teaches writing at the University of Texas at Austin, and in Spalding University's Low-Residency MFA Program.

Pipkin's second historical novel, The Blind Astronomer's Daughter, was published by Bloomsbury US in October 2016. This novel is set in Romantic-era Ireland and England. It centers on William Herschel's discovery of Uranus and the resulting influences on culture and society.

Pipkin has been awarded a 2016 MacDowell Colony (New Hampshire) Residential Fellowship for work on his third novel.
