= Eleven Days War =

The following major military operations have sometimes been unofficially referred as Eleven Days War or Eleven Day War:

- Operation Faustschlag, a 1918 Central Powers offensive against Soviet Russia during World War I
- Operation Linebacker II, a 1972 United States bombing campaign against North Vietnam during Vietnam War.
- Invasion of Yugoslavia, attack of Nazi-Germany on Yugoslavia from 6th to 17th April 1941
- Operation Guardian of the Walls, part of the 2021 Israel–Palestine crisis
- 2024 Syrian opposition offensives, an offensive launched by various rebel factions against the Assad government

== See also ==
- Eleven Days (disambiguation)
