= Indelicacy =

2020 novel by Amina Cain

- Hardcover First Edition
- Author: Amina Cain
- Language: English
- Publisher: Farrar, Straus and Giroux
- Publication date: February 11, 2020
- Publication place: United States
- Pages: 161
- ISBN: 9780374148379; Hardcover First Edition
- OCLC: 1102103985
- Dewey Decimal: 813/.6
- LC Class: PS3603.A377 I53 2020 lccn.loc.gov/2019024885

Indelicacy is a 2020 novel by American writer Amina Cain. The novel follows the life of its narrator, Vitória, from shortly before her marriage until shortly after its dissolution.

== Writing, composition, and background ==
The novel took Cain four years to write. The novel is partially set in an unnamed museum and for inspiration, Cain visited the National Gallery in London and the Frick Collection in New York City. The city in which the novel takes place also never receives a name, and Cain has referred to it as "a combination of Chicago, London, and then some imagined place".

Cain had several drafts for the novel, and has referred to earlier versions of the book as "terrible".

== Reception ==
=== Critical reception ===
Isabel Berwick, writing in a review for the Financial Times, referred to the novel as "[...] a strange, short, beguiling book." This sentiment was echoed in The New Yorker, which called the book "sparse" and "elliptical".

Berwick grouped Cain's work with that of Jenny Offill and Ottessa Moshfegh, calling their styles "modern flat".

=== Honors ===
The book was shortlisted for the 2020 Center for Fiction First Novel Prize.

Year	Award	Category	Result	Ref
2020	Center for Fiction First Novel Prize	—	Shortlisted	
2021	Rathbones Folio Prize	—	Shortlisted	
