= Corey Sobel =

American novelist

- Education: Duke University
- Occupation: Author
- Notable work: The Redshirt
- Website: corey-sobel.com

Corey Sobel is an American author and former linebacker for the Duke Blue Devils. His debut novel, The Redshirt, was a finalist for the 2020 Center for Fiction First Novel Prize.
