= Amina Cain =

American writer

- Writing career
- Notable work: Indelicacy

Amina Cain is an American writer, best known for her 2020 novel Indelicacy.

== Writing ==
Cain began writing in her last year as an undergraduate. Cain lived in Chicago during the mid-2000s and later moved to Los Angeles, where she continues to live as of 2020.

Writers who have influenced Cain's work include Lydia Davis. Other writers Cain has expressed an "affinity toward" include Marguerite Duras, Renee Gladman, Azareen Van der Vliet Oloomi, and Kate Zambreno.

== Honors ==
Indelicacy was shortlisted for the 2020 Center for Fiction First Novel Prize and for the 2021 Folio Prize.

== Bibliography ==
=== Novels ===
- Indelicacy (FSG, 2020) ISBN 978-0374148379

=== Short story collections ===
- I Go to Some Hollow (Les Figues Press, 2009) ISBN 978-1-934254-09-7
- Creature (Dorothy, 2013) ISBN 978-0-9844693-8-3

=== Nonfiction ===
- A Horse at Night: On Writing (Dorothy, 2022) ISBN 978-1-948980-13-5
