= The Blind Astronomer's Daughter =

2016 novel by John Pipkin

- Author: John Pipkin
- Language: English
- Genre: Historical fiction
- Publisher: Bloomsbury
- Publication date: 2016
- Pages: 461
- ISBN: 9781632861894

The Blind Astronomer's Daughter (New York, Bloomsbury, 2016) is a historical novel by John Pipkin, set largely on an estate in Ireland in the late 18th century. After its English owner comes to live there, he and his wife adopt a local infant girl. The novel explores her life and those around her.

== Plot summary ==
The novel tells the story of Caroline Ainsworth, from roughly 1750 to 1840. Born to a poor Irish peasant family, she is named Siobhan before being abandoned. She is taken in by Owen O'Siodha and his wife, who live with their children on New Park estate, where he is the blacksmith. The couple have sons of their own and had also adopted a foundling boy, Finn.

In England Arthur Ainsworth inherits his family's estates, which include New Park. Arthur is keenly interested in astronomy, and gradually becomes obsessed with competing with William Herschel for discoveries in the night sky. In particular, Arthur thinks there is a planet closer to the Sun than Mercury, and he eventually goes blind looking for it against the Sun's disk.

Before Arthur moves from England to New Park, he meets the young Theodosia in a bookstore. They court briefly and marry. After they settle at New Park months later, she gives birth to twin girls, who die soon after birth. Owen and Moira offer baby Siobhan to Arthur and Theodosia for adoption.

Soon after the wealthier couple adopt the baby girl, Theodosia dies, leaving Arthur a widowed father. He renames the girl Caroline. Arthur with his young daughter, and Owen and his family, struggle for years to keep the estate running smoothly. Arthur orders construction of an observatory on top of the manor house so he can pursue his ambitions in astronomy.

As adults Caroline and Finn fall in love, but the unrest of the Irish Rebellion of 1798 disrupts their lives and separates them. Caroline never learns what happens to Finn.
