= Hilary Leichter =

American writer and academic

- Occupation: Writer
- Notable works: Temporary (2020)

Website
- www.hilaryleichter.com

Hilary Leichter is an American writer and academic.

She lives in Brooklyn, New York and teaches at Columbia University. She is the author of the novels Temporary (2020) and Terrace Story. Temporary was a finalist for the Center for Fiction First Novel Prize and was a New York Times editor's choice.

Leichter has been awarded a fellowship from the New York Foundation for the Arts.

In 2025 Leichter was longlisted for the International Dublin Literary Award for Terrace Story.

She was awarded the 2026 Whiting Award in Fiction.

== Bibliography ==
- —— (2020). Temporary. Coffee House Press. ISBN 9781566895668.
- —— (2023). Terrace Story. Ecco. ISBN 9780063265813.
