= Big Swiss =

2023 novel by Jen Beagin

- Cover of Big Swiss: A Novel
- Author: Jen Beagin
- Audio read by: Rebecca Lowman (Narrator); Carlotta Brentan (Narrator); Stephen Graybill (Narrator); Joy Osmanski (Narrator); Matt Pittenger (Narrator)
- Illustrator: Anna Weyant
- Cover artist: Jaya Miceli
- Language: English
- Genre: Literary fiction
- Publisher: Simon & Schuster
- Publication date: February 7, 2023
- Publication place: United States
- Media type: Book
- Pages: 336
- ISBN: 978-1982153083

Big Swiss is the third novel by American author Jen Beagin. It was published on February 7, 2023 by Simon & Schuster.

== Premise ==
The novel follows Greta, a 45-year-old woman who has recently moved to Hudson, New York. Residing in a centuries-old dilapidated farmhouse with her friend Sabine, Greta finds work transcribing therapy sessions for a local sex therapist named Om. At night, Greta secretly writes letters to her mother, who died by suicide when Greta was a teenager.

One of Om's clients, whom Greta refers to as "Big Swiss" for her height and Swiss origins, is a 28-year-old gynecologist who has never had an orgasm. Though she was beaten nearly to death years ago, Big Swiss refuses to define herself by her trauma, which fascinates Greta. While at the dog park one day, Greta meets Big Swiss, whose real name is Flavia, and introduces herself under a fake name. The two decide to become "dog park friends," a relationship which quickly turns sexual despite Flavia being married.

== Cover art ==
The book cover was designed by Jaya Miceli and features a painting by Anna Weyant of a woman falling down a flight of stairs. The painting, titled Falling Woman, sold for US$1.62 million at Sotheby’s in New York.

== Reception ==
Big Swiss was positively received by critics, with Bindu Bansinath of The Cut calling it a "refreshingly anti-trauma-plot novel."

Kirkus Reviews called Greta a "wonderfully off-kilter protagonist" and praised Beagin for her "artfully eccentric" writing style. Writing for the Los Angeles Times, Bethanne Patrick wrote that Big Swiss is a "timeless comedy" and "one of the funniest books of the last few years." It was chosen as one of "The 100 Must-Read Books of 2023" by Time.

Big Swiss was nominated for the 2024 Lambda Literary Award for Lesbian Fiction.

== Adaptation ==
Big Swiss has been picked up for a limited television series on HBO. In March 2022, it was announced that Jodie Comer will star in and produce a limited series adaptation of Jen Beagin’s novel Big Swiss for HBO. The project will be produced by A24 and Adam McKay's Hyperobject Industries.
