= Royal Andalusian School of Equestrian Art =

Spanish classical riding academy

Coordinates: 36.69151°N 6.13907°W

- Real Escuela Andaluza del Arte Ecuestre
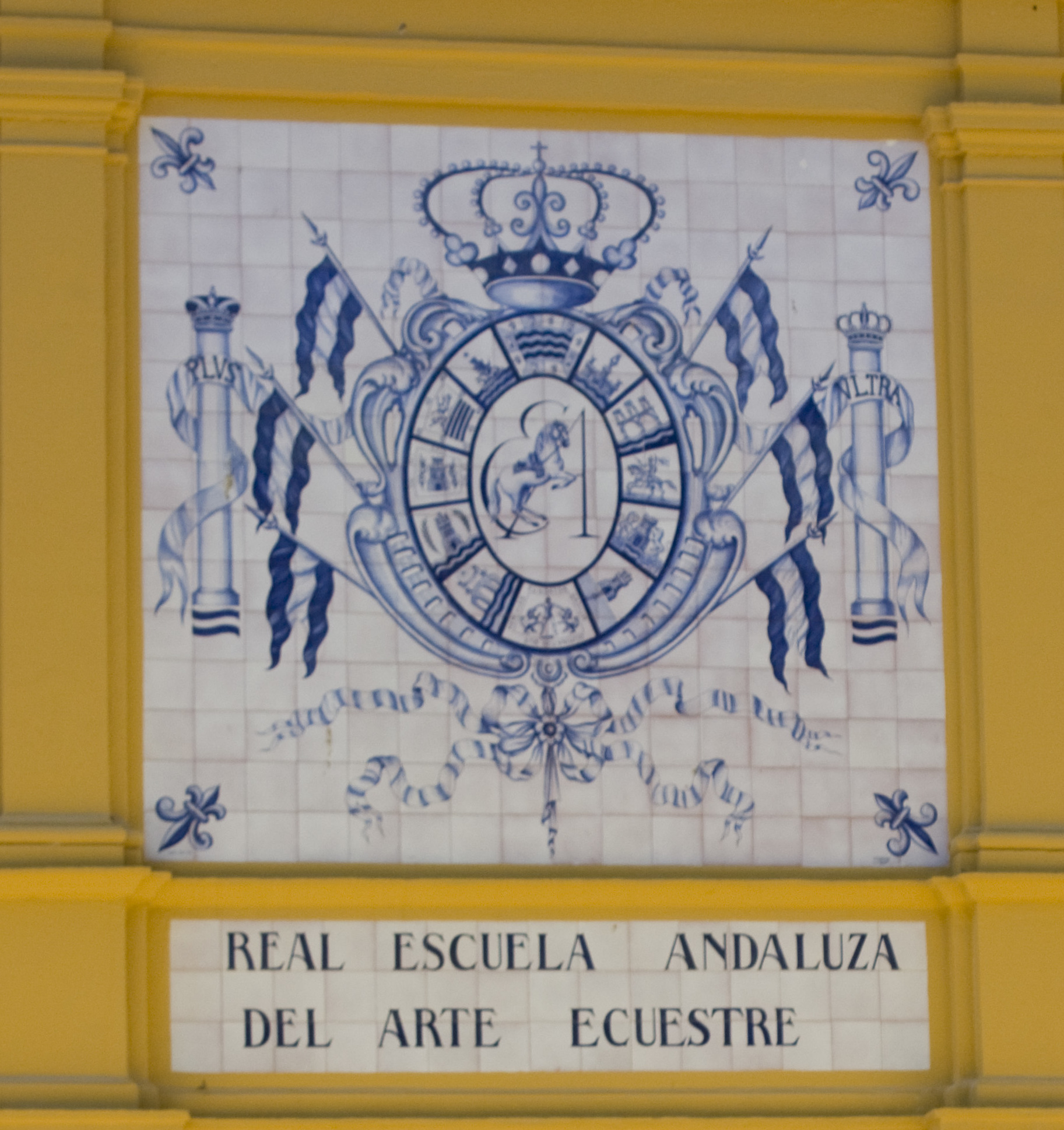
- Founder: Álvaro Domecq Romero
- Location: Jerez de la Frontera, Spain
- Website: www.realescuela.org

The Royal Andalusian School of Equestrian Art (Spanish: Real Escuela Andaluza del Arte Ecuestre) is an institution dedicated to the preservation of the equestrian arts, in the Spanish tradition, based in Jerez de la Frontera, Spain. It is one of the "Big Four", the most prestigious classical riding academies in the world.

== Activities ==
The school is devoted to conserving the ancestral abilities of the Andalusian horse, maintaining the classical traditions of Spanish baroque horsemanship, preparing horses and riders for international dressage competitions, and providing education in all aspects of horsemanship, coachdriving, blacksmithing, the care and breeding of horses, saddlery, and the manufacture and care of horse harness.

The Royal Andalusian School is well known for its "dancing stallions" shows for the tourists, staged in its purpose-built arena designed in 1980 by the Spanish architect José Luis Picardo. The school is adjacent to the historic nineteenth-century Recreo de las Cadenas in Jerez.

== See also ==
Other "Big Four" academies:

- Spanish Riding School
- Escola Portuguesa de Arte Equestre
- Cadre Noir
