= These Ghosts Are Family =

2020 historical fiction novel by Maisy Card

- Author: Maisy Card
- Language: English
- Publisher: Simon & Schuster
- Publication date: July 28, 2020
- Pages: 271
- ISBN: 978-1-982-11743-6

These Ghosts are Family is a historical fiction novel by Maisy Card, published March 3, 2020 by Simon & Schuster.

== Reception ==
These Ghosts are Family received several positive reviews. The New York Times Book Review called it a "rich, ambitious debut novel," and Kirkus Reviews said it was "an intriguing debut with an inventive spin on the generational family saga". Entertainment Weekly, Millions, and LitHub named it the most anticipated book of 2020, and Buzz Magazine named it the Top New Book of the New Decade.

The book has received starred reviews from Booklist and Publishers Weekly, as well as the following accolades:

Award	Category	Result	Ref
Hemingway/PEN Award (2021)	Debut Novel	Shortlist	
Audie Award (2021)	Literary Fiction & Classics	Nominated	
CM Bocas Prize for Caribbean Literature (2021)	Fiction	Shortlist	
Los Angeles Times Book Prize (2020)	First Fiction (Art Seidenbaum Award)	Finalist	
Center for Fiction First Novel Prize (2020)	—	Shortlist	
Booklist Top of the List (2020)	—	—	
Booklist Editors' Choice (2020)	Adult Books	—	
