= Pitchaya Sudbanthad =

Thai writer

Pitchaya Sudbanthad พิชญ สุดบรรทัด
- Education: Duke University (BA); New York University (MBA)
- Occupation: Writer
- Writing career
- Language: Thai, English
- Website: psudbanthad.com

Pitchaya Sudbanthad (Thai: พิชญ สุดบรรทัด; RTGS: Phichon Sutbanthat) is a Thai writer and essayist. His debut novel, Bangkok Wakes to Rain, was selected as a notable book of the year by The New York Times and the Washington Post.

== Biography ==
Pitchaya grew up in Thailand, Saudi Arabia, and the American South. He attended Duke University, graduating with a BA in Environmental Science & Policy in 1998. He later received his MBA from New York University in 2009. In 2015, he received a fellowship for fiction writing from the New York Foundation for the Arts. In 2018, Pitchaya received another fellowship for his fiction from MacDowell. He currently splits his time between Bangkok and Brooklyn.

== Works ==
=== Novels ===
- Bangkok Wakes to Rain, 2019

=== Short stories ===
- "Good Neighbors", 2020
- "Floating", 2019
- "Monsters", 2016
- "Postmark Tomorrow", 2011
- "The Mountains Will Have Vanished", 2005
- "Please, the Dead Shined on Us", 2005
- "Ginnie's Got a Gun", 2004
- "Broken Skin with Water and Dirt", 2003
- "The Beginnings of the World", 2003

=== Essays ===
- "Letter from Brooklyn: Finding Justice in the Streets", Literary Hub, June 2020
- "The Clean Air in Bangkok", Freeman's/Literary Hub, February 2019
- "Spirit Houses", Newsweek, February 2019
- "In the Ring with Rose Baan", CR, Spring, Summer 2019
- "8 Place-Based Novels", Electric Literature, December 2018
- "A Year in Reading", The Millions, December 2018
- "Panang Lasagna", The Morning News, April 2013
- "Of North and South", The Morning News, March 2013
- "Ja Mongkut", The Morning News, February 2013
- "Pad Thai", The Morning News, February 2013
- "Kluay Buat Chee", The Morning News, January 2013
- "Learning to Love Thai-American Food", Gilt Taste, September 2011
- "Bus Bus Riddim", The Morning News, June 2010
- "Pieces of the World", The Morning News, September 2009
- "Bangkok Anew", The Morning News, December 2008
- "AIGA Design Journey: Emory Douglas", AIGA, October, 2008
- "Consuming Obama", The Morning News, November 2006
- "A Walk in the Park: New York", The Morning News, September 2006
- "Field Tested Books: All the King’s Men", Coudal Partners, Summer 2006
- "Focus: Space Invader", RES, March/April 2006
- "Do Right Man", The Morning News, September 2005
- "No Yellow Jerseys Here", The Morning News, July 2005
- "Your Books and Neighbors", The Morning News, January 2005
- "Take from Us the Houses Long Burned", Glowlab, May/June 2005
- "The Brooklyn Pigeon Wars", The Morning News, August 2004
- "Cloaks and Daggers", The Morning News, June 2004
- "Swimming", The Morning News, March 2004
- "Motherless Stadium", The Morning News, February 2004

== Reception ==
Bangkok Wakes to Rain has been received positively by critics. Tash Aw from the Guardian describes the novel as "an exuberant, meticulously-plotted debut." Ploi Pirapokin from Apogee Journal claims that "Subanthad appeals to those native to the city as well as those who have visited."

He has been invited to numerous literary festivals, in both Thailand and the US.
