= Massachusetts Center for the Book =

Massachusetts's affiliate of the Center for the Book in the Library of Congress

The Massachusetts Center for the Book is Massachusetts's affiliate of the Center for the Book in the Library of Congress.

== Mission ==
The Massachusetts Center's mission is to "advance the cause of books and reading and enhance the outreach potential of Massachusetts libraries".

== Massachusetts Book Award ==
The Massachusetts Center recognizes important contemporary work by authors or about Massachusetts subjects with its annual Massachusetts Book Award.

Recipients of the award from 2000 to 2010 have included Eric Carle, Louise Glück, Alice Hoffman, Stanley Kunitz, Dennis Lehane, Moying Li, Lois Lowry, Megan Marshall, Roland Merullo, Nathaniel Philbrick, Jayne Anne Phillips and John Pipkin.

== See also ==
- Books in the United States
