= Álvaro Domecq Romero =

Spanish bullfighter (1940–2025)

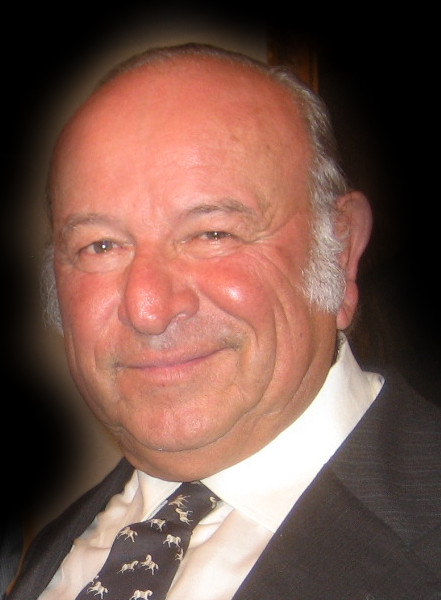
Alvaro Domecq Romero

Álvaro Domecq Romero (8 April 1940 – 18 November 2025) was a Spanish bullfighter and cattle breeder.

== Life and career ==
Domecq Romero was born in Jerez de la Frontera on 8 April 1940, to bullfighter Álvaro Domecq Díez. He made his public debut on 13 September 1959 in the Plaza de Ronda, and made his final appearance on 12 October 1985, in the Plaza de Jerez de la Frontera.

In 1975, he founded the Royal Andalusian School of Equestrian Art.

On 18 November 2025, he died at the age of 85.
