= Tadzio Koelb =

American novelist, translator, and critic

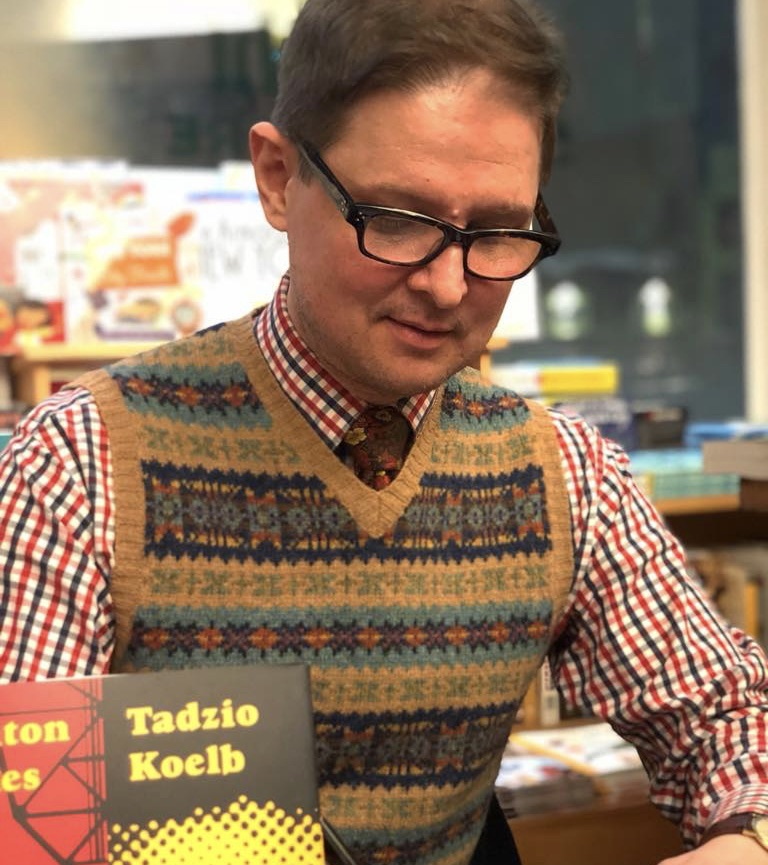
- Born: 1971 (age 54–55); Washington D.C., U.S.
- Education: University of East Anglia
- Occupations: Critic; Novelist; Translator

Tadzio Koelb (English: /taːdʐʉ kœlb/; born 1971) is an American émigré novelist, translator, and critic based in Belgium.

== Career ==
Koelb's first novel, Trenton Makes, appeared in March 2018. It received favorable reviews in the New York Times Book Review and the Financial Times. The Center for Fiction shortlisted the novel for the 2018 Center for Fiction First Novel Prize. The French translation of the novel was long listed for the Grand Prix de Littérature Américaine and shortlisted for the Prix du roman PAGE.

In addition to fiction, Koelb has published criticism and reviews on literature and the arts in a wide variety of publications on both sides of the Atlantic, including the New York Times, the New Statesman, The Guardian, Art in America, and the Times Literary Supplement. His short critical biography of Lawrence Durrell appeared as part of Scribner's Sons British Writers series, edited by Jay Parini. In 2015 Koelb published Morasses, a translation of André Gide’s novel Paludes.

== Biography ==
Born in Washington, D.C., Koelb grew up in Brooklyn until the age of 12, when his family moved to Brussels, Belgium. He studied painting in Paris, France, and Barcelona, Spain, before earning his Master's in creative writing from the University of East Anglia in the UK. Traveling with his wife, a public health specialist and midwife, he has lived in a number of other countries, including Uzbekistan, Tunisia, Rwanda, and Madagascar. In 2016, he served as a campaign writer for Misty K. Snow, the first transgender candidate for the US Senate.

== Bibliography ==
- British writers. Retrospective supplement, Charles Scribner's Sons, 2002 ISBN 9780684315997
- Morasses, Calypso Editions, 2015 ISBN 0988790386
- Trenton Makes, Doubleday, 2018 ISBN 0385543387
