= Kirstin Valdez Quade =

American writer

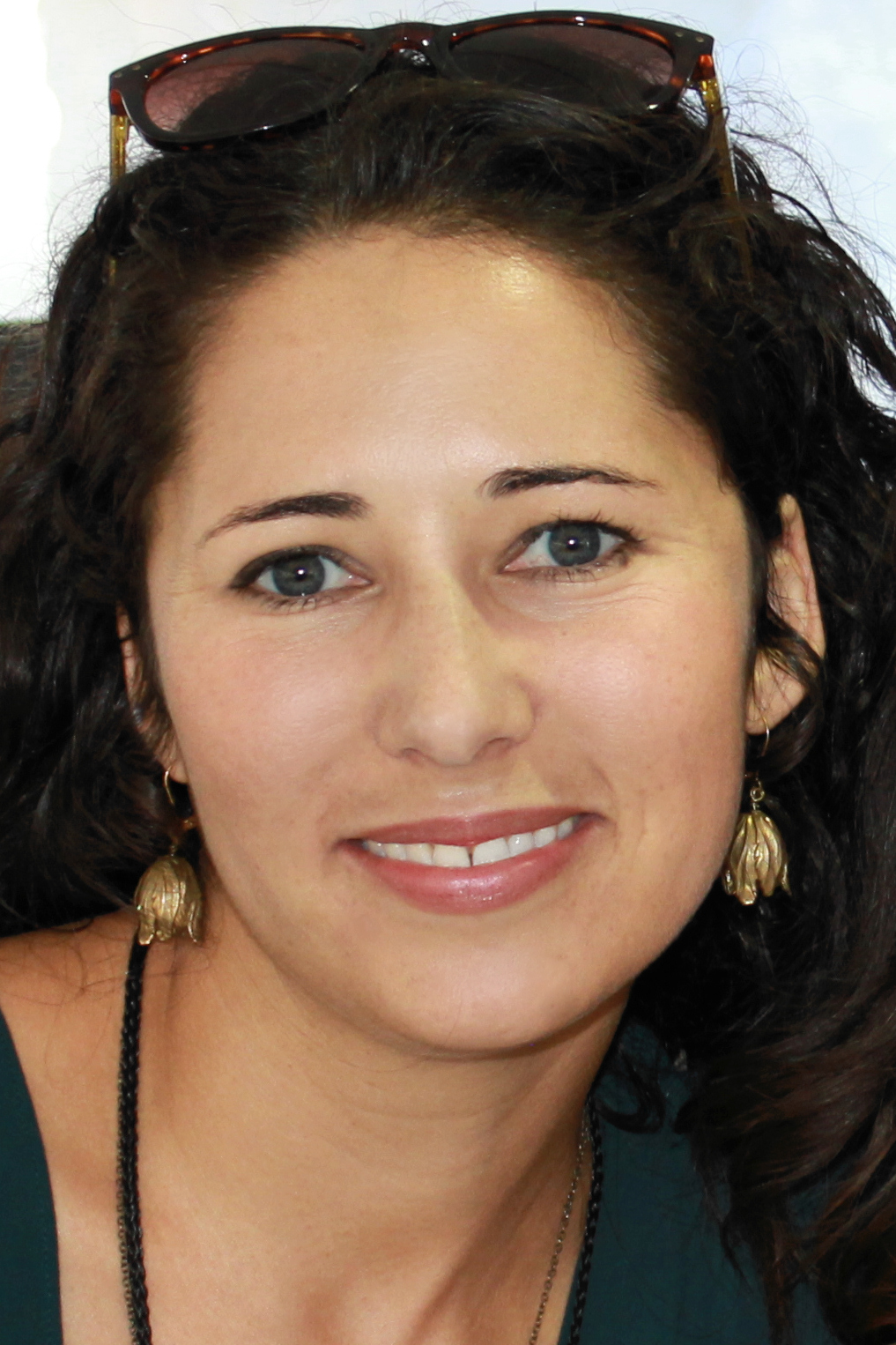
- Quade at 2015 Texas Book Festival
- Born: Albuquerque, New Mexico, U.S.
- Citizenship: American
- Education: Phillips Exeter Academy; Stanford University (BA); University of Oregon (MFA)
- Occupations: Writer, professor
- Writing career
- Language: English
- Years active: 2009—present
- Genres: Fiction, short story
- Website: kirstinvaldezquade.com

Kirstin Valdez Quade is an American writer.

== Early life and education ==
Quade was born to a white father and a Hispanic mother in Albuquerque, New Mexico. Her father Jay Quade was a desert geologist and her family lived throughout the Southwestern United States as well as in Australia. She attended Phillips Exeter Academy and earned her BA from Stanford University and her MFA from the University of Oregon. From 2009 to 2011 she was a Wallace Stegner Fellow in the Creative Writing Program at Stanford University, where she also taught as a Jones Lecturer. In 2014–15, she was the Delbanco Visiting professor of Creative Writing at the University of Michigan. She is currently an assistant professor of creative writing at Princeton University and will be returning to Stanford University in the Fall 2023.

== Career ==
Quade's work has appeared in The New Yorker, Narrative Magazine, The Best American Short Stories, The O. Henry Prize Stories, and elsewhere. Her writing weaves together themes of family, race, class, and coming-of-age, and unfold in New Mexico landscapes inspired by the author's own upbringing.

Her debut short story collection, Night at the Fiestas, received critical praise and won awards. A review in The New York Times labeled her stories "legitimate masterpieces" and called the book a "haunting and beautiful debut story collection." The Five Wounds, her debut novel, was published in 2021. The novel was shortlisted for the 2022 Andrew Carnegie Medal for Excellence in Fiction. She was a 2021 James Merrill Fellow in Stonington, Connecticut.

== Awards and honors ==
=== Literary awards ===
Year	Work	Award		Result	Ref
2013	—	Rona Jaffe Foundation Writers' Award	—	Won	
2013	"Nemecia"	Narrative Prize	—	Won	
2014	"Nemecia"	PEN/O. Henry Stories	—	Won	
2014	Night at the Fiestas	National Book Foundation	"5 Under 35 Award"	Won	
2015	Night at the Fiestas	National Book Critics Circle Award	John Leonard Prize	Won	
2015	Night at the Fiestas	Southwest Books of the Year	—	Top Picks	
2016	Night at the Fiestas	Sue Kaufman Prize for First Fiction	—	Won	
2016	Night at the Fiestas	Young Lions Fiction Award	—	Shortlisted	
2021	The Five Wounds	Center for Fiction First Novel Prize	—	Won	
2022	The Five Wounds	Andrew Carnegie Medals for Excellence	Fiction	Shortlisted	
2022	The Five Wounds	Aspen Words Literary Prize	—	Shortlisted	
2022	The Five Wounds	BookTube Prize	Fiction	Shortlisted	
2022	The Five Wounds	Lambda Literary Award	Lesbian Fiction	Shortlisted	
2022	The Five Wounds	Mark Twain American Voice in Literature Award	—	Shortlisted	
2022	The Five Wounds	Maya Angelou Book Award	—	Shortlisted	
2022	The Five Wounds	Rosenthal Family Foundation Award	—	Nominated	
2022	The Five Wounds	VCU Cabell First Novelist Award	—	Shortlisted	

=== Honors ===
- 2009–2011 Wallace Stegner Fellow
- 2021 James Merrill Fellow

== Bibliography ==
- —— (2015). Night at the Fiestas: Stories. New York: W. W. Norton & Company. ISBN 978-0-393-24298-0.
- —— (2021). The Five Wounds: A Novel. New York: W. W. Norton & Company. ISBN 978-0-393-24283-6.
