= Shubha Sunder =

Indian writer

Shubha Sunder is an Indian writer. She is the author of the short story collection Boomtown Girl and the novel Optional Practical Training. In 2025, she was awarded a Whiting Award.

== Early life and education ==
Having been born and raised in Bangalore, India, Sunder moved to the United States to attend Bryn Mawr College, where she began to seriously consider the possibility of becoming a fiction writer. She graduated with a major in physics and a minor in creative writing. Afterward, she attended the Boston University MFA in Creative Writing program.

== Career ==
In 2016, Sunder received a Massachusetts Cultural Council Fellowship. In 2020, Sunder received an Artist Fellowship Award from the city of Boston, Massachusetts.

In 2021, Sunder published her debut short story collection, Boomtown Girl. It won the St. Lawrence Book Award and was a finalist for the Flannery O'Connor Short Story Award and the New American Press' Fiction Prize. Afterward, she wrote Optional Practical Training during the COVID-19 pandemic and in wake of divorce, which she published in 2025 with Graywolf Press. Publishers Weekly gave it a starred review and called it a "knockout."

Sunder teaches at the Massachusetts College of Art and Design. She has also taught math and science at the high school level in Boston.
