= Mischa Berlinski =

American author (born 1973)

Mischa Berlinski (born 1973 in New York, United States) is an American author. His first novel, Fieldwork, was a finalist for the 2007 National Book Award. In 2008 Berlinski won a $50,000 Whiting Award, given to writers showing early promise in their careers.

== Life ==
Berlinski is the son of author and academic David Berlinski and cellist Toby Saks, the grandson of composer and musicologist Herman Berlinski, and the brother of journalist Claire Berlinski.

Berlinski is a UC Berkeley graduate, and has worked as a journalist in Thailand.

== Awards ==
- 2007 National Book Award Fiction Finalist
- 2008 Whiting Award
- 2013 American Academy of Arts and Letters’ Addison M. Metcalf Award

== Works ==
=== Books ===
- Mona Acts Out (Norton, Liveright) 2025
- Peacekeeping (Sarah Crichton Books) 2016
- Fieldwork (Farrar, Straus & Giroux) 2007

=== Articles ===
- "Woman Marries Snake". Harper's. November 2007.
- "Into the Zombie Underworld". Men's Journal. September 2009. (Reprinted online by Epic Magazine)

== Reviews ==
Stephen King reviewed Fieldwork for Entertainment Weekly. While King lauds the novel's complexity, "narrative voice full of humor and sadness," and suspense, he criticizes the book's publisher, Farrar, Straus and Giroux, for poor marketing choices:

Why, why, why would a company publish a book this good and then practically demand that people not read it? Why should this book go to waste? Is it because there are people in publishing who believe that readers who liked The Memory Keeper's Daughter are too dumb to enjoy a killer novel like Fieldwork? If so, shame on them for their elitism.

— Stephen King, Entertainment Weekly, April 15, 2007

King's review resulted in increased sales of Fieldwork. When Berlinski won the Whiting Award, he attributed it to his "luck" that "Stephen King, the most famous writer in the world, picked up my book because he didn't like the cover."

In 2007, The New York Review of Books published a positive review of Fieldwork from Hilary Mantel:

Early in Mischa Berlinski's gripping and entertaining first novel there is a piece of postmodern skittishness which points to a truth that novelists shy away from: their trade embarrasses them. When you first start making things up, you expect that someone is going to tell you to stop.

— Hilary Mantel, The New York Review of Books, July 19, 2007
