= Y/N =

2023 book by Esther Yi

- Author: Esther Yi
- Audio read by: Greta Jung
- Illustrator: Richard Oriolo (design)
- Language: English
- Genre: Absurdist fiction
- Set in: Seoul
- Publisher: Astra House
- Publication date: March 21, 2023
- Publication place: United States
- Pages: 224
- ISBN: 9781662601538 (1st hardcover ed.)
- OCLC: 1317841467
- Dewey Decimal: 813.6
- LC Class: PS3626 .14 Y6 2023

Y/N is a 2023 novel by Esther Yi about a Korean American author of self-insert fanfiction in Berlin who flies to Seoul to find the K-pop idol Moon, whom she is obsessed with, after he abruptly retires and disappears. This is Yi's debut novel, published on March 21, 2023, by Astra House.

== Plot summary ==
In Berlin, the Korean American narrator works as a copywriter for a business selling canned artichoke hearts and has a boyfriend, Masterson, an academic. Her flatmate Vavra offers her a spare ticket to a concert of a K-pop boy band, and after attending, the narrator falls in love with the youngest member, Moon. She begins posting self-insert fanfiction of him online, and following his sudden retirement and disappearance, flies to Seoul to find him. In Seoul, shoe-factory worker O approaches her, surprised to find a stranger wearing soles she had created, and secretly enters the narrator into a lottery. The narrator wins a trip to Polygon Plaza, the headquarters of the boy band's company, and is driven to a gated compound outside the city, where she meets Moon, her Idol.

== Themes ==
The novel explores "the precarity of love, and how the modern self is forged less in community than in mass consumption." Yi stated that practicality is a question throughout the novel. She also expressed that Y/N was not intended to be a criticism of K-pop or celebrity culture, but that she was curious about that form of worship.

Kirkus Reviews said that Y/N uses pop music to make a larger argument about art and literature.

== Reception ==
Nina Allan, writing for The Guardian, said the novel seems like a "zeitgeisty narrative of parasocial relationships" but that it alludes to the myths of Narcissus and Pygmalion where "obsessive love is more revealing of the lover than of the beloved." Allan concluded that Y/N is a "curious, cerebral work, shot through with moments of tender poetry and a vertiginous self-awareness." Alexandra Jacobs of The New York Times described the novel as an adult The Phantom Tollbooth, citing the plot which "floats in and out of surreality" and its "corkscrew turns of language." In a starred review, Publishers Weekly praised Yi's "distinctive voice and lush prose" in illustrating the narrator's obsession, which "verges on religious devotion."

Cat Zhang of Vulture contrasted Y/N to mainstream Western writing about K-pop, stating that rather than justifying why fans become obsessed, it "throws readers down the hole of obsession in all its fevered absurdity."

The Harvard Crimson rated the book three stars, stating that the novel "finds itself incompatible with the stark instantaneity of Yi's prose" and "[tries] to do too much."

Cosmopolitan listed Y/N as one of the 30 best books of 2023 so far as of April. Time also listed the novel as one of the 100 must-read books of 2023.

== Awards ==
Y/N was shortlisted for the 2023 Center for Fiction First Novel Prize.
