= Jen Beagin =

American novelist and writer

- Born: 1971 (age 54–55)
- Education: University of Massachusetts Boston; University of California, Irvine (MFA)
- Occupations: Novelist; writer
- Writing career
- Genres: Fiction; essays
- Notable works: Big Swiss; Vacuum in the Dark; Pretend I'm Dead
- Notable awards: Whiting Award

Jen Beagin (born 1971) is an American novelist and writer.

== Life and career ==
=== Early life and education ===
Beagin grew up in Torrance, California, and moved to Lowell, Massachusetts, in her youth. She returned to college in her mid-30s, and attended the University of Massachusetts Boston. She earned an MFA in Writing from the University of California, Irvine.

=== Professional life ===
Among other jobs, Beagin was a long time housecleaner. This inspired the character of Mona, who is the housecleaner protagonist of her first two books. Additionally, like the character Greta in the novel Big Swiss, Beagin also transcribed therapy sessions briefly.

== Published works ==
=== Pretend I'm Dead (2015) ===
Pretend I'm Dead, her first novel, received a starred review from Kirkus Reviews, which also noted it among the best fiction of 2018. Pretend I'm Dead was shortlisted for the Center for Fiction First Novel Prize. The website Emily Books gave an early positive review of the book, the first edition of which was published by Northwestern University Press in 2015. The novel was reissued as a hardcover in 2018 by Simon & Schuster.

=== Vacuum in the Dark (2019) ===
Vacuum in the Dark, a sequel to Pretend I'm Dead, received a starred Kirkus review and was named a best book for February 2019 by Oprah Magazine. Publishers Weekly gave it a starred review, calling it "a sharp and superb novel" that "pulls no punches—this novel is viciously smart and morbidly funny."

=== Big Swiss (2023) ===
Big Swiss concerns a woman who, while transcribing sex therapy sessions, falls for a client named Flavia, the titular "Big Swiss".

Publishers Weekly Tip Sheet noted: "This unconventional love story has a surplus of appeal from page one."

== Critical reception ==
Entertainment Weekly said: "Beagin stands out among fiction's fresh crop of promising voices." NPR Books said that "Beagin is a wonderfully funny writer who also happens to tackle serious subjects."

== Awards and nominations ==
Year	Nominated work	Award	Category	Result	Ref.
2017	Pretend I'm Dead	Whiting Award	Fiction	Winner	
2018	Pretend I'm Dead	Center for Fiction First Novel Prize	—	Shortlisted	
2019	Vacuum in the Dark	Bollinger Everyman Wodehouse Prize	—	Shortlisted	

== Publications ==
=== Novels ===
- — (2018). Pretend I'm Dead. Simon & Schuster. ISBN 978-1501183935.
- — (2019). Vacuum in the Dark. Simon & Schuster. ISBN 978-1501182143.
- — (2023). Big Swiss. Simon & Schuster. ISBN 978-1982153083.

=== Short fiction ===
- — (November 5, 2013). "The Blind Pig". Juked. No. 11.

=== Essays ===
- — (May 16, 2018), "Bees", PowellsBooks.Blog, archived from the original on 19 May 2018
- — (February 28, 2019), "On Dogs and the Unique Hell of Writing Novels", Publishers Weekly
