= Pretend I'm Dead =

2018 novel by Jen Beagin

- Cover of 2018 hardcover.
- Author: Jen Beagin
- Audio read by: Candace Thaxton
- Cover artist: Alex Merto
- Language: English
- Genre: Dark Humor
- Published: 2018
- Publisher: Northwestern University Press, Simon & Schuster
- Publication date: 2015
- Pages: 240 (2nd ed)
- ISBN: 978-1501183935
- Followed by: Vacuum in the Dark

Pretend I'm Dead is the first novel published by writer Jen Beagin. It was followed by a sequel novel titled Vacuum in the Dark.

The title was originally published as a paperback by NU Press, and has since been published in the UK with new book cover art.

With a new cover designed by Alex Merto, the novel was reissued as a hardcover in 2018 by Simon & Schuster.

2015 cover, NU Press

UK Cover, Oneworld Publications

== Reception ==
In Kirkus Reviews, the novel received a starred review and was listed on Kirkus' Best Debut Fiction of 2018.

"What gives this novel its heart is Beagin’s capacity for seeing: As Mona cleans peoples’ homes, we learn that the wealthy, well-dressed, superior individuals who pay her to scrub their toilets are just as messed up as the addicts and prostitutes and gamblers she encounters outside of work. This is not a new theme, of course, but Beagin makes it fresh with her sly, funny, compassionate voice. This is a terrific debut. Singularly enjoyable." Kirkus Review

Emily Books gave an early positive review of the first edition of Pretend I’m Dead, published in 2015 as a paperback by Northwestern University Press.

Pretend I’m Dead was shortlisted for The Center for Fiction's 2018 First Novel Prize.

== See also ==
=== Excerpts ===
- "Yoko and Yoko" excerpt from Pretend I'm Dead (2016)
- Excerpt from "Hole" in Pretend I'm Dead (2015)
