= The Good Thief (novel) =

- Author: Hannah Tinti
- Language: English
- Genre: Fiction
- Published: 2009
- Publisher: Dial Press
- Publication place: United States

The Good Thief, by Hannah Tinti, is a debut novel published in 2009 by Dial Press. It is the story of Ren, an orphan adopted by a pair of gentleman rogues in early American New England and led willingly into a life of crime. Ren, who is missing his left hand, is taught to lie, steal and run confidence games by his new mentor, Benjamin Nab, and they travel to the city of North Umbridge, where a mousetrap factory owner reigns supreme using his army of hired thugs ("hat boys") and the unmarried, dowdy girls who work in the factory ("mousetrap girls").

The Good Thief is the winner of the American Library Association's Alex Award and the Center for Fiction's John Sargent Sr. First Novel Prize.

== Reception ==
The Good Thief received positive reviews from Publishers Weekly, The Washington Post, Entertainment Weekly, the San Francisco Chronicle, The Seattle Times, and The New York Times, as well as starred reviews from Booklist and Kirkus Reviews. The book also received the following accolades:

Year	Award	Category	Result	Ref
2008	John Sargent Sr. First Novel Prize	—	Won	
2009	Alex Award	—	Won	
