= Lea Carpenter =

American writer and editor

- Education: Princeton University; Harvard University
- Relatives: Éleuthère Irénée du Pont
- Writing career
- Genres: Fiction

Lea du Pont Carpenter Ackerman is an American writer and editor. Her debut novel, Eleven Days (2013), was well received by critics.

== Early life and education ==
Carpenter grew up in Wilmington, Delaware. She is a descendant of the French-American chemist Éleuthère Irénée du Pont. She is one of six children born to Carroll M. Carpenter and Edmund N. Carpenter II. Her father was a partner and former president of Richards, Layton and Finger, a law firm. He was also awarded a Bronze Star in World War II. Edmund Carpenter served in the Army Intelligence in China and Burma in World War II. This information, revealed after his death, inspired Lea Carpenter to write her first novel.

Carpenter graduated summa cum laude from Princeton University with a degree in English. She received her MBA from Harvard University in June 2003.

== Career ==
Carpenter worked in literary publishing for ten years. She was a founding editor of Francis Ford Coppola's literary magazine, Zoetrope, and worked on John F. Kennedy Jr.'s George magazine. From 2004 to 2005, Carpenter was the deputy publisher of The Paris Review. During this time Carpenter supervised the "day-to-day financial health" of the magazine, and worked under the magazine's publisher, Drue Heinz. Carpenter was also the managing editor of Lipper/Atlas publishers, and was the founding editor for the Penguin Lives series.

As of 2013, Carpenter was employed at the New York Public Library. She founded the Young Lions, which is a group for young adults in New York who want to contribute to the library. Since 1999, the group has raised $5 million for the library.

Carpenter is on the board of directors for the Art Production Fund. The non-profit organization is dedicated to "commissioning and producing ambitious public art projects, reaching new audiences and expanding awareness through contemporary art."

In addition to authoring three novels, she is also the co-writer of the film Mile 22 which was directed by Peter Berg.

=== Eleven Days ===
Eleven Days tells the story of a single mother and her son. Instead of applying to Harvard, the son enters the Naval Academy. Ten years later, he is reported missing from a Special Operations Forces mission on the same night as the Osama bin Laden raid.

Carpenter began to write her novel on a dare from a friend who said: "Give me ten thousand words" by May 3, 2011. The title of the book refers to the end of The Iliad.

Carpenter's first novel, Eleven Days, was praised by critics and writers. Toni Morrison commented that the book contained "elegant prose." Former Senator and Navy Seal, Bob Kerrey said the book, "showed us how 9/11 has changed our lives forever." It has also been referred to as, "[a]mong the smartest of the batch of recent American war novels." The novel was longlisted for the Bailey's Prize for Fiction 2014.

=== Red, White, Blue ===
Published in 2018 and called "the perfect spy novel for the post–9/11 era," by author and former officer of the U.S. Marine Corps, Phil Klay, Red, White, Blue is a literary novel of espionage.

=== Ilium ===
Carpenter's third literary spy novel, published in 2024, explores what it means to by led by love into leading a double life, and the discovery that you have been an asset in a long-planned CIA-Mossad operation.

== Personal life ==
Carpenter lives in Manhattan with her two sons and husband, the writer Elliot Ackerman.
