= Álvaro Domecq y Díez =

Spanish noble (1917–2005)

- Born: Álvaro Domecq y Díez; 1 July 1917; Jerez, Spain
- Died: 5 October 2005 (aged 88)

Don Álvaro Domecq y Díez (1 July 1917 – 5 October 2005) was born into an aristocratic Spanish sherry family in Jerez, of Cádiz, a province of Andalucia in southwestern Spain.

He distinguished himself as a fighter pilot in the Spanish Civil War on the Nationalist's side, and later re-introduced bullfighting on horseback to Spain. Domecq further developed bull breeding and presided as patriarch over a bullfighting dynasty.

== Life ==
Álvaro Domecq y Díez was born in Jerez on 1 July 1917. His mother died in a riding accident when he was four years old, and Álvaro was educated by Jesuits in Madrid. After the fall of the monarchy, he travelled to Bordeaux and Estremoz in Portugal where he studied law. But any plans for a legal career were curtailed by the 1936–39 Civil War. He married María Josefa Romero in 1938.

=== British and Irish links ===
In 1725, an Irishman, Patrick Murphy, had set up the sherry company that the Domecqs, then a minor French noble family, inherited in 1822. The London firm of Matthew Clark and Sons handled imports to Britain for many years. Pedro Domecq produced brandy and sherry until 1994, when the family was bought out and Pedro Domecq became part of the UK-based Allied Domecq.

In 1930, Álvaro's father took over a large estate that had belonged to the Duke of Veragua, marking the beginning of the family's relationship with the fiesta nacional, the bullfight.

== Career ==
When his father died in 1937, 20-year-old Domecq started work in the family's bodegas (cellars), becoming managing director of the company.

=== Bullfighting ===
In 1934, before the war, he debuted at 17 as a bullfighter in Santander. He is deemed by most to have revived the then almost moribund form of bullfighting known as rejoneo, or horseback bullfighting. Rejoneador ("lancer") is the name given to a bullfighter who fights the bull on horseback. Along with the picador, a rejoneador is the second type of mounted bullfighter in Spanish bullfighting.

In the 1943 season, Domecq participated in more than 50 corridas, being feted in Portugal and as far afield as Mexico for his horsemanship, donating all his fees to charity. He retired from the bullring in 1950, a year after witnessing the goring and death of his close friend Manolete at Linares. His son Álvaro and later, grandson Luis followed in the ring.

He established himself as a leading bull breeder of "toros bravos" bulls and pioneered artificial insemination to improve their stock. His book El Toro Bravo is still a textbook on the subject.

He later demonstrated his loyalty to Francoist Spain by serving as mayor of Jerez de la Frontera, from 1952 until 1957 and president of the provincial government of Cadiz from 1957 until 1967, when he became a deputy in the Cortes.

== "Curse" ==
Of his 19 children, only two, Álvaro and Fabiola, survived to adulthood. Fourteen died as a consequence of their mother's Rhesus negative blood. A girl died during a blood transfusion, a boy died of dysentery at four months and another died, aged six, in a riding accident.

In 1991, four of his grandchildren were killed in a car accident. Some attribute these unfortunate events to the "Domecq Curse".
