= Marquess of Oquendo =

Marquessate of Oquendo
- Creation date: 3 April 1889
- Created by: Alfonso XIII
- Peerage: Peerage of Spain
- First holder: José María Narváez y Porcel, 1st Marquess of Oquendo
- Present holder: Luis Narváez y Rojas, 5th Marquess of Oquendo

Marquess of Oquendo (Spanish: Marqués de Oquendo) is a hereditary title in the Peerage of Spain, granted in 1889 by Queen María Cristina in the name of his son Alfonso XIII to José María Narváez, 2nd Duke of Valencia and the nephew of Ramón María Narváez, 1st Duke of Valencia. The name refers to Antonio de Oquendo, an ancestor of the 1st Marquess.

== Marquesses of Oquendo ==
1. José María Narváez y Porcel, 1st Marquess of Oquendo
2. Ramón María Narváez y del Águila, 2nd Marquess of Oquendo
3. Luis María Narváez y Ulloa, 3rd Marquess of Oquendo
4. Ramón María Narváez y Coello de Portugal 4th Marquess of Oquendo
5. Luis Narváez y Rojas, 5th Marquess of Oquendo

== See also ==
- Ramón María Narváez, 1st Duke of Valencia
