= Marquess of Casa Domecq =

Hereditary title

Marquessate of Casa Domecq
- Creation date: 13 March 1906
- Created by: Pope Pius X
- Peerage: Peerage of the Vatican
- First holder: Pedro Domecq y Núñez de Villavicencio, 1st Marquess of Casa Domecq
- Present holder: Pedro Domecq y Gandarias, 4th Marquess of Casa Domecq

Marquess of Casa Domecq (Spanish: Marqués de Casa Domecq) is a hereditary title in the peerage of the Vatican granted in 1906 by Pope Pius X to Pedro Domecq, an important Spanish businessman and promoter of the Sherry market in Jérez de la Frontera. The title was granted usage in Spain and the peerage of Spain in June 1906.

== Marquesses of Casa Domecq (1906) ==
- Pedro Domecq y Núñez de Villavicencio, 1st Marquess of Casa Domecq
- Pedro Domecq y del Rivero, 2nd Marquess of Casa Domecq
- Pedro Domecq e Hidalgo, 3rd Marquess of Casa Domecq
- Pedro Domecq y Gandarias, 4th Marquess of Casa Domecq

== See also ==
- Viscount of Almocadén
- Palacio del Marqués de Montana
