= Eleven Days (novel) =

2013 novel by Lea Carpenter

- First edition
- Author: Lea Carpenter
- Language: English
- Publisher: Knopf Publishing Group
- Publication date: 2013
- Publication place: United States
- Media type: Print
- Pages: 270 pp
- ISBN: 9780307960702

Eleven Days is the first novel written by Lea Carpenter. It was published in 2013.

The novel is about a mother's bond with her son; about life choices; about the military, war, and service to one's country. The story is narrated by a woman named Sara whose son Jason is a member of the Special Operations Force in the Navy SEALs. Her son is subsequently deemed missing after a fictional raid on May 2, 2011, the night that Osama Bin Ladin had been killed. Sara is thus left in limbo, waiting to hear about the whereabouts of her missing son.

== Plot summary ==
Sara's son Jason is missing from a Special Operations Forces mission undertaken on the same night as the Bin Laden raid. As Sara waits for news, in a series of flashbacks we learn about Jason's absentee father, while through letters home from his training and early missions, we get a picture of Jason as a strong, compassionate leader who is wise beyond his years and modest about his abilities. Those exceptional abilities give Jason the chance to participate in a wholly different level of assignment, the most important and dangerous of his career.
