= Brianda Domecq =

Spanish-Mexican novelist

Brianda Domecq (born New York City, August 1, 1942) is a Spanish-Mexican novelist. She was born to a Spanish father (Pedro Domecq González) and American mother (Elizabeth Cook), and learned Spanish as a child when her family moved to Mexico for business. She currently resides in México In a senior citizen's residence

== Works ==
- Once días y algo más 1979
- Bestiario Doméstico 1982
- Voces y rostros del Bravo 1988
- Acechando Al Unicorno (Stalking the Unicorn): La Virginidad En La Literatura Mexicana (Virginity in Mexican Literature 1988
- La insólita historia de la Santa de Cabora 1990
- BD/De cuerpo entero 1991
- Mujer que publica, mujer pública 1994
- A través de los ojos de ella (dos tomos) 1999
- Un día fui caballo 2000
- Once dias... y algo mas, English edition Eleven Days - autobiographical account of a kidnapping 1995
