= Lambda Literary Award for Lesbian Fiction =

Annual literary award

- Awarded for: Literary award
- Sponsored by: Lambda Literary Foundation
- Date: Annual

The Lambda Literary Award for Lesbian Fiction is an annual literary award, presented by the Lambda Literary Foundation to a work of fiction on lesbian themes. As the award is presented based on themes in the work, not the sexuality or gender of the writer, men and heterosexual women may also be nominated for or win the award.

== Recipients ==
Lambda Literary Award for Lesbian Fiction winners and finalists
Year	Author	Title	Result	Ref.
1989	Dorothy Allison	Trash: Short Stories	Winner	
1989	Sarah Schulman	After Delores	Finalist	
1989	Rita Mae Brown	Bingo	Finalist	
1989	Jan Clausen	The Prosperine Papers	Finalist	
1989	Camarin Grae	The Secret in the Bird	Finalist	
1990	Nisa Donnelly	The Bar Stories: A Novel After All	Winner	
1990	Jane Rule	After the Fire	Finalist	
1990	May Sarton	Education of Harriet Hatfield	Finalist	
1990	Shay Youngblood	The Big Mama Stories	Finalist	
1990	Valerie Miner	Trespassing and Other Stories	Finalist	
1991	Paula Martinac	Out of Time	Winner	
1991	Jane DeLynn	Don Juan in the Village	Finalist	
1991	Anna Livia	Incidents Involving Mirth	Finalist	
1991	Melanie Kaye/Kantrowitz	My Jewish Face	Finalist	
1991	Sarah Schulman	People in Trouble	Finalist	
1992	Jewelle Gomez	The Gilda Stories	Winner (tie)	
1992	Blanche McCrary Boyd	The Revolution of Little Girls	Winner (tie)	
1992	Diane Salvatore	Benediction	Finalist	
1992	Judith McDaniel	Just Say Yes	Finalist	
1992	Anna Livia	Minimax	Finalist	
1993	Judith Katz	Running Fiercely Toward a High Thin Sound	Winner	
1993	Carol Anshaw	Aquamarine	Finalist	
1993	Sarah Schulman	Empathy	Finalist	
1993	Madelyn Arnold	On Ships at Sea	Finalist	
1993	Rebecca Brown	Terrible Girls	Finalist	
1994	Jeanette Winterson	Written on the Body	Winner	
1994	Paula Martinac	Home Movies	Finalist	
1994	Jenifer Levin	Sea of Light	Finalist	
1994	Leslie Feinberg	Stone Butch Blues	Finalist	
1994	Joan Nestle and Naomi Holoch	Women on Women 2	Finalist	
1995	Rebecca Brown	The Gifts of the Body	Winner	
1995	Eileen Myles	Chelsea Girls	Finalist	
1995	Heather Lewis	House Rules	Finalist	
1995	Emma Donoghue	Sir Fry	Finalist	
1995	Ellen Galford	The Dyke and the Dybbuk	Finalist	
1996	Jacqueline Woodson	Autobiography of a Family Photo	Winner	
1996	Louise Blum	Amnesty	Finalist	
1996	Stephanie Grant	Passion of Alice	Finalist	
1996	Sarah Schulman	Rat Bohemia	Finalist	
1996	Lucy Jane Bledsoe	Sweat	Finalist	
1997	Achy Obejas	Memory Mambo	Winner	
1997	Barbara Wilson	If You Had a Family	Finalist	
1997	Carol Anshaw	Seven Moves	Finalist	
1997	Sarah Van Arsdale	Toward Amnesia	Finalist	
1997	Rebecca Brown	What Keeps Me Here	Finalist	
1998	Elana Dykewomon	Beyond the Pale	Winner	
1998	Frankie Hucklenbroich	A Crystal Diary	Finalist	
1998	Ruthann Robson	A/K/A	Finalist	
1998	Persimmon Blackbridge	Prozac Highway	Finalist	
1998	Blanche McCrary Boyd	Terminal Velocity	Finalist	
1999	Dorothy Allison	Cavedweller	Winner	
1999	Sarah Schulman	Shimmer	Finalist	
1999	Sharon Bridgforth	the bull-jean stories	Finalist	
1999	Rebecca Brown	The Dogs	Finalist	
1999	Erika Lopez	They Call Me Mad Dog	Finalist	
2000	Sarah Waters	Tipping the Velvet	Winner	
2000	Anna Livia	Bruised Fruit	Finalist	
2000	Barbara Wilson	Salt Water and Other Stories	Finalist	
2000	Terri de la Peña	Faults	Finalist	
2000	Elizabeth Stark	Shy Girl	Finalist	
2001	Michelle Tea	Valencia	Winner	
2001	Sarah Waters	Affinity	Finalist	
2001	Shay Youngblood	Black Girl in Paris	Finalist	
2001	Stacey D'Erasmo	Tea	Finalist	
2001	Jeanette Winterson	The Powerbook	Finalist	
2002	Achy Obejas	Days of Awe	Winner	
2002	Erika Lopez	Hoochie Mama: The Other White Meat	Finalist	
2002	Ann Wadsworth	Light, Coming Back	Finalist	
2002	Sylvia Brownrigg	Pages for You	Finalist	
2002	Alexandra Grilikhes	Yin Fire	Finalist	
2003	Sarah Waters	Fingersmith	Winner	
2003	Lynn Breedlove	Godspeed	Finalist	
2003	Carol Anshaw	Lucky in the Corner	Finalist	
2003	Nicola Griffith	Stay	Finalist	
2003	Lydia Kwa	This Place Called Absence	Finalist	
2004	Nina Revoyr	Southland	Winner	
2004	Susan J. Leonardi	And Then They Were Nuns	Finalist	
2004	Ann-Marie MacDonald	The Way the Crow Flies	Finalist	
2004	Lucy Jane Bledsoe	This Wild Silence	Finalist	
2004	Carla Trujillo	What Night Brings	Finalist	
2005	Stacey D'Erasmo	A Seahorse Year	Winner	
2005	Valerie Miner	Abundant Light	Finalist	
2005	Emma Donoghue	Life Mask	Finalist	
2005	Maggie Dubris	Skels	Finalist	
2005	Susan Stinson	Venus of Chalk	Finalist	
2006	Abha Dawesar	Babyji	Winner	
2006	Jeanette Winterson	Lighthousekeeping	Finalist	
2006	Aren X. Tulchinsky	The Five Books of Moses Lapinsky	Finalist	
2006	Helen Humphreys	Wild Dogs	Finalist	
2006	Lauren Sanders	With or Without You	Finalist	
2007	Sarah Waters	The Night Watch	Winner	
2007	Sheila Ortiz Taylor	Outrageous	Finalist	
2007	J. D. Glass	Punk Like Me	Finalist	
2007	Michelle Tea	Rose of No Man's Land	Finalist	
2007	Leslie Larson	Slipstream	Finalist	
2008	Ali Liebegott	The IHOP Papers	Winner	
2008	Lucy Jane Bledsoe	Biting the Apple	Finalist	
2008	Mari SanGiovanni	Greetings from Jamaica	Finalist	
2008	Sarah Schulman	The Child	Finalist	
2008	Julia Watts	The Kind of Girl I Am	Finalist	
2008	Jess Wells	The Mandrake Broom	Finalist	
2009	Chandra Mayor	All the Pretty Girls	Winner (tie)	
2009	Emma Donoghue	The Sealed Letter	Winner (tie)	
2009	Ruth Perkinson	Breaking Spirit Bridge	Finalist	
2009	Stephanie Grant	Map of Ireland	Finalist	
2009	Ivan Coyote	The Slow Fix	Finalist	
2010	Jill Malone	A Field Guide to Deception	Winner	
2010	Jennifer McMahon	Dismantled	Finalist	
2010	Emma Pérez	Forgetting the Alamo, or, Blood Memory	Finalist	
2010	Elana Dykewomon	Risk	Finalist	
2010	Nairne Holtz	This One's Going to Last Forever	Finalist	
2011	Eileen Myles	Inferno (a poet's novel)	Winner	
2011	Lucy Jane Bledsoe	Big Bang Symphony	Finalist	
2011	Zelda Lockhart	Fifth Born II: The Hundredth Turtle	Finalist	
2011	Zoe Whittall	Holding Still for as Long as Possible	Finalist	
2011	Carol Guess	Homeschooling	Finalist	
2012	Farzana Doctor	Six Metres of Pavement	Winner	
2012	Kristyn Dunnion	The Dirt Chronicles	Finalist	
2012	Shannon Cain	The Necessity of Certain Behaviors	Finalist	
2012	Hillary Jordan	When She Woke	Finalist	
2012	Nina Revoyr	Wingshooters	Finalist	
2013	Thrity Umrigar	The World We Found	Winner	
2013	Carol Anshaw	Carry the One	Finalist	
2013	Ellis Avery	The Last Nude	Finalist	
2013	Jesse Blackadder	The Raven's Heart	Finalist	
2013	B. K. Loren	Theft	Finalist	
2013	Catherine Jones	Wonder Girls	Finalist	
2014	Chinelo Okparanta	Happiness, Like Water	Winner	
2014	T. Greenwood	Bodies of Water	Finalist	
2014	Ali Liebegott	Cha-Ching!	Finalist	
2014	Christiana Harrell	Cream	Finalist	
2014	e.E. Charlton-Trujillo	Fat Angie	Finalist	
2014	Kate Worsley	She Rises	Finalist	
2014	Jean Ryan	Survival Skills	Finalist	
2014	Chavisa Woods	The Albino Album	Finalist	
2014	Jeanette Winterson	The Daylight Gate	Finalist	
2014	Wally Lamb	We Are Water	Finalist	
2015	Alexis De Veaux	Yabo	Winner	
2015	Ann-Marie MacDonald	Adult Onset	Finalist	
2015	Qiu Miaojin	Last Words of Montmartre	Finalist	
2015	Francine Prose	Lovers at the Chameleon Club, Paris 1932	Finalist	
2015	M. B. Caschetta	Miracle Girls	Finalist	
2015	Shelly Oria	New York 1, Tel Aviv 0	Finalist	
2015	Brandy T. Wilson	The Palace Blues	Finalist	
2015	Sarah Waters	The Paying Guests	Finalist	
2016	Chinelo Okparanta	Under the Udala Trees	Winner	
2016	Virginie Despentes	Apocalypse Baby	Finalist	
2016	Mecca Jamilah Sullivan	Blue Talk and Love	Finalist	
2016	LaShonda Katrice Barnett	Jam on the Vine	Finalist	
2016	Debra Busman	Like a Woman	Finalist	
2016	Tiya Miles	The Cherokee Rose	Finalist	
2016	Miranda July	The First Bad Man	Finalist	
2016	Violette Leduc	Thérèse and Isabelle	Finalist	
2017	Nicole Dennis-Benn	Here Comes the Sun	Winner	
2017	Lucy Jane Bledsoe	A Thin Bright Line	Finalist	
2017	Jacqueline Woodson	Another Brooklyn	Finalist	
2017	Kathy Anderson	Bull & Other Stories	Finalist	
2017	M. B. Caschetta	Pretend I'm Your Friend	Finalist	
2017	Lynda A. Archer	Tears in the Grass	Finalist	
2017	Lynn C. Miller	The Day After Death	Finalist	
2017	Cathleen Schine	They May Not Mean To, But They Do	Finalist	
2018	Carmen Maria Machado	Her Body and Other Parties	Winner	
2018	Roxane Gay	Difficult Women	Finalist	
2018	S. J. Sindu	Marriage of a Thousand Lies	Finalist	
2018	Anne Garréta	Not One Day	Finalist	
2018	Leona Beasley	Something Better than Home	Finalist	
2018	Patricia A. Smith	The Year of Needy Girls	Finalist	
2018	Chavisa Woods	Things to Do When You're Goth in the Country	Finalist	
2018	Ariel Gore	We Were Witches	Finalist	
2019	Larissa Lai	The Tiger Flu	Winner	
2019	Trifonia Melibea Obono with Lawrence Schimel (trans.)	La Bastarda	Finalist	
2019	Sarah Schulman	Maggie Terry	Finalist	
2019	Genevieve Hudson	Pretend We Live Here	Finalist	
2019	Amber Dawn	Sodom Road Exit	Finalist	
2019	Lucy Jane Bledsoe	The Evolution of Love	Finalist	
2019	Nona Caspers	The Fifth Woman	Finalist	
2019	Krystal A. Smith	Two Moons	Finalist	
2020	Nicole Dennis-Benn	Patsy	Winner	
2020	Janice Gould	A Generous Spirit: Selected Work by Beth Brant	Finalist	
2020	Mathangi Subramanian	A People's History of Heaven	Finalist	
2020	Carolina De Robertis	Cantoras	Finalist	
2020	Kristen Arnett	Mostly Dead Things	Finalist	
2020	Shannon Pufahl	On Swift Horses	Finalist	
2020	Jacqueline Woodson	Red at the Bone	Finalist	
2020	Madeline Ffitch	Stay and Fight	Finalist	
2021	Julián Delgado Lopera	Fiebre Tropical	Winner	
2021	K-Ming Chang	Bestiary	Finalist	
2021	Francesca Ekwuyasi	Butter Honey Pig Bread	Finalist	
2021	Jennifer Steil	Exile Music	Finalist	
2021	Jean Kyoung Frazier	Pizza Girl	Finalist	
2022	Mia McKenzie	Skye Falling	Winner	
2022	Lauren Groff	Matrix	Finalist	
2022	Kirstin Valdez Quade	The Five Wounds	Finalist	
2022	Venita Blackburn	How to Wrestle a Girl	Finalist	
2022	Kristen Arnett	With Teeth	Finalist	
2023	K-Ming Chang	Gods of Want	Winner	
2023	Leila Mottley	Nightcrawling	Finalist	
2023	Mecca Jamilah Sullivan	Big Girl	Finalist	
2023	Julia Armfield	Our Wives Under the Sea	Finalist	
2023	Mónica Ojeda, trans. by Sarah Booker	Jawbone	Finalist	
2024	Catherine Lacey	Biography of X	Winner	
2024	Jen Beagin	Big Swiss	Finalist	
2024	K-Ming Chang	Organ Meats	Finalist	
2024	C. E. McGill	Our Hideous Progeny	Finalist	
2024	Helen Elaine Lee	Pomegranate	Finalist	
2025	Yael van der Wouden	The Safekeep	Winner	
2025	Venita Blackburn	Dead in Long Beach, California	Finalist	
2025	Emma Copley Eisenberg	Housemates	Finalist	
2025	Melissa Mogollon	Oye	Finalist	
2025	Maggie Thrash	Rainbow Black	Finalist	
2026	Kat Dunn	Hungerstone	Winner	
2026	Dylin Hardcastle	A Language of Limbs	Finalist	
2026	Marisa Crane	A Sharp Endless Need	Finalist	
2026	Shoshana von Blanckensee	Girls Girls Girls	Finalist	
2026	Jaime Burnet	milktooth	Finalist	
