= Terminal velocity (disambiguation) =

Terminal velocity is the speed at which an object falling through an atmosphere ceases to accelerate.

Terminal velocity may also refer to:

- Terminal Velocity (film), a 1994 film starring Charlie Sheen
- Terminal Velocity (video game), a flight action shooter game
- Terminal Velocity (Boyd novel), a novel by Blanche McCrary Boyd
- Terminal Velocity (Woodward novel), a novel written by M. P. Woodward
- Terminal Velocity (album), an album by John Petrucci
- Terminal Velocity, a level in the video game Sonic Colors

== See also ==
- Terminal (disambiguation)
