= Here Comes the Sun (Dennis-Benn novel) =

2016 novel by Nicole Dennis-Benn

- First edition cover
- Author: Nicole Dennis-Benn
- Audio read by: Bahni Turpin
- Cover artist: Jennifer Heuer
- Language: English
- Set in: Montego Bay, Jamaica
- Publisher: Liveright
- Publication date: July 5, 2016
- Publication place: United States
- Media type: Print
- Pages: 352
- ISBN: 978-1-63149-176-4
- OCLC: 921868995
- Dewey Decimal: 813/.6
- LC Class: PS3604.E58657 H47 2016

Here Comes the Sun is a 2016 novel by Nicole Dennis-Benn set in Montego Bay, Jamaica and published by Liveright Publishing Corporation. Dennis-Benn's debut novel, the book examines social issues in Jamaica, including skin bleaching, sex work, homophobia, rape, and the impact of tourism on local residents. The novel won the Lambda Literary Award for Lesbian Fiction.

Here Comes the Sun has garnered positive critical attention and praise as it explores many of Jamaica's controversial issues. Dennis-Benn hopes her novel will get “people talking and thinking,” as she explores the "themes of love, identity, sexuality, and belonging" that all readers may be able to connect to. Readers tell her "I went through that" as they read about the over-sexualization of girls and the hustle to thrive. One goal of the novel is to give a voice to the ignored issues and complacency in the working class. Reni Eddo-Loge describes the novel as "an engaging debut about exploitation and racial prejudice, as seen through the eyes of three women" showing the "creeping colonialism of the hotel industry" and the "effect of displacement" on local peoples.

The novel seeks to show the racial, social, and economic disparities that are often covered up by the Jamaican government's emphasis on unity. Poor and working-class Jamaicans are exploited “by the tourism industry to repay our [national] debt.” Naive Thandi, hotel worker Margot, her much older sister, and tourist-trapping Dolores, their mother, show, in three generations, the struggle that average Jamaicans face while trying daily to survive and find opportunities for success. According to Jennifer Senior, the novel shows “the ugliest legacy of colonialism,” the “self-hatred, passed down from one generation to the next” as Thandi tries to lighten her skin and her sister and mother remain caught up in the sex and tourism trades.

== Plot ==
The story, set in 1994, follows Delores and her two daughters Margot and Thandi, residents of the fictional town of River Bank, Jamaica. Delores spends her days selling trinkets to tourists to support her family. Thandi, a student, feels pressure to perform well in school but longs to become an artist, to lighten her skin, and to date Charles, a poor son of a fisher.

Margot works at a resort whose managers' development plans threaten to displace the residents of River Bank. She moonlights as a prostitute and later as a madam. She is secretly in a romantic relationship with a reclusive woman named Verdene, who is ostracized and harassed by the community because of her sexual orientation.

== Themes ==
=== Stigmatization and danger of sex work ===
Margot works as a prostitute at the hotel in order to save up additional money for Thandi to be able to go to private school and then college. Like many Jamaican sex workers, Margot does this because she has to, and she is often afraid that her coworkers at the hotel will find out and turn her in. Sharpe and Pinto explain that “Caribbean women see sex work as a legitimate way to raise money for...sending their children to private schools." There is also an underground sex tourism that brings both men and women travelers to Jamaica in order to explore their own sexuality and live out fantasies of having sex with someone 'exotic.' Nicole Dennis-Benn shows this in her novel through Margot, who explains the way men (male tourists) so often just want to see her black skin and see what her body looks like. Sharpe and Pinto confirm that studies show "Tourists often extend the romance of their vacation on an island paradise to the sex workers themselves."

=== Racial prejudice and skin whitening ===
Thandi struggles with her identity and popularity as a teenage girl because she is very dark skinned. She spends some of the little money her family has on cream from an old fisherman's wife, in an attempt to lighten her skin. Skin lightening is a booming industry in Jamaica, making huge profits. Thandi hopes to lighten her skin so that the boys at school will like her. They call her a "browning," and say that she will be more popular at the party she is invited to later in the school year if she has lighter skin. In an article exploring the skin bleaching culture in Jamaica, Rebekah Kebede interviews Jody Cooper who explains: "When you black in Jamaica, nobody see you." Christopher Charles notes that the bleaching culture comes from European ideals and Colonialism, since brown Jamaicans were assumed to be half-white and "often receiv[ing] greater access to land and resources as a result of their white ancestry." Dennis-Benn's story “Growing Up with Miss Jamaica” states "though they were strangers, our community seemed to love them more than they loved us" solely for their lighter skin. Being darker results in insults like "blackie" and though some people bleach for self-esteem or due to self-hatred, it has become an accepted part of Jamaican culture.

=== The destructive force of tourism ===
Tourism is a huge part of the Jamaican economy, though the money it brings in is tempered by the damage it causes to local communities and the environment. Margot earns decent money at the local resort and Delores earns her money by conning tourists into buying her souvenirs. Dennis-Benn shows how people use the tourists in order to survive, but she also shows the terrible living conditions that her characters deal with as they struggle to buy enough food and the small fishing town crumbles down outside of the sight of the resort. Margot reflects on her poor school friends who are mothers and struggling even more without the chance to work at the hotel, but the only reason Margot seems to make good money is because she also does sex work. Dennis-Benn explains that as tourism picked up, "the developers and government alike became ravenous, indifferent" to the struggles of their people in the quest for profits. Tourism creates tremendous pressure on people to sell and perform.

=== Homophobia ===
The novel addresses the issue of homophobia, which Dennis-Benn says is a significant problem in Jamaica. The character of Verdene is harassed by lesbophobic townspeople, while her lover Margot is uncomfortable with her own sexuality. Margot keeps the relationship a secret to protect herself, but also takes advantage of the community's homophobia to get a colleague fired.

== See also ==
- Prostitution in Jamaica
