= Nicole Dennis-Benn =

Jamaican novelist

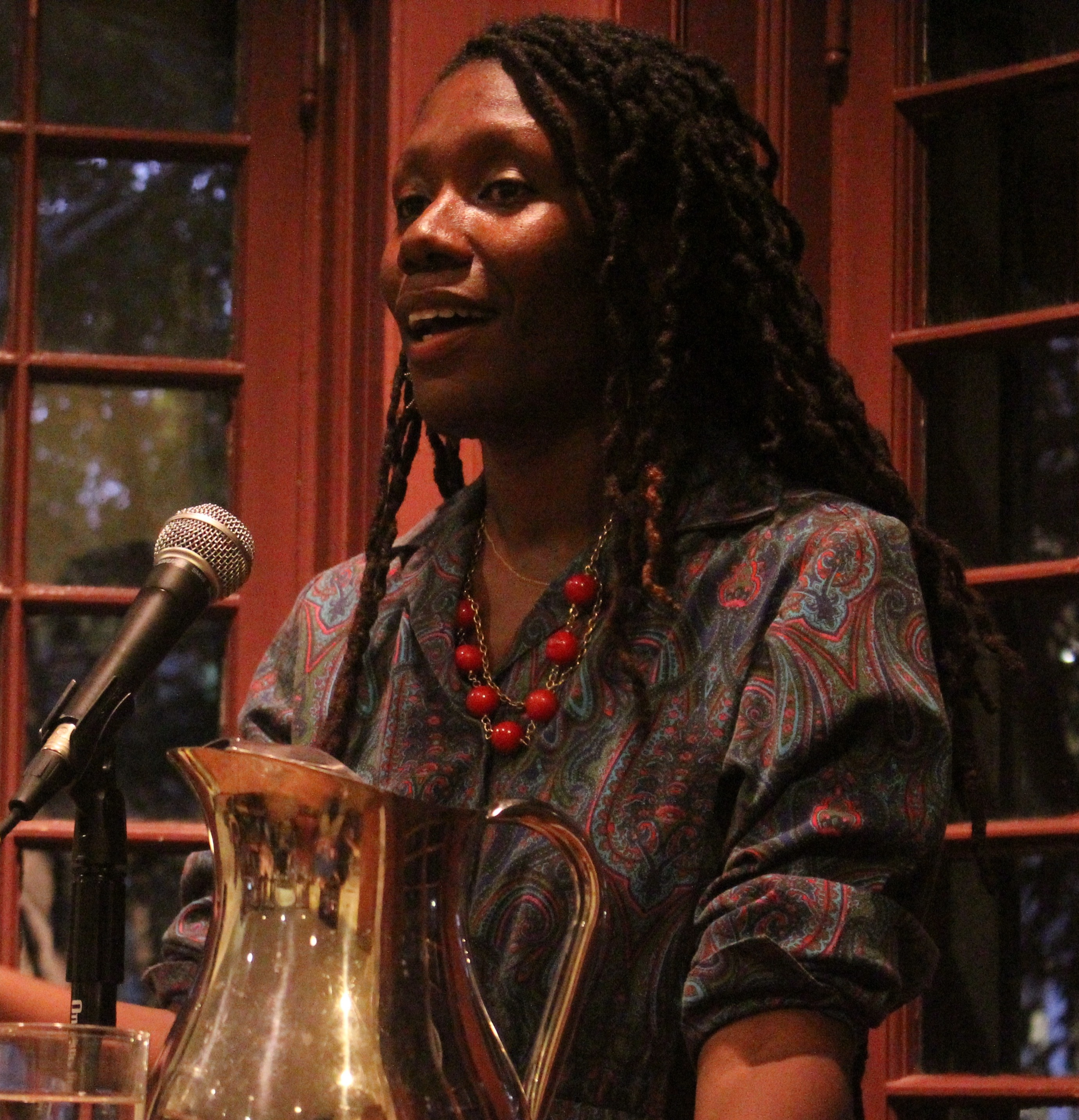
- Dennis-Benn in 2016
- Born: c. 1982; Kingston, Jamaica
- Citizenship: Jamaica (birth), United States^{[explain status]}
- Education: Sarah Lawrence College, University of Michigan, Cornell University, St. Andrew High School for Girls
- Occupation: Novelist
- Notable work: Here Comes the Sun; PATSY
- Spouse: Dr. Emma Benn (m. 2012)
- Website: www.nicoledennisbenn.com

Nicole Dennis-Benn (born c. 1982) is a Jamaican novelist. She is known for her 2016 debut novel, Here Comes the Sun, which was named "Best Book of the Year" by The New York Times, and for her best-selling novel, Patsy, acclaimed by Time, NPR, People Magazine, and Oprah Magazine. She lives and works in Brooklyn, New York. She is an out lesbian and feminist author who explores themes of gender, sexuality, Jamaican life, and its diaspora in her works. Her voice has been described as bold and provocative with an urgency to tell the stories she'd always wanted to read as a young girl growing up in Jamaica. Her books have remained as must-reads on various major lists since publication and have been translated into multiple languages, including German, Italian, French, and Portuguese. Her 3rd and 4th novels were acquired by Random House in auction.

== Life ==
Nicole Dennis-Benn was born and raised in Kingston, Jamaica. Her family lived in Vineyard Town, where she spent most of her childhood before moving to Portmore, St. Catherine. When she was 11 years old, Dennis-Benn won an academic scholarship to the prestigious St Andrew High School for Girls in Kingston. She left Jamaica at 17. In America, she went on to attend college, receiving a bachelor's degree in Biology and Nutritional Sciences from Cornell University. She wrote throughout her college years to cope with her homesickness and found that she enjoyed writing more than her pre-med courses. After graduation, she pursued a master's degree in Public Health, specializing in women's reproductive health, at the University of Michigan's top ranking MPH program in Ann Arbor. Dennis-Benn then went on to work as a Project Manager in Gender, Sexuality and Health Research in the Department of Sociomedical Sciences at Columbia University's Mailman School of Public Health for four years before finally deciding to pursue her passion as a writer.

While working at Columbia, she received her Masters of Fine Arts in Creative writing, Fiction, from Sarah Lawrence College.

=== Marriage ===
Nicole married her wife, Dr. Emma Benn, in May 2012 in Jamaica. Their wedding became a viral sensation on the island, making national news because “the media [had] played it out as the first lesbian wedding” on the island. Despite fears about their high visibility as "out" lesbians, their desire to have an outdoor ceremony, and the history of attacks on same-sex couples on the island, they were able to find a safe venue. Dennis-Benn describes parts of Jamaica as safer for same-sex couples and has committed and engaged LGBTQ friends on the island. She and her wife were married the same year that same-sex marriage became legal in New York in 2012 where they had their initial wedding ceremony. In Jamaica, friends and family joined to celebrate, with many curious and excited hotel staffers, all taking pictures of the ceremony.

== Awards and writing recognitions ==
In 2016, Dennis-Benn published her much acclaimed debut novel, Here Comes the Sun, with W.W. Norton/Liveright, becoming a writer to watch according to Publishers Weekly. She followed the success of her debut novel with the highly-acclaimed PATSY, which became a Read with Jenna Today Show Book-club pick. Nicole Dennis-Benn is a two time Lambda Literary Award winner for her novels, Here Comes the Sun and PATSY. Dennis-Benn is a recipient of the National Foundation for the Arts Grant. She was also a finalist for the National Book Critics Circle John Leonard Award, the New York Public Library Young Lions Award, the Center for Fiction's First Novel Prize; long-listed for the Pen/Faulkner Award in Fiction and short-listed for the Aspen Words Literary Prize. Her novels have appeared on several must-read and best-of-book lists.

She has written for Vogue, The New York Times, ELLE Magazine, Catapult, Red Rock Review, Kweli Literary Journal, Ebony, and the Feminist Wire.

== Writing ==
Nicole Dennis-Benn's work challenges issues of “homophobia,...sexualization of young girls, race, class, [and] socioeconomic disparities” In 2010, while bringing her partner to visit Jamaica, she was confronted again by all of these issues, and her own identity. This solidified her decision to become a writer rather than continue her medical career. Her writing is often described in literary reviews as "harsh," "striking," and "engaging." Her tone does what she intends in order to expose the controversial underside of Jamaica's flashy tourism. Dennis-Benn hopes that Jamaicans can see and hear themselves in her stories. Above all, she hopes to show that Jamaica is more than a tourist destination, depicting the reality and daily lives of the people. Dennis-Benn describes her work as "love letters" to her homeland. The dialogue in her stories and novels is written in the patois dialect. Jennifer Senior describes it as "one of the book's [Here Comes the Sun's] incidental pleasures, its own melodious tune." It gives insight into Jamaican culture and Dennis-Benn's "internal speech."

== Novels ==
=== Here Comes the Sun ===
Her debut novel, Here Comes the Sun, garnered positive critical attention and praise as it explores many of Jamaica's controversial issues. Dennis-Benn hopes her novel will get “people talking and thinking,” as she explores the "themes of love, identity, sexuality, and belonging" that all readers may be able to connect to.

The novel seeks to show the racial, social, and economic disparities that are often covered up by the Jamaican government's emphasis on unity. Poor and working-class Jamaicans are exploited “by the tourism industry to repay our [national] debt.” Naive Thandi, hotel worker Margot, her much older sister, and tourist-trapping Dolores, their mother, show, in three generations, the struggle that average Jamaicans face while trying daily to survive and find opportunities for success. According to Jennifer Senior, the novel shows “the ugliest legacy of colonialism,” the “self-hatred, passed down from one generation to the next” as Thandi tries to lighten her skin and her sister and mother remain caught up in the sex and tourism trades.

One goal of the novel is to give a voice to the ignored issues and complacency in the working class. Reni Eddo-Loge describes the novel as "an engaging debut about exploitation and racial prejudice, as seen through the eyes of three women" showing the "creeping colonialism of the hotel industry" and the "effect of displacement" on local peoples.

=== Patsy ===
Her second novel, Patsy, was released on 4 June 2019. An excerpt was published in feminist magazine Lenny Letter in 2017. The excerpt reveals a similar use of the patois dialect and themes of identity, motherhood, gender, class, and immigration.

== Themes ==
Dennis-Benn's works often cover themes of identity, race, class, sexuality, colonialism, mother-daughter relationships, and inter-generational traumas.

=== Sexuality ===
Her works address two sides of sexuality, the issue of being LGBT in Jamaica and the sexualization of young girls, especially by older men. Dennis-Benn was motivated to write because of these issues and her own experiences with them. Like the author, her heroine, Margot, in Here Comes the Sun lives a closeted life on Jamaica. According to Rosamond S. King, there is an increase in portrayals of same-sex couples in Jamaican literature. She explains that "the publication of Dennis-Benn’s...first [novel] with major US publishers—and major marketing budgets... marks a sea change in the literary landscape” and a possible resulting change in the self-identification of more Jamaican women as LGBT.

While there is more openness today, and there are more literary portrayals of same-sex Caribbean characters, there are still violent signs of homophobia in Jamaica. Dennis-Benn explains that her ability to write came only once she was in America, and that other LGBT Jamaicans have had similar experiences. King writes that “the homophobia that made [LGBT authors] immigrate are taken up by the media to become an integral part of the story of the entire region.” While laws in Jamaica still tend towards homophobia, Jamaicans themselves are less overwhelmingly homophobic according to King's study. Dennis-Benn's novel gives Jamaicans an entry point to discuss same-sex love through characters such as Margot, because while they may not understand Margot's sexuality, they can relate to other parts of her life, which humanizes the issue.

=== Working-class Jamaican life ===
Nicole Dennis-Benn describes being Jamaican as being "an ambassador" to the rest of the world. She says it feels like it is the job of working-class people to “sell the fantasy” of what the tourists expect Jamaica to be like to them. She wanted to show who the people behind the fantasy are because working class Jamaicans and women “are invisible." It is important that visitors can see the working class and see the real Jamaican culture. In an interview with LAFB, she describes how "upward mobility in Jamaica is extremely difficult, which is why a lot of working-class Jamaicans leave." A small number of Jamaicans, especially lighter skinned, own the resorts and profit from tourism, but many people are stuck in a rut of poverty. It is her hope that as Jamaicans read her novel and connect to themes that they will "realize that we are free — free to love, free to be, and most importantly, free to change."

=== Stigmatization and danger of sex work ===
In Here Comes the Sun, Margot works as a prostitute at the hotel in order to save up additional money for her younger sister, Thandi, to be able to go to private school and then college. Like many Jamaican sex workers, Margot does this because she has to, and she is often afraid that her coworkers at the hotel will find out and turn her in. Sharpe and Pinto explain that “Caribbean women see sex work as a legitimate way to raise money for...sending their children to private schools." There is also an underground sex tourism that brings both men and women travelers to Jamaica in order to explore their own sexuality and live out fantasies of having sex with someone 'exotic.' Nicole Dennis-Benn shows this in her novel through Margot, who explains the way men (male tourists) so often just want to see her black skin and see what her body looks like. Sharpe and Pinto confirm that studies show "Tourists often extend the romance of their vacation on an island paradise to the sex workers themselves."

=== Racial prejudice and skin whitening ===
Thandi, in Here Comes the Sun, struggles with her identity and popularity as a teenage girl because she is very dark skinned. She spends some of the little money her family has on cream from an old fisherman's wife, in an attempt to lighten her skin. Skin lightening is a booming industry in Jamaica, making huge profits. Thandi hopes to lighten her skin so that the boys at school will like her. They call her a "browning," and say that she will be more popular at the party she is invited to later in the school year if she has lighter skin. In an article exploring the skin bleaching culture in Jamaica, Rebekah Kebede interviews Jody Cooper who explains: "When you black in Jamaica, nobody see you." Christopher Charles notes that the bleaching culture comes from European ideals and Colonialism, since brown Jamaicans were assumed to be half-white and "often receiv[ing] greater access to land and resources as a result of their white ancestry." Dennis-Benn's story “Growing Up with Miss Jamaica” states "though they were strangers, our community seemed to love them more than they loved us" solely for their lighter skin. Being darker results in insults like "blackie" and though some people bleach for self-esteem or due to self-hatred, it has become an accepted part of Jamaican culture.

=== The destructive force of tourism ===
Tourism is a huge part of the Jamaican economy, though the money it brings in is tempered by the damage it causes to local communities and the environment. In Here Comes the Sun, Margot earns decent money at the local resort and Delores earns her money by conning tourists into buying her souvenirs. Dennis-Benn shows how people use the tourists in order to survive, but she also shows the terrible living conditions that her characters deal with as they struggle to buy enough food and the small fishing town crumbles down outside of the sight of the resort. Margot reflects on her poor school friends who are mothers and struggling even more without the chance to work at the hotel, but the only reason Margot seems to make good money is because she also does sex work. Dennis-Benn explains that as tourism picked up, "the developers and government alike became ravenous, indifferent" to the struggles of their people in the quest for profits. Tourism creates tremendous pressure on people to sell and perform.

== Bibliography ==
=== Novels ===
- Here Comes the Sun (2016)
- Patsy (2019)

=== Short writings, articles, and stories ===
- "Who's Allowed to Hold Hands?"
- "The Day I Learnt to Accept that My Dark Skin was Beautiful"
- "We Deh Yah"
- “What it Means to be a Writing in the Time of Trump"
- “My First Visit to the Church of American Democracy"
- “Resistance, Desire, and History: The Story of My Deadlocks"
- “A Woman-Child in Jamaica"
- "Coming Out as a Writer"
- "Innocence is a Privilege: Black Children Are Not Allowed to Be Innocent in America"
- "Breaking Taboos and Loving the Characters We Fear"
- "Growing Up With Miss Jamaica"
- "Shifting Selves: Holding Two Flags"
- "Mecca Jamilah Sullivan: Interview"
- "What’s in a Name"
- "What’s for Sale" (Nominated for 2016 Pushcart Prize)
- "God Nuh Like Ugly" (Nominate for 2016 Pushcart Prize)
- "Chinelo Okparanta-Interview"
- "Ayana Mathis: Interview"
- "The Measure of a True Artiste"
- "In Her Own Words"
- "The Impact of Living Out Loud as a Gay Jamaican"

== See also ==
- Caribbean Literature
- Lambda Literary Award
- LGBT culture in New York City
- List of LGBT people from New York City
- NYC Pride March
