= Jane DeLynn =

American author and journalist

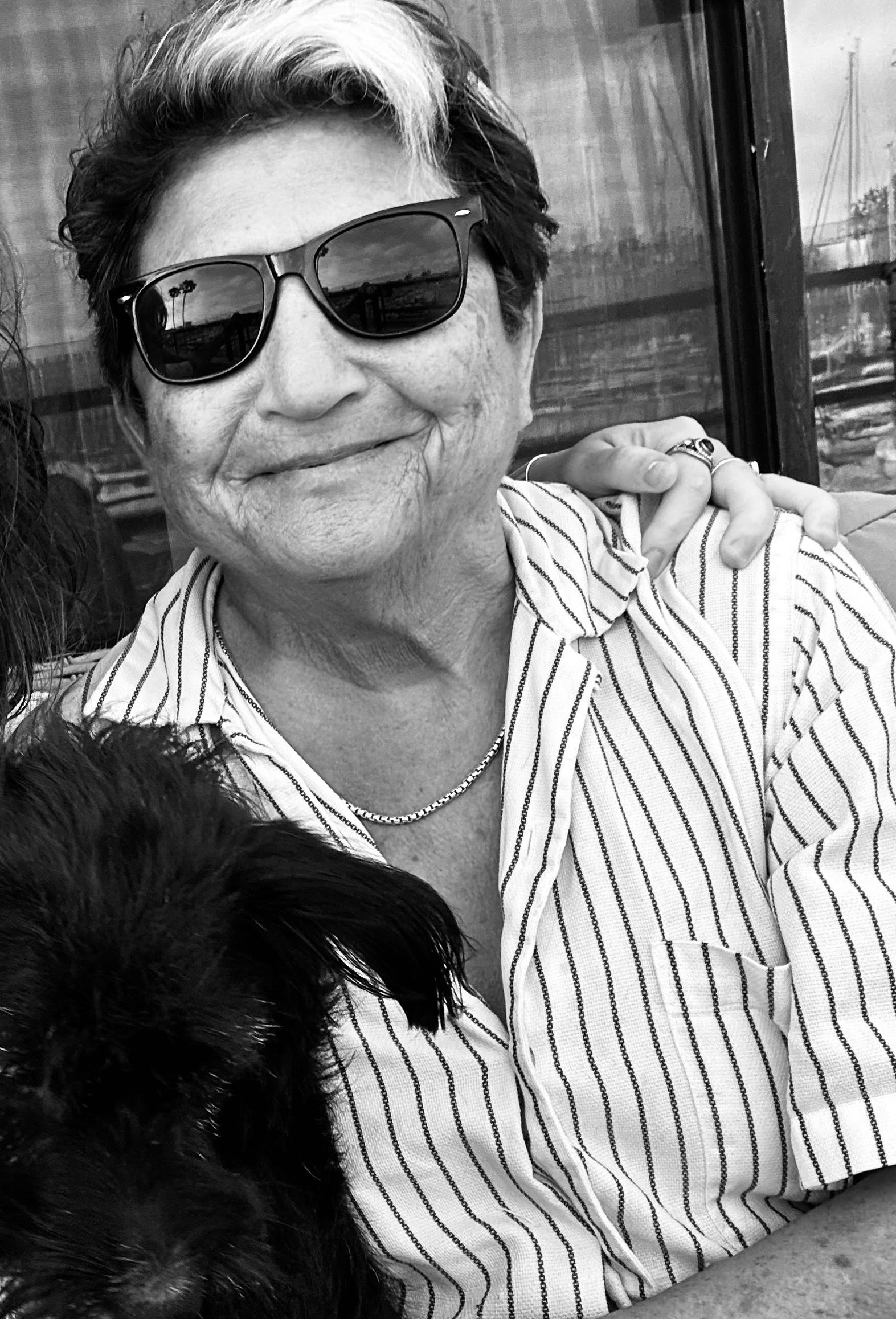
Jane DeLynn

Jane DeLynn is an American author and journalist, known for her critically acclaimed novels such as In Thrall, Leash, Don Juan in the Village, and Some Do. Her novel Real Estate was named a New York Times Notable Book. DeLynn's work has been featured in publications like The Paris Review, Mademoiselle, Glamour, Harper's Bazaar, and The New York Times. Additionally, she served as a correspondent in Saudi Arabia during the Gulf War for Mirabella and Rolling Stone. She is also the author of two plays and wrote the libretto for The Monkey Opera, a children's opera that premiered at the Brooklyn Academy of Music.

== Publications ==
DeLynn's novels are known for their exploration of human relationships, identity, and societal complexities. Her novel Don Juan was a nominee for the Lambda Literary Award for Lesbian Fiction (1990).

=== Novels ===
- Some Do (Macmillan Publishers, 1978) ISBN 978-0-02-019520-7
- In Thrall (Clarkson N. Potter,1982) ISBN 978-0-299-19014-9
- Real Estate (Poseidon Press, 1988) ISBN 978-0-671-54424-9
- Don Juan in the Village (Serpent's Tail, 1991) ISBN 978-1-85242-227-1
- Leash (Semiotext(e), 2002) ISBN 978-1-58435-014-9

=== Libretto ===
- The Monkey Opera, composed by Roger Tréfousse, premiered at the Brooklyn Academy of Music
