= Cynthia Chin-Lee =

American writer

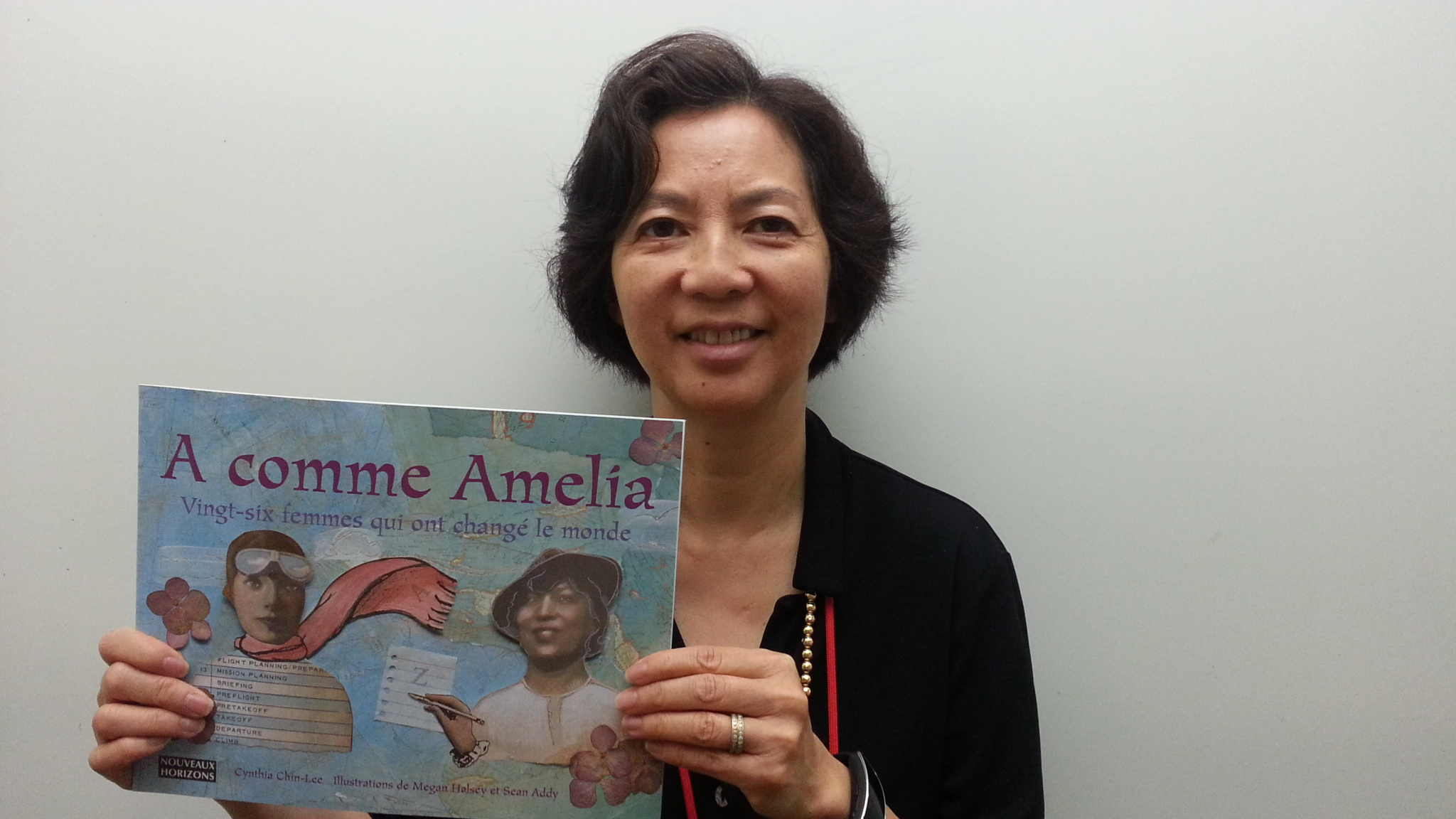
- Born: October 14, 1958 (age 67); Washington DC, US
- Education: Harvard (1980)
- Occupation: Writer
- Writing career
- Genre: Children's stories
- Website: cynthiachinlee.com

Cynthia Chin-Lee (born 1958) is an American children's book author.

== Early life ==
Chin-Lee was born and raised in Washington, D.C. Her father, William Chin-Lee, was a doctor and her mother, Nancy Chin-Lee, was an artist. She was the youngest of five siblings. In the 6th grade she started writing. "I liked writing poetry and scribbling in my journal because I found it comforting and therapeutic. I still write for that reason and because I like playing with words."

== Career ==
Chin-Lee is mostly known for being a children's book author and speaker. A magna cum laude graduate of Harvard University and member of the Society of Children's Book Writers and Illustrators, Chin-Lee has given numerous keynote speeches and has led workshops for schools, universities and professional associations. Chin-Lee has worked with a number of illustrators including You Shan Tang, Yumi Heo, Enrique O. Sanchez, Megan Halsey, Sean Addy and Lea Lyon. Chin-Lee started her writing career in the field of banking and tech. She currently works as a publications manager at Oracle.

=== Books ===
Chin-Lee has written several award-winning books; of the eight, seven are books for children. An advocate for civil rights and anti-discrimination, Chin-Lee enjoys sharing stories of truth and wisdom to help children face the challenges of racism, sexism, and homophobia.

- It's Who You Know: The Magic of Networking in Person and on the Internet

This publication outlines strategies for expanding professional networks through online and offline methods.

- Almond Cookies and Dragon Well Tea

This a story of a cross cultural friendship where Erica (European American) visits the home of her Chinese American friend, discovering that their homes aren't too different after all.

- A is for Asia

An alphabet book that introduces the diversity of foods, holidays, traditions and cultures within Asia. Native languages are also included for the descriptions for each letter.

- A is for the Americas - co-authored with Terri de la Peña

Including 48 different countries and 11 language groups, this book gives insight of different cultural aspects of North, Central and South America.

- Amelia to Zora: Twenty-six Women Who Changed the World

This book contains a brief biography for each of the twenty-six women who have changed the world in multiple fields such as sports, politics, the sciences and the arts. Each biography explains the hardships and triumphs of each woman. Amelia to Zora has been translated into French (title: A comme Amelia) by Nouveaux Horizons, ARS, Paris 2014.

- Akira to Zoltán: Twenty-six Men Who Changed the World

This sibling book to Amelia to Zora, Akira to Zoltan shows men who have pursued their dreams, challenged themselves and changed the world. From Akira Kurosawa, Japanese filmmaker to political leaders such as Nelson Mandela, this book profiles some of the world's most influential men and their contributions.

- Operation Marriage

The story is about eight-year old Alex and her best friend Zach, who ended his friendship with her because Alex's parents were not legally married. At that time gay marriage was allowed in California, but the controversial Proposition 8 later banned gay marriage. However, before it passed, Alex with her younger brother Nicky persuaded their mothers, Mama Kathy and Mama Lee to get legally married. Sarah Hoffman, author of the Pink Boys, writes "Operation Marriage is an honest, insightful, and touching story illustrating the many ways that lack of marriage equality impacts kids' lives."

The book won a Moonbeam award under the category of Compassion in 2012. The story has been made into a short film directed by Quentin Lee.

- Women and the Right to Vote

This book covers American women's fight for the right to vote, a battle waged over many decades by women from all walks of life. The year 2020 brings the centennial celebration of the Nineteenth Amendment to the U.S. Constitution, which granted women the right to vote.

=== Awards ===
- Amelia Bloomer List
- Texas Association for the Gifted and Talented Legacy Award, all for Amelia to Zora.
- National Council on Social Studies/Children's Book Council Notable Children's Book in Social Studies.
- "Best 100 American Children's Books of the Century" by "Ruminator Review.
- Moonbeam Children's Book Awards for Compassion.

=== Bibliography ===
- It's Who You Know: The Magic of Networking, in Person and on the Internet (1998).
- Almond Cookies and Dragon Well Tea (1993).
- A Is for Asia (1997).
- A Is for the Americas (1999).
- Amelia to Zora: Twenty-six Women Who Changed the World (2005).
- Akira to Zoltán: Twenty-six Men Who Changed the World (2006).
- Operation Marriage (2011).
- Women and the Right to Vote (2020).
