= Venita Blackburn =

American author (born 1983)

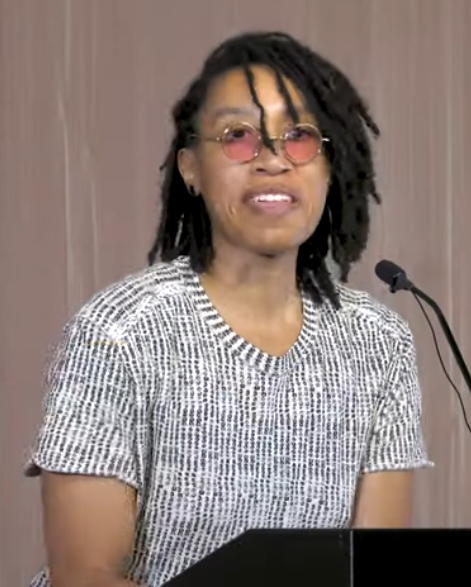
- At an ASU alumni reading in 2022
- Born: 1983 (age 42–43); Los Angeles, California, United States
- Education: University of Southern California; Arizona State University
- Occupation: Author
- Known for: Flash fiction
- Notable work: Black Jesus and Other Superheroes; How to Wrestle a Girl; Dead in Long Beach, California
- Website: venitablackburn.com

Venita Blackburn (born 1983) is an American author. Her short story collection How to Wrestle a Girl was nominated for the Lambda Literary Award for Lesbian Fiction in 2022 and her debut novel Dead in Long Beach, California was a finalist for the 2025 PEN/Jean Stein Book Award and the 2025 Lambda Literary Award for Lesbian Fiction. She is known for writing flash fiction and her stories have been published in The New Yorker, The Atlantic, Harper's and The Paris Review.

== Early life and education ==
Blackburn was born in Harbor City, Los Angeles and grew up in Compton, California, the youngest of three children. When Blackburn was 24, her mother died, and four years later her father also died. Blackburn was raised Southern Baptist and taught at a Sunday school in her early twenties.

After graduating from Compton High School at 16, Blackburn attended University of Southern California, then Arizona State University as a postgrad, where she obtained an MFA in Fiction.

In 2016, Blackburn founded Live, Write, a non-profit that organizes free writing workshops for writers of color.

== Career ==
Blackburn's debut short story collection, Black Jesus and Other Superheroes, was published in 2017, after winning the 2016 Raz-Shumaker Prairie Schooner Book Prize for Fiction. It also won the 2018 PEN America Los Angeles Literary Award for Fiction, and was nominated for the PEN/Robert W. Bingham Prize and the Young Lions Fiction Award. The titular story, "Black Jesus", was later selected for the collection Be Gay Do Crime: Sixteen Stories of Queer Chaos, edited by Molly Llewellyn and Kristel Buckley.

In 2021, Blackburn's next short story collection, How to Wrestle a Girl was published by Farrar, Straus & Giroux. In this collection, Blackburn experimented with short stories told in unconventional forms, such as quizzes and crossword puzzles. The Paris Review named the collection as one of their staff picks. Writing for The New York Times, Jared Jackson praised Blackburn's linguistic economy, but criticized the fragmented nature of some stories, and Publishers Weekly found some experimentally formatted stories felt more like exercises than stories. The book was nominated for the Lambda Literary Award for Lesbian Fiction in 2022.

Dead in Long Beach, California, Blackburn's debut novel, published in 2024, the second book in her two-book deal with Farrar, Straus & Giroux. The novel is written in first-person plural, following Coral, a young woman who impersonates her brother after he commits suicide. Stef Robino of Autostraddle praised the novel as a "masterful feat of storytelling". In her review for The New York Times, Megan Milks praised the "disarming humor and vivacity" of Blackburn's prose. However, Stephen Kearse, writing for The Washington Post, described the novel as "more void than vision". Publishers Weekly was critical of the novel's "dense and obscure" excerpts from the in-universe graphic novel, but praised Blackburn's skills as an "excellent prose stylist".

Blackburn is working on a novel based on a short story she wrote for Gagosian Quarterly, about a ghoul and a poltergeist falling in love, who possess the bodies of two Black lesbians during the Reconstruction era.

== Personal life ==
Blackburn currently resides in Fresno, California, where she works as an Associate Professor of English at California State University.

She is gay and married her partner in 2024.

== Works ==
=== Novels ===
- Dead in Long Beach, California (2024)

=== Collected short fiction ===
- Black Jesus and Other Superheroes (2017)
- How to Wrestle a Girl (2021)

=== Short fiction ===
- "Scars" (American Short Fiction, February 2012)
- "Fam" (The Paris Review, Issue 226, Fall 2018)
- "Ground Fighting" (Story, Issue 8, Summer 2020)
- "Live Birth" (Iowa Review, Volume 50, Issue 3, Winter 2020/21)
- "Black Communion" (Harper's, Spring 2021)
- "Halloween" (The New Yorker, August 2021)
- "In the Clinic for Telling Lies in Order to Survive Pending Death" (The Atlantic, 2022)

=== Essays ===
- "I've Never Watched Anything as Transformative as 'Sailor Moon'" (The New York Times, 2023)

== Awards and nominations ==
- 2016 Raz-Shumaker Prairie Schooner Book Prize for Fiction for Black Jesus and Other Superheroes
- 2018 PEN America Los Angeles Literary Award for Fiction for Black Jesus and Other Superheroes
- 2018 PEN/Robert W. Bingham Prize for Black Jesus and Other Superheroes (finalist)
- 2018 Young Lions Fiction Award for Black Jesus and Other Superheroes (finalist)
- 2022 Lambda Literary Award for Lesbian Fiction for How to Wrestle a Girl (finalist)
- 2025 PEN/Jean Stein Book Award for Dead in Long Beach, California (finalist)
- 2025 Lambda Literary Award for Lesbian Fiction for Dead in Long Beach California (finalist)
