= Madelyn Arnold =

American writer

Madelyn Arnold (born 1950) is an American fiction writer. In 1989, she won the inaugural Lambda Literary Award for Lesbian Debut Fiction for her novel Bird-Eyes.

== Early life and education ==
Madelyn Arnold was born in Indianapolis, Indiana, in 1950. Her childhood was marked by poverty and abuse, and she became responsible for taking care of the household at only 8 years old. She became involved in political activism as a teenager, joining the NAACP in high school and writing to Socialist political candidates for information.

Arnold attended college at Ball State University starting around age 16, studying biology and medical illustration. It was there that she discovered her lesbian identity, and after being outed she was forced to leave the school. She did eventually obtain a bachelor's in microbiology from Indiana University Bloomington in 1973, but she also became homeless and was institutionalized for a period before finding a new home in Seattle, Washington, in 1975.

In Seattle, she worked in labs, hospitals, and clinics throughout the 1970s and '80s. She went on to obtain a master's in creative writing from the University of Washington.

== Writing career ==
Arnold's debut novel, Bird-Eyes, was published in 1988 to critical acclaim. Distributed by Seal Press, it won the inaugural Lambda Literary Award for Lesbian Debut Fiction in 1989. It fictionalized her real experiences with institutionalization as a teenager, in a period when queer women were frequently committed to mental institutions. It was later re-released by St. Martin's Press.

In 1992, she released the short story collection On Ships at Sea, which included pieces she had been working on since 1976. The collection, published by St. Martin's Press, features predominantly lesbian characters in a wide variety of circumstances. It was a finalist for the Lambda Literary Award for Lesbian Fiction the following year.

Then, in 2000, she published the novel A Year of Full Moons, which tells the story of a tomboy girl named Josephine Margaret Butler growing up in Kentucky during the turbulent political year of 1963.

Arnold has been a longtime contributor to the Seattle Gay News, for which she wrote the column "Not Thinking Straight." She also wrote for the Zodiac News Service and has taught fiction at the University of Washington and Seattle Central Community College.
