= Abha Dawesar =

American novelist

- Born: Abha Dawesar; 1 January 1974 (age 52); New Delhi, India
- Occupation: Novelist
- Writing career
- Period: 2000–present
- Notable works: Babyji, Family Values, That Summer in Paris, Miniplanner
- Website: www.abhadawesar.com

Abha Dawesar (born 1 January 1974) is an Indian-born novelist writing in English. Her novels include Babyji, Family Values, That Summer in Paris, and Miniplanner. Her 2005 novel Babyji won the Lambda Literary Award for Lesbian Fiction and the Stonewall Book Award.

== Biography ==
Abha Dawesar was born in New Delhi. She moved to the United States to attend Harvard University, where she graduated in 1995.

Before publishing her award-winning second novel, Babyji (2005), Dawesar was working at a global financial services firm in Manhattan. She quit her job to devote her time to writing.

Dawesar has been exhibiting photography, visual, and video art since she was a student at Harvard. Her work has been exhibited at various galleries and museums in the United States and abroad.

In 2010, she wrote part of the screenplay for the film Love and the Cities, directed by Rodrigo Bernardo.

Since 2013, Dawesar has been speaking on issues around digital technology and its effects on social behavior and experience.

== Awards ==
- Fiction Fellow, New York Foundation for the Arts (2000)
- Lambda Literary Award for Lesbian Fiction, for Babyji (2005)
- Stonewall Book Award, American Library Association, for Babyji (2006)

== Bibliography ==
=== Novels ===
- Miniplanner (2000) (published in India by Penguin Books under the title The Three of Us)
- Babyji (2005) (winner of the Stonewall Book Award and Lambda Literary Award, 2006)
- That Summer in Paris (2006)
- Family Values (2011)
- Sensorium (2012)
- Madison Square Park (2016)

=== Short stories ===
- The Good King in Menon, Anil; Singh, Vandana (2014). Breaking the Bow: Speculative Fiction Inspired by the Ramayana. Zubaan Books. p. 47. ISBN 9789383074174.

== Personal life ==
She lives in New York City.
