= Under the Udala Trees =

2015 novel by Chinelo Okparanta

Under The Udala Trees
- First edition (UK)
- Author: Chinelo Okparanta
- Language: English
- Genre: Literary fiction
- Publisher: Granta Books (UK); Houghton Mifflin Harcourt (US)
- Publication date: 2015
- Publication place: United States
- Media type: Novel
- Pages: 349 pp

Under the Udala Trees is a novel by Nigerian-American author Chinelo Okparanta written in 2015. It is set in 1960s Nigeria and follows the story of Ijeoma, a girl growing up in war-torn Nigeria who must come to term with her sexuality and the conflict this presents in society.

The novel is told in a first person narrative from the protagonist's viewpoint, namely Ijeoma, and as such, the story is told with her voice and perspective.

Okparanta's mother had watched her father die in the same way during the Nigerian Civil War that the novel's protagonist sees her father die, linking with how Okparanta's own real life experience has informed her in the context of writing the novel.

The novel is Okparanta's first, following her short stories collection Happiness, Like Water (2013), and has received generally positive reception since its publication in 2015. In 2016, as part of the Annual Lambda Literary Awards, the novel won an award for "Best Lesbian Fiction".

== Plot ==
The novel opens in 1960's Nigeria, following the tale of Ijeoma, a young girl who lives in a small town called Ojoto with her mother, Adaora, and father, Uzo, in the middle of the Nigerian Civil War.

Following an air raid at the start of the novel, Ijeoma and her mother Adaora escape unharmed but her father is killed. This leaves Ijeoma under Adaora's care. The death of Uzo has a profound effect on Adaora's mental health, sending her into a trance-like state. Ijeoma is reluctant to be separated due to the strong bond she has with her mother and her young age, but Adaora believes Nnewi will be safer for her.

Ijeoma is taken in by a schoolteacher and his wife in Nnewi. She meets a young Hausa orphan named Amina, who also moves in with the schoolteacher. The two girls fall in love, but when their relationship is discovered by the schoolteacher, he tells Adaora. A horrified Adaora takes Ijeoma to live with her in their home, while Amina remains with the schoolteacher. Ijeoma and Amina attend the same school and initially remain close, but their relationship slowly fizzles out. Amina later marries a Hausa boy.

Back home in Ojoto, Adaora makes it her goal to turn Ijeoma straight and preach (from the Bible) that homosexuality is wrong and that she must change (become heterosexual) to make it right. Adaora preaches that no lesbian relationship is right and that Ijeoma will feel the full force of God's wrath if she doesn't change her ways and end this lifestyle. Ijeoma is initially resistant to the strong influence exerted by her mother, but eventually succumbs to the power of the Bible and tries to change and live a heterosexual life.

While working at her mother's store, Ijeoma meets a female customer, Ndidi, who she begins a relationship with. An unaware Adaora tries to convince Ijeoma to date her childhood friend, Chibundu, who is interested in her. Although Ijeoma is initially disinterested, Ndidi suggests she marry him so she can live a normal life. In order to make her mother happy and fit in with heteronormative standards, Ijeoma marries Chibundu and they have a daughter together. Ijeoma sends Ndidi letters, but Ndidi never replies.

While Chibundu does not consider homosexuality a sin, he is unhappy that Ijeoma has not borne him a son. Their relationship deteriorates further after Chibundu finds a love letter Ijeoma had not sent to Ndidi, and Ijeoma realizes that Chibundu was hiding Ndidi's replies to her previous letters. Ijeoma leaves Chibundu and goes to her mother's house, taking her daughter with her.

The novel ends on a hopeful and more positive note. A few decades later, Ijeoma and Ndidi are still together, while Adaora has come to accept her daughter's homosexuality.

== Characters ==
Ijeoma: The young female protagonist of the novel and the voice of the first person narrative. She is sent away from her mother early in the novel to live in Nnewi with a grammar teacher which is reportedly safer for her. Ijeoma is lesbian and must come to terms with her sexuality in a homophobic society. While growing up as a young girl, she falls in love and enters two separate relationships with two other female characters in the novel, Amina and Ndidi, neither of which last as Ijeoma eventually succumbs to fierce backlash from her mother. She reluctantly marries a man later in the novel, Chibundu, and has a child with him to comply with heteronormativity. Ijeoma eventually divorces Chibundu after growing tired of living in a marriage with a man she genuinely doesn't love while Chibundu disapproves of Ijeoma's previous affection towards Ndidi when it comes to light, and Ijeoma subsequently then moves back in with Adaora.

Adaora: Ijeoma's mother. Shortly after her husband, Uzo, dies, she falls into a trance of following the Bible and its messages, which influences how she raises Ijeoma. Adaora preaching disapproval of Ijeoma's homosexuality and associated relationships with other females is her wanting to do what's 'right' for her daughter in terms of society, rather than attempting to be outright homophobic. Adaora becomes Chidinma's grandmother when she is born, and by the end of the novel, eventually accepts that Ijeoma's homosexuality is not able to be changed.

Uzo: Ijeoma's father. Killed in an airstrike at the start of the novel, an event which has mental health consequences for Adaora and pushes her to resort to the Bible for solace, a move which affects how she treats Ijeoma for the rest of the novel. Uzo's critical thinking skills displayed at the start of the novel, which Ijeoma herself inherits, and are vital for her to be able to critically reinterpret the bible herself and use this to eventually shut down the bible's oppressive power.

Amina: A young girl who is Ijeoma's first love interest in the novel. Like Ijeoma, Amina has also been impacted by the war and has been separated from her family and soon lives with Ijeoma and the School teacher. Amina and Ijeoma's romantic and sexual relationship eventually falls apart from other authoritarian characters' (such as Adaora and the School Teacher's) disapproval and shaming upon finding out about the relationship.

The School Teacher: An elementary School teacher who takes in Ijeoma after Adaora sends her away to Nnewi. He eventually also takes in Amina after persuasion from Ijeoma.

Ndidi: Another teacher that Ijeoma falls in love with and starts a romantic and sexual relationship with, but as with Amina, it eventually crumbles when Adaora finds out and relentlessly oppresses her daughter into ending the relationship.

Chibundu: A young man that Ijeoma marries in order to comply with heteronormativity. Although Ijeoma lacks physical attraction to him, the two get along well enough to eventually have a child together, Chidinma. Ijeoma's relationship with Chibundu turns sour when he discovers, through unsent letters, her previous affection for Ndidi and becomes hostile. Ijeoma then eventually grows tired of a marriage with a man she doesn't love and divorces him.

Chidinma: Ijeoma's daughter, who is born late in the novel during her marriage with Chibundu. When Ijeoma ends her marriage and relationship with Chibundu, she takes Chidinma with her when she goes back to live with Adaora.

== Themes ==
The novel draws on several themes relating to war, family, mother-daughter relationships, homosexuality, religion and Bildungsroman.

Okparanta, in the context of writing this novel, has described herself as "a champion for love", linking with the novels focus on homosexuality and drawing attention to the associated same-sex relationships within.

Okparanta has also made important reference to the theme of women, describing the novel as very "women oriented". She further reiterates the significance of Ijeoma and Adaora's mother-daughter relationship in the novel stating that "That family, that mother and daughter, will always be mother and daughter and will have to find a way even if forever they are fighting. They will find a way to coexist.”, the latter sentence in the quote making reference to Adaora eventually accepting Ijeoma's sexuality and that it cannot be altered.

Religion has also been seen to be an important theme in the novel in regards to the bible specifically being a catalyst behind the Nigerian gay community's plight, with another critic noting "A narrow reading of the Bible, she [Okparanta] suggests, is partly to blame for Nigeria's vicious treatment of the gay community."

Other critics have noted the importance of Bildungsroman, namely, the focus of the psychological and moral growth of the main character, Ijeoma's, psychological and moral growth in accepting herself and her homosexual identity in a hostile society. Courtois remarks in regards to Bildungsroman how being a woman would also contribute to her journey of self discovery and growing up, noting that "Ijeoma becomes aware of the limitations to her self-construction that society imposes on her because she is a woman.".

== Critical reception ==
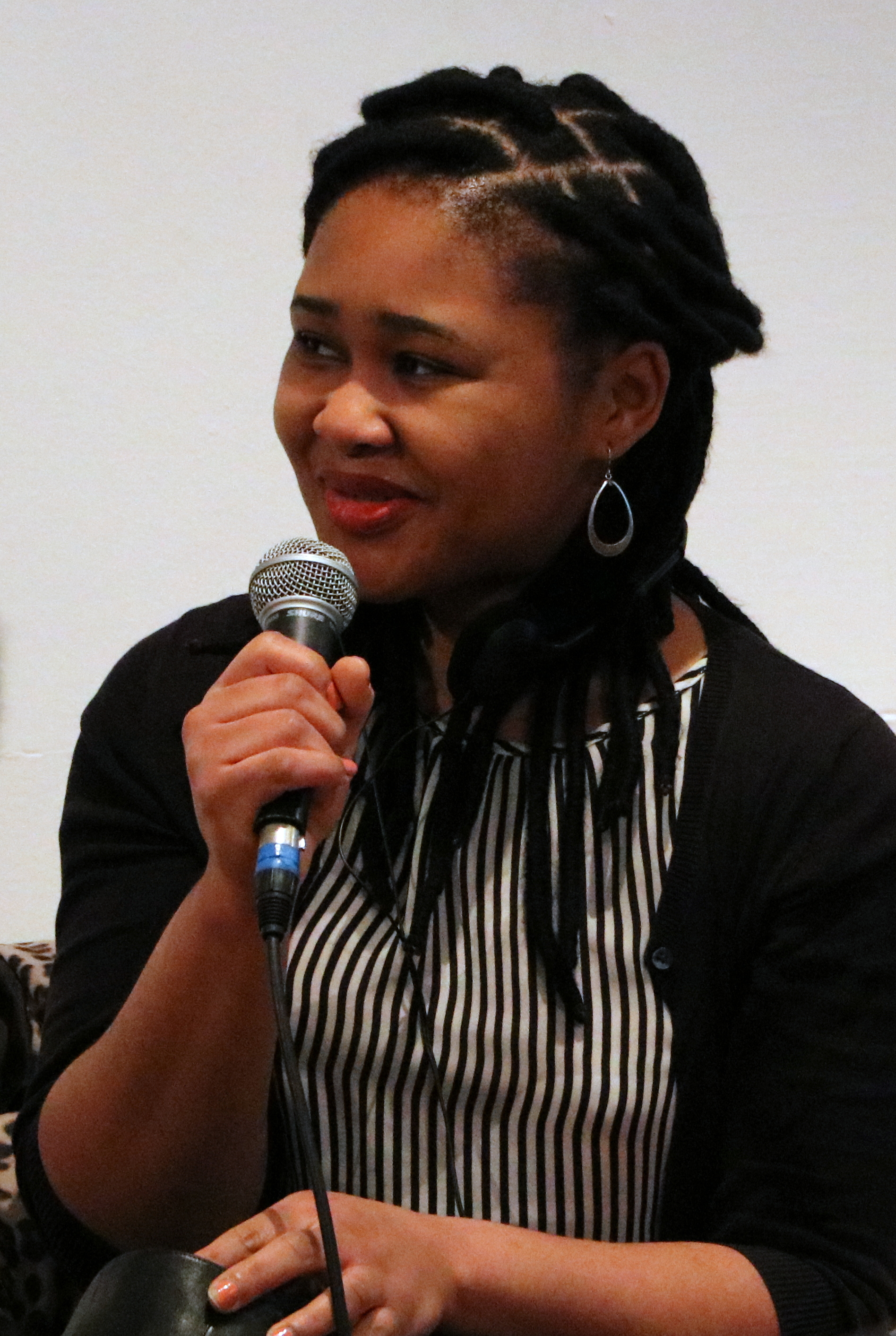
Chinelo Okparanta in 2018

Critical Reception for Under the Udala Trees has been generally positive, praising the structure of the prose, writing style and discussion of themes while more negative criticism has been directed from some readers at not being able to sympathise with the plight of the LGBT characters in the Nigerian context.

Geoff Wisner (2015) has described the novel as exceeding his expectations, in that it "quietly undermines the readers expectations". Geoff Wisner (2015), in the context of the political themes within the literature, also praised the novel for reading naturally like a story, "unlike others, Under the Udala Trees never reads like a position paper or protest speech" (2015). Taiwo Adeyemi Osinubi (2018) meanwhile, makes note of both the significance of Opkaranta's first published novel as well as the themes that are addressed within, in that it "makes critical interventions in literary history".

Shannon Geary has meanwhile praised the novels use of intersectionality, remarking that "her intentions of not narrowing the focus to just a lesbian story shine through". Shannon Geary furthermore praised the novels 'scene-painting' and ability to communicate cultural context to a Western audience, remarking that "American readers would not have a backlog of information about the landscape of Nigeria - geographical or political - but Okparanta makes it accessible to non-Nigerian readers."

However, negative reception, in the context of a Western audience, found it hard to understand the plight of the LGBT characters in Nigeria. Okparanta noted negative reception towards her novel primarily revolved around some Western readers being oblivious to the anti-LGBT climate in Nigeria, with criticism such as "we've moved on from that - LGBTQ people don't struggle here (America) with that anymore" as well as "Africa and Nigeria are so behind. Here, people can marry now,”.
