= Harry Sylvester Bird =

2022 novel by Chinelo Oparanta

- Author: Chinelo Okparanta
- Language: English
- Genre: Fiction
- Publisher: Mariner Books
- Publication date: July 12, 2022
- Publication place: Nigeria
- ISBN: 0-358-61727-8

Harry Sylvester Bird is a 2022 Novel by Chinelo Okparanta. The story is set in the future and provides commentary on racism. The book follows Harry, who leaves his hometown to move to New York City and starts a relationship with Maryam, who is from Nigeria. The book uses contains elements of satire, romance, and speculative fiction, beginning in 2016 and ending in 2026.

== Plot ==
Harry Sylvester Bird follows the journey of its character, Harry, as he navigates a childhood marked by the racist environment of his hometown, Edward, Pennsylvania, characterized by racism, xenophobia, and financial instability embodied by his parents, Wayne and Chevy. Desperate to escape this suffocating atmosphere, Harry moves to New York City, seeking a place where he can truly be himself.In the vibrant chaos of New York, Harry finds love and solace in Maryam, a Nigerian woman. However, their relationship becomes strained as Maryam begins to distance herself, prompting Harry to confront his own identity and the societal forces that have shaped him.

Harry, a white man with a profound belief that he's imprisoned in the wrong racial identity and yearning to become black. Chinelo Okparanta weaves a rich description around Harry, exploring not only the fantasy driving his desires but also the painful reality animating them. The novel peels back the layers of racism, exposing its insidious presence in Harry's life and examining the deep-seated social dysfunction underlying his yearning for racial transformation.

The narrative opens with a satirical lens on Harry's troubled childhood, marked by parental neglect and racial prejudice. Set against the backdrop of a safari resort in Zanzibar, where Harry's family attempts to live out a colonial fantasy, the dysfunction within the family unit is starkly evident. As the story progresses to a struggling community in Philadelphia, economic collapse, mirroring the broader societal tensions in a politically divided United States on the brink of civil unrest. His romanticized notion of blackness becomes a distorted reflection of power and entitlement, echoing the dynamics of white supremacy.

== Characters ==
- Harry Sylvester Bird: The protagonist, a white man who believes he is meant to be black and grapples with his identity and desires.
- Harry's Parents (Wayne and Chevy): Wayne, Harry's father, is a disillusioned literature professor whose racist ideas shape the family dynamic. Chevy, Harry's mother, struggles with her own issues and exhibits coldness towards Harry.
- Maryam: A young Nigerian woman whom Harry meets and falls in love with in New York City. Their relationship forces Harry to confront his identity and desires.
- Supporting Characters (Town Residents, New York City Locals): Various characters encountered by Harry throughout the story, including residents of Edward, Pennsylvania, and individuals in New York City. They contribute to the exploration of societal tensions and racial dynamics.

== Themes ==
- Theme of Identity: At the heart of the novel is the theme of identity, particularly Harry's struggle with his own racial identity. He grapples with feeling trapped in the wrong body and yearns to become black, leading to a profound exploration of the complexities of racial identity and self-discovery.
- Theme of racism and Prejudice: The novel delves into the dark underbelly of racism and prejudice, examining how it manifests in both overt and subtle ways. From Harry's experiences of racial profiling and hatred in his hometown to his internalized racism and desire for racial metamorphosis, the story confronts the damaging effects of systemic racism on individuals and communities.
- Theme of desire and Obsession: Harry's desire to become black serves as a lens through which the novel explores themes of desire and obsession. His fixation on racial transformation reflects deeper insecurities and anxieties, leading to a destructive spiral of self-obsession and appropriation.
- Theme of family Dysfunction: The dysfunctional dynamics within Harry's family, characterized by parental neglect, verbal abuse, and racial prejudice, highlight the theme of family dysfunction. These relationships shape Harry's worldview and contribute to his internalized racism and desire for escape.
- Theme of love and Relationships: The novel also examines themes of love and relationships, particularly Harry's romantic relationship with Maryam. Their relationship forces Harry to confront his identity and desires, challenging him to reconcile his feelings with societal expectations and norms.
