= Jill Malone =

American novelist (writing 2009–2013)

Jill Malone is an American novelist. Her second novel, A Field Guide to Deception, won the 2010 Lambda Literary Award for Lesbian Fiction.

== Personal life ==
Malone spent her early childhood in Germany as an "army brat", and later lived on the east coast of the United States and in Hawaii before settling in Spokane, Washington. She is married and has a son.

== Writing ==
Malone's first novel, Red Audrey and the Roping, was about a surfer and Latin teacher, confined to bed after an accident in Hawaii. It was shortlisted for the 2010 Ferro-Grumley Award.

Her second novel, A Field Guide to Deception, won the 2010 Lambda Literary Award for Lesbian Fiction. It is set in the author's home town of Spokane and a central character had ghostwritten the field guides to mushrooms which were published under the name of her late aunt.

Her third novel, Giraffe People centers on the 15 year old daughter of an army chaplain and her developing relationships.

== Selected publications ==
- Malone, Jill (2008). Red Audrey and the Roping. Bywater Books. ISBN 978-1932859546.
- Malone, Jill (2009). A Field Guide to Deception. Bywater Books. ISBN 978-1932859706.
- Malone, Jill (2013). Giraffe People. Bywater Books. ISBN 978-1612940397.
