= Chinelo Okparanta =

Nigerian-American writer (born 1981)

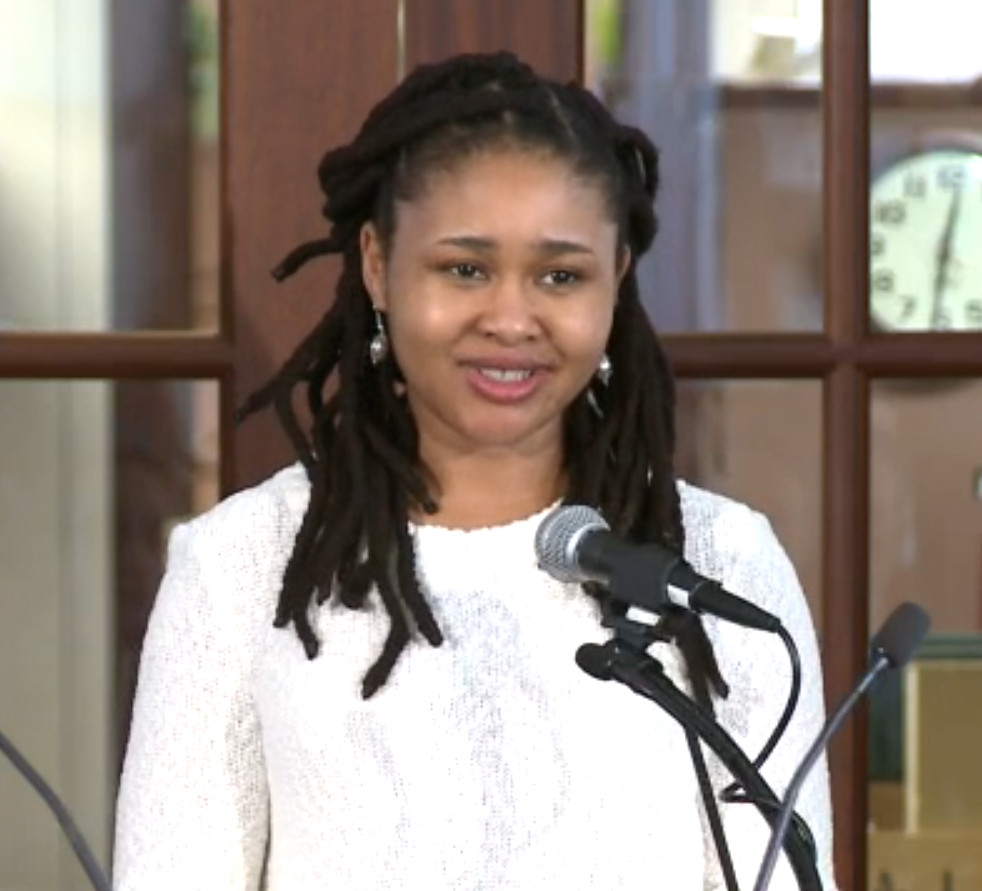
- Born: 1981 (age 44–45); Port Harcourt, Rivers State, Nigeria
- Education: Pennsylvania State University; Schreyer Honors College; Rutgers University; Iowa Writers' Workshop
- Occupations: Novelist; short story writer
- Writing career
- Notable works: Happiness, Like Water (2013); Under the Udala Trees (2015)
- Website: chinelookparanta.com

Chinelo Okparanta (born 1981) is a Nigerian-American novelist and short story writer. She was born in Port Harcourt, Nigeria, where she was raised until the age of 10, when she immigrated to the United States with her family. She grew up as a Jehovah’s Witness. In 2012 she was spotlighted as one of Granta’s New Voices.

== Early life ==
Chinelo Okparanta was born in Port Harcourt, Nigeria, and at the age of 10 migrated with her family to the US. She was educated at Pennsylvania State University (Schreyer Honors College), Rutgers University, and the Iowa Writers' Workshop.

== Career ==
Okparanta has published short stories in publications including Granta, The New Yorker, Tin House, The Kenyon Review, The Southern Review, TriQuarterly, Conjunctions, Subtropics, and The Coffin Factory. Her essays have appeared in Harper’s Bazaar, Literary Hub, AGNI, The Story Prize blog, and the University of Iowa International Writing Program blog. Okparanta has held fellowships or visiting professorships at the University of Iowa, Colgate University, Purdue University, City College of New York, Columbia University, and Middlebury College. She was associate professor of English & Creative Writing (Fiction) at Bucknell University, where she was also C. Graydon & Mary E. Rogers Faculty Research Fellow as well as Margaret Hollinshead Ley Professor in Poetry & Creative Writing until 2021. She is currently associate professor of English and Director of the Program in Creative Writing at Swarthmore College.

Her debut short story collection, Happiness, Like Water (Granta Books/Houghton Mifflin Harcourt), was longlisted for the 2013 Frank O'Connor International Short Story Award, was a finalist for the 2014 New York Public Library Young Lions Fiction Award, and won the 2014 Lambda Literary Award for Lesbian Fiction. She has been nominated for a United States Artists Fellowship and was a finalist for the 2014 Rolex Mentor and Protégé Arts Initiative in Literature. She was also a finalist for the 2013 Society of Midland Authors Award and the 2013 Caine Prize for African Writing.

Her short story "Fairness" was included in the 2013 PEN/O. Henry Prize Stories, among 20 other short stories.

Happiness, Like Water was a New York Times Book Review Editor's Choice on September 20, 2013. The collection was also listed as one of The Guardian's Best African Fiction of 2013, and in December 2014 was announced as a finalist for the Etisalat Prize for Literature. At the peak of Nigerian anti-gay legislation in 2015, Okparanta feared for her life and worried about travelling to the country for the prize ceremony.

Her first novel, Under the Udala Trees, was published in 2015. The New York Times reviewer called Okparanta "a graceful and precise writer", and The Guardian described the book as "a gripping novel about a young gay woman's coming of age in Nigeria during the Nigerian civil war" in which "Okparanta deftly negotiates a balance between a love story and a war story."

Under the Udala Trees was a New York Times Book Review Editors' Choice as well as a nominee for the 2015 Kirkus Prize in Fiction. One of NPR's "Best Books of 2015", it also made "Best of " and "Most Anticipated" lists on BuzzFeed, Wall Street Journal, The Millions, Bustle, Shelf Awareness, and Publishers Lunch. It was longlisted for the 2015 Center for Fiction First Novel Prize, nominated for the 2016 NAACP Image Award for Outstanding Literary Work – Fiction, nominated for the 2016 Hurston/Wright Legacy Award in Fiction, a finalist for the 2016 Ferro-Grumley Award, a semi-finalist for the 2016 VCU Cabell First Novelist Award, a semi-finalist for the 2016 Chautauqua Prize, and won the 2016 Lambda Literary Award for Lesbian Fiction.

Under the Udala Trees also won the 2016 Leimert Park Book Fair Jessie Redmon Fauset Book Award in Fiction and was a 2017 Amelia Bloomer Project selection of the American Library Association. It was also shortlisted for the 2017 International Dublin Literary Award.

In 2017, Okparanta won the Publishing Triangle's 2016 inaugural Betty Berzon Emerging Writer Award.

Pulse Nigeria named Under the Udala Trees one of its 10 Outstanding Nigerian Books for 2015. YNaija listed it as one of its Ten Most Notable Books of 2015. Afridiaspora listed it as one of the Best African Novels of 2015.

In April 2017, Okparanta was selected by Granta for their once-a-decade Best of Young American Novelists list.

Her essay "Trump in the Classroom" was included in the 2019 anthology New Daughters of Africa, edited by Margaret Busby.

Chinelo Okparanta was credited for being a champion for marginalized and underprivileged voices throughout her career by novelist Helon Habila. Okparanta began writing about these demographics in a time when it was dangerous to do so especially in Nigeria. In a profile in Open Country Magazine by Paula Willie-Okafor, Okparanta praised her "gentle defiance".

Zimbabwean novelist NoViolet Bulawayo said of Okparanta:

"Chinelo Okparanta is formidable force.” [...] “She doesn’t tell easy stories, she tells necessary, even earth-shifting ones—the initial reception of Under the Udala Trees is a good case of the impact of her work. We know a writer is actually doing their job right when they make people lose their shit. They are also doing an even more important job when they make others possible. In choosing to tell humanizing stories that defied the literary trends and silence around African queer life, Chinelo became an important part of the reason why we are today in a position to celebrate the flourishing of writing that rightly holds African queerness to the sun.”

== Works ==
- Happiness, Like Water (short story collection), 2013
- Under the Udala Trees (novel), 2015
- Harry Sylvester Bird (novel), 2022
- This Impossible Life (novel), 2026

== Awards ==
| Year | Nominated work | Award | Category | Result | Ref. |
|---|---|---|---|---|---|
| 2013 | "America" | Caine Prize | | Finalist | |
| 2014 | | Rolex Mentor and Protégé Arts Initiative | Literature | Finalist | |
| 2014 | "Fairness" | O. Henry Prize | | Winner | |
| 2014 | Happiness, Like Water | Lambda Literary Awards | Lesbian Fiction | Winner | |
| 2014 | Happiness, Like Water | New York Public Library Young Lions Award | | Finalist | |
| 2015 | Happiness, Like Water | Etisalat Prize for Literature | | Finalist | |
| 2015 | Under the Udala Trees | Center for Fiction First Novel Prize | | Longlisted | |
| 2016 | Under the Udala Trees | NAACP Image Awards | Outstanding Literary Work – Fiction | Finalist | |
| 2016 | | Publishing Triangle Awards | Betty Berzon Emerging Writer Award | Winner | |
| 2017 | | Granta Best of Young American Novelists | | Winner | |
| 2017 | Under the Udala Trees | International DUBLIN Literary Award | | Finalist | |
| 2017 | | Great Immigrants Award | | Winner | |
| 2023 | Harry Sylvester Bird | Aspen Words Literary Prize | | Longlisted | |
