= Blanche McCrary Boyd =

American novelist

Blanche McCrary Boyd (born August 31, 1945) is an American author. She worked as the Roman and Tatiana Weller Professor of English and Writer-in-Residence at Connecticut College for 40 years until her retirement in 2022.

== Early life and education ==
Blanche McCrary Boyd was born in Charleston, South Carolina, to Charles Fant McCrary and Mildred McDaniel. She says that growing up in South Carolina was the source of her "redneck roots." Boyd started college at Duke University, though left after getting a C+ in her first English class and being asked to leave because she was "drunk all the time". She married a man who "wouldn't put up with her drinking," and transferred to Pomona College where she graduated in 1967.

She earned her M.A. in 1971 at Stanford University. At Stanford, she relapsed into her alcoholism, started taking drugs, and realized she was a lesbian.

== Career ==
Boyd wrote her first novel in hopes of combatting her lesbianism, in a sense, or at least to make something sad out of it. Nerves was published in 1973. Its publication did not cure her internalized homophobia, she realized, so she soon left her husband.

Her second novel was written under similar pretenses. Boyd thought publication might help her with her addictions. Mourning the Death of Magic was published in 1977. Boyd has since disavowed these two novels as "“talented but not good, because I was still playing my violin about the sad songs of life.”

After Mourning the Death of Magic, Boyd had a brief stint as a rock and roll critic.

The Redneck Way of Knowledge was published in 1982, her first work after getting clean. In the same year, she began teaching at Connecticut College.

In 1991, she published The Revolution of Little Girls to great acclaim. It won the 1992 Ferro-Grumley award for women.

Terminal Velocity, the follow-up to The Revolution of Little Girls, was published in 1997, and it was called “A rollicking, kaleidoscopic trip through the drug-tinged lesbian-feminist counter-culture of the 1970s”.

Boyd won a Guggenheim Fellowship in 1993–1994, a National Endowment for the Arts Fiction Fellowship in 1988, a Creative Writing Fellowship from the South Carolina Arts Commission in 1982–1983 and a Wallace Stegner Fellowship in Creative Writing from Stanford University in 1967–1968. She was also won the Lambda Literary Award that same year. She was nominated for the Lambda Award for Lesbian Fiction again in 1997.

In 2018, she published the third installment in the Revolution of Little Girls trilogy, Tomb of the Unknown Racist. In 2019 she was named as a finalist for the PEN/Faulkner Award for Fiction for this novel.

Boyd worked as the Roman and Tatiana Weller Professor of English and Writer-in-Residence at Connecticut College up until her retirement in 2022. During her time at Connecticut College she educated other female authors such as Ann Napolitano, Sloane Crosley, Jessica Soffer, and Hannah Tinti.

== Personal life ==
After leaving her husband, Boyd moved to Vermont to protest the Vietnam War and live on a commune. She continued drinking and doing drugs, until eventually she got arrested. She left Vermont a year and a half later, and then moved to New York.

After her stint as a rock and roll critic, Boyd moved back to South Carolina, where she continued to struggle with drug and alcohol addition until 1980, when she says she had a moment of clarity when she watched her friend shoot herself. Boyd abandoned alcohol in 1981.

Boyd met a woman in the late 90s that she "didn't screw things up with". They got married in Connecticut in 2009 and now have twins.

== Works ==
Novels:

- Nerves (Daughters, Inc., 1973)
- Mourning the Death of Magic (Macmillan, 1977)
- The Revolution of Little Girls (Vintage, 1991)
- Terminal Velocity (Vintage, 1997)
- Tomb of the Unknown Racist: A novel (Counterpoint, 2018)

Essays:

- The Redneck Way of Knowledge: Down-home Tales (Vintage, 1978; 2nd ed., 1994)
