= Prostitution in Jamaica =

Prostitution in Jamaica is illegal but widely tolerated, especially in tourist areas. UNAIDS estimate there to be 18,696 prostitutes in the country.

The island is a destination for sex tourism. The Terry McMillan novel, and later film, How Stella Got Her Groove Back, was based on female sex tourism in Jamaica. Transactional sex also occurs.

Sex trafficking is a problem in the country.

== Prostitution in practice ==
Female prostitutes solicit from their homes or join customers in their hotel rooms or private homes. A number of prostitutes dance in adult night clubs and a percentage of them are from other countries. These imported prostitutes work in the more sophisticated night clubs in Kingston, which cater mainly to tourists, foreign workers, diplomats and affluent locals. Other clubs have mostly local prostitutes, some of whom have regular day jobs. In Ocho Rios the prostitutes pay the night club owner a fee to use the night clubs to find clients.

Massage parlours in Jamaica sometimes operate as fronts for brothels. These are well advertised in local pornographic magazines and in official newspapers. Dancers in lap dancing and striptease establishments sometimes offer sexual services as a sideline.

Gay prostitutes can be found working in hotels as entertainment coordinators. Blatant male prostitution is rare, since the homophobic nature of the country makes male prostitutes generally conduct their business in more subtle ways. Still, some male prostitutes have been seen soliciting in the streets.

In the tourist areas of Montego Bay and Ocho Rios, prostitutes, and other citizens, sometimes solicit themselves in the hopes of gaining a connection via their client, with whom they will later travel to a developed country. Sexual favors are often the result and money will be exchanged. Some of these result in long-term relationships. In Ocho Rios, crew members of cruise ships visit lounges near the pier where sex workers have rooms booked.

Some sex workers book rooms in all-inclusive resorts to obtain clients from amongst the tourists.

== Child prostitution ==
Economic difficulties and social pressures contribute to the prevalence of child prostitution. A 2001 study funded by ILO-IPEC found that children as young as 10 years old engage in prostitution catering to tourists. Young girls are hired by "go-go" clubs or massage parlors. Children are also trafficked internally for sexual exploitation. Street children also engage in prostitution.

== Current situation ==
Prostitution is currently still an activity in Jamaica. The idea of "fast money" is in high demand when dealing with underground sex tourism. Masking this act inside of massage parlours only makes it easier for young teens to exploit themselves.

Prostitution has become even more secretive and questionable as it continues. Not only do many hide their identity and lifestyle, but there is some indication that the young girls are being held against their will. This, in turn, could be deemed as human trafficking. (A careful read of the article cited here shows a passing conjecture of an uninvestigated possibility of captive girls based only on the finding of a few padlocked rooms which might have simply been empty locked rooms. If Wikipedia ever decides to remove citations of flimsy conjectures from articles, this one might be considered for removal in all translations of this article.)

The Jamaica SW Coalition has been working with sex workers in Jamaica for over ten years. the work involved engaging with the sex work community education them on basic human rights using the traditional peer to peer education model. The Jamaica SW Coalition is currently advocating for the decriminalization of sex work.

== Sex trafficking ==
Jamaica is a source and destination country for adults and children subjected to sex trafficking. Sex trafficking of Jamaican women and children, including boys, reportedly occurs on streets and in nightclubs, bars, massage parlors, hotels, and private homes, including in resort towns. Traffickers increasingly use social media platforms to recruit victims. Jamaican citizens have been subjected to sex trafficking abroad, including in other Caribbean countries, Canada, the United States, and the United Kingdom.

=== Government involvement ===
Jamaica's government claims to have a plan to eliminate human trafficking. Jamaica is currently in Tier 2 status, meaning that their government does not fully comply with the minimum standard set out in the U.S. Trafficking Victims Prevention Act, but that they have made significant progress in their attempts to meet those standards.
