= Kristen Arnett =

American fiction author and essayist (born 1980)

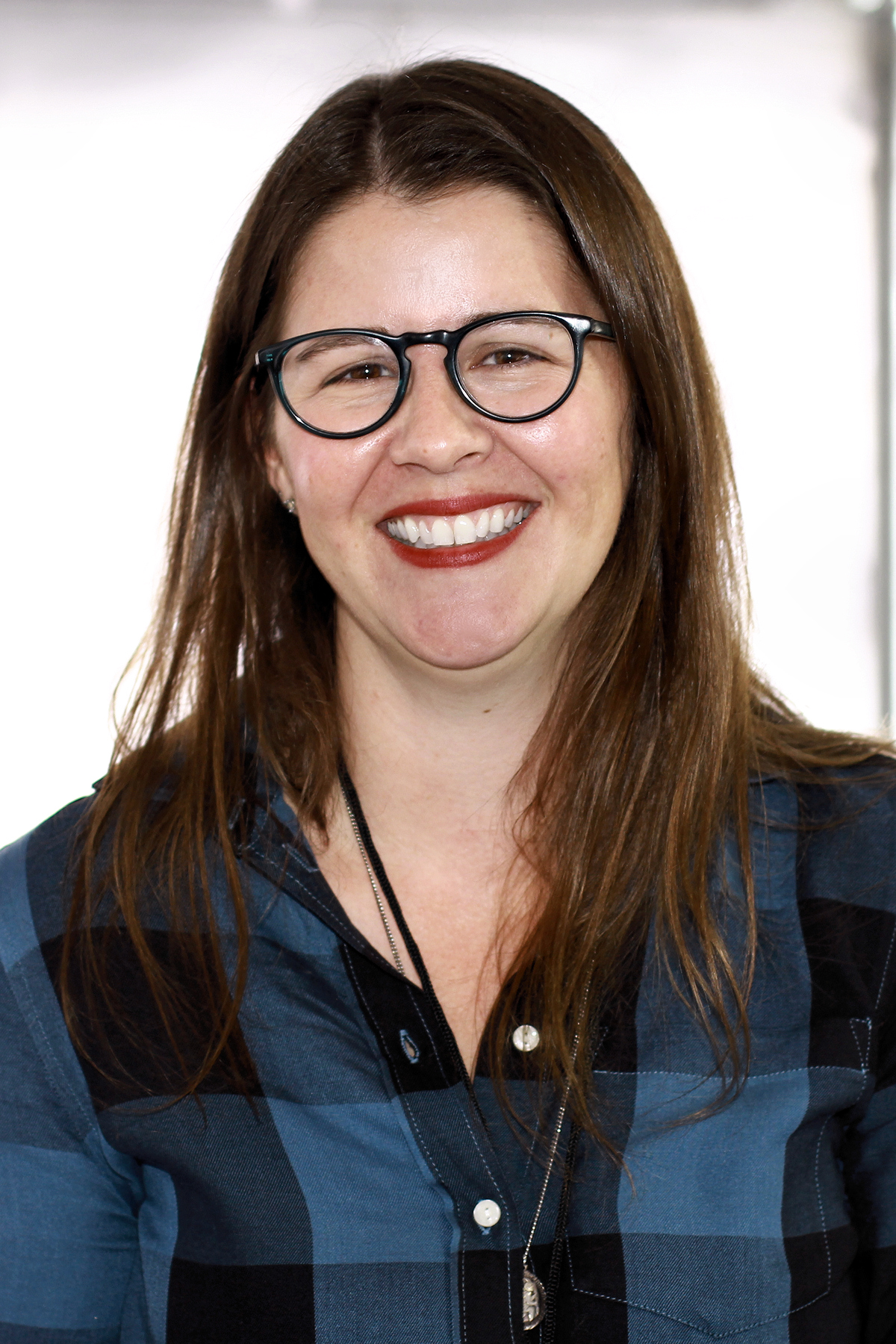
- Arnett at the 2019 Texas Book Festival
- Born: December 16, 1980 (age 45); Orlando, Florida, U.S.
- Education: Rollins College (BA); Florida State University (MS)
- Occupations: Librarian, writer

Kristen Arnett (born December 16, 1980) is an American fiction author and essayist. Her debut novel, Mostly Dead Things, was a New York Times bestseller.

== Early life and education ==
Arnett was born and raised in Orlando, Florida, where she attended Winter Park High School. She graduated from Rollins College with a bachelor's degree in English and received her master's degree in library and information science from Florida State University. Arnett was a fellow in the Lambda Literary Writers Retreat for Emerging LGBT Voices in 2013.

== Career ==
Arnett was a librarian at Rollins College and the Dwayne O. Andreas School of Law at Barry University. She is a columnist for Literary Hub and was selected as a Shearing Fellow at the Black Mountain Institute for the spring 2020 semester.

=== Writing ===
Her first collection of short fiction, Felt in the Jaw, was published by Split Lip Press and received the 2017 Coil Book Award. Arnett is a self-described "7-Eleven scholar" and celebrated the debut of Felt in the Jaw at a 7-Eleven store in Orlando. The short story collection focuses on living as a lesbian in Florida.

Arnett's debut novel, Mostly Dead Things, which was published by Tin House in June 2019, was a New York Times bestseller and received critical acclaim. The novel was heralded by literary critic Parul Sehgal as her "song of the summer" and by The New Yorker's book critic Katy Waldman as one of the best books of 2019. The book features an openly lesbian main character who runs her family's taxidermy shop after her father dies by suicide.

Arnett's novel, With Teeth, was published by Penguin Random House in 2022.

Arnett's stories have appeared in online and print publications including Guernica, North American Review, Oprah Daily, and Gay Magazine. Her essays have been published in various venues including The Rumpus, Electric Literature, and Orlando Weekly.

Arnett's third novel, Stop Me If You've Heard This One, was published in March 2025 by Riverhead Books. It was shortlisted for the Published Novels category of the 2025 Comedy Women in Print Prize.

== Personal life ==
Arnett married Kayla Upadhyaya in 2024.

=== "Marvin" tweet ===
In 2018, Arnett tweeted, "This morning at 7-eleven I saw a lizard next to the coffee maker and the cashier said 'no worries that's just Marvin, he likes the smell.'" 7-Eleven's official Twitter account replied to the tweet, which ultimately garnered over 300,000 likes, asking "Oh no! Can you DM us with the store location you visited so we can check in on Marvin? Thank you!" to which Arnett replied "no way I'm not gonna narc on my buddy." Screengrabs of the exchange have been widely reposted as a classic piece of digital culture. When a 6 ft (1.8 m) monitor lizard visited a convenience store in Nakhon Pathom, Thailand in 2021 and started climbing up the shelves heading toward the ceiling, the video was posted to Twitter and a user replied, "That's just Marvin, he likes the smell."
