= Shay Youngblood =

American playwright, author and educator (1959–2024)

- Born: Sharon Ellen Youngblood; October 16, 1959; Columbus, Georgia, U.S.
- Died: June 11, 2024 (aged 64); Peachtree City, Georgia, U.S.
- Education: Clark Atlanta University (BA); Brown University (MFA)
- Occupations: Playwright, novelist, author, artist
- Notable work: Shakin' the Mess Outta Misery, Talking Bones, Black Girl in Paris
- Website: www.shayyoungblood.com

Sharon Ellen Youngblood (October 16, 1959 – June 11, 2024) was an American playwright, author of short stories and novels, artist, and educator. Her works explored themes of identity, community, and resilience, giving voice to generations of African-American women.

== Biography ==
Shay Youngblood was born in Columbus, Georgia, in 1959, the only child of Mary Lee Kemp and Lonnie Willis Crosby. Her surname came from one of her mother's husbands. Much of Youngblood's fiction mirrors her own life experiences. Like many of her heroines, Youngblood herself was an orphan at an early age. Her mother died when she was about two years old, and she was raised by a community family that included women who resemble the characters depicted in her books and plays.

Youngblood was one of the first people in her family to attend college. While earning her bachelor's degree in mass communication at Clark-Atlanta University, she participated in a service project in Haiti. Her work in Haiti heightened her awareness of the injustice suffered by poor people in many places around the world. Immediately after graduating she joined the Peace Corps, and in 1981 she served as an agricultural information officer in Dominica. She then returned to Atlanta, where she worked at Charis Books & More, one of the oldest feminist bookstores in the country, and where she began her writing career.

When her play Shakin' the Mess Outta Misery was optioned by Sidney Poitier for a film, she used the money to attend Brown University, where she studied under Paula Vogel and Anna Deavere Smith and earned her MFA in Creative Writing in 1993.

Youngblood was gay. Her marriage to Annette Lawrence, in 2010, ended in divorce in 2020.

Youngblood died from ovarian cancer near Atlanta, on June 11, 2024, at the age of 64.

== Career ==
Youngblood is recognized as a poet, playwright, and fiction writer, and she also wrote, produced, and directed two short videos. Her play Shakin' the Mess Outta Misery, which first premiered at Atlanta's Horizon Theater in 1988, follows a community of black women who nurture a young woman named Daughter, sharing their folk wisdom, biblical teachings, and life experiences. It celebrates the strength and wisdom of African-American women overcoming oppression and violence in the segregated South through interconnected stories of endurance, humor, and perseverance. Reworking the characters of the play, she published The Big Mama Stories in 1989, which is the closest to autobiographical of all of her works. This compilation of short stories focuses on the coming of age of a poor, young African-American girl named Chile. Chile's biological mother, Fannie Mae, has died, and Chile and her brother go to live with a woman called Big Mama, who raises the children with the help of the entire community.

In a brief conversation with Edward Albee early in her career, he advised her to diversify her creative pursuits beyond playwriting, suggesting that she also explore novels, poetry, non-fiction, screenplays, and painting. She followed his advice. She supported herself by painting and cleaning houses while consistently writing, balancing day jobs with periods of travel or artist residencies. She noted that her long-term association with the Yaddo artist colony was particularly fruitful, allowing her to accomplish more in a month there than in a year at home.

She is also known for her works Soul Kiss, her first novel which explores identity and belonging highlighting the complexities of race, class, and gender in 1960s Georgia and Black Girl in Paris, which draws from her experiences in Paris and was motivated by her desire to inspire boldness in others. Influenced by figures like James Baldwin and Josephine Baker, she traveled to Paris with only $200 and limited French. There, she encountered black women with similar dreams of writing novels, making films, and experiencing the expatriate life they had read about in books such as Langston Hughes' The Big Sea. Despite their naivety, they survived and had their own adventures.

Her fiction, articles, and essays have been published in Oprah magazine, Good Housekeeping, BlackBook, and Essence magazines, among many other publications. Her plays – Amazing Grace, Shakin' the Mess Outta Misery and Talking Bones – have been widely produced. She also completed a radio play, Explain Me the Blues, for WBGO Public Radio's Jazz Play Series.

Youngblood was a board member of both Yaddo and the Authors Guild. She taught creative writing at City College of New York and was the 2002-2003 John and Renee Grisham Writer in Residence at the University of Mississippi. She also taught writing at the Syracuse Community Writer's Project, playwriting at the Rhode Island Adult Institution for Women and Brown University, and creative writing at Texas A&M University. In 2013, she became the Dallas Museum of Art's first Writer in Residence. She also worked as a "Career Advisor to Creatives", where she helped artists, writers and musicians plan their careers, teaching them skills for navigating the job market and networking.

== Selected works ==
- Youngblood, Shay (1989). The Big Mama Stories. Firebrand Books. ISBN 978-0932379573.
- Youngblood, Shay (1994) [1988]. Shakin' the Mess Outta Misery. Dramatic Publishing Company. ISBN 978-0871292971.
- Youngblood, Shay (1994). Talking Bones. Dramatic Publishing Company. ISBN 978-0871292988.
- Youngblood, Shay (1998). Soul Kiss. The Women's Press. ISBN 978-1573226585.
- Youngblood, Shay (2000). Black Girl in Paris. Riverhead Books. ISBN 978-1573221511.
- Youngblood, Shay (2013). Black Power Barbie: Love lives of heroes. Blue Cloud Press. ISBN 978-1482642292.
- Youngblood, Shay (2013). Square Blues. CreateSpace Independent Publishing Platform. ISBN 978-1482332940.
- Youngblood, Shay (2022). Mama's Home. Random House Children's Books. ISBN 978-0593180228.
- Youngblood, Shay (2023). A Family Prayer. Random House Children's Books. ISBN 978-0593234709.

== Awards ==
Shay Youngblood has been the recipient of numerous grants and awards including a Pushcart Prize for her short story "Born With Religion." She has also received the Lorraine Hansberry Playwriting Award for her play Talking Bones, the Astraea Writers' Award for Fiction, a 2004 New York Foundation for the Arts Sustained Achievement Award, and several NAACP Theatre Awards.
