= Emma Benn =

American biostatistician

Emma Katherine Tara Benn is an American biostatistician whose research includes causal inference in health disparities as a way to help find targets for intervention against these disparities. She works at the Icahn School of Medicine at Mount Sinai, where she is an associate professor in the Department of Population Health Science, affiliated with the Center for Biostatistics. She is also associate dean of faculty well-being and development, and the founding director of the Center for Scientific Diversity at the Icahn School.

== Education and career ==
Benn is African American, and is originally from Bryn Mawr, Pennsylvania; her mother worked at Bryn Mawr College and as a gifted mathematics student she had frequent contact with Bryn Mawr mathematics professors including Helen G. Grundman. She was an undergraduate of Swarthmore College, where she found African American mathematician Garikai Campbell as a mentor and role model. She graduated in 2004 with a bachelor's degree in chemistry, and earned a master's degree and doctorate in public health at the Columbia University Mailman School of Public Health. At Columbia, she co-founded the Biostatistics Epidemiology Summer Training (BEST) Diversity Program.

In 2012, after completing her DrPH, she joined the Icahn School of Medicine at Mount Sinai.

== Recognition ==
In 2022, Benn was elected as a Fellow of the American Statistical Association. She was selected as a fellow of the Association for Women in Mathematics in 2023.
