= Carol Anshaw =

American novelist and short story writer

- Born: March 22, 1946 (age 80); Grosse Pointe, Michigan, U.S.
- Education: Michigan State University (BA); Vermont College of Fine Arts (MFA)
- Occupations: Novelist; short story writer; painter
- Spouse: Jessie Ewing (m. 2014, divorced)
- Writing career
- Language: English
- Website: www.carolanshaw.com

Carol Anshaw (born March 22, 1946) is an American novelist and short story writer. Publishing Triangle named her debut novel, Aquamarine, one of "The Triangle's 100 Best" gay and lesbian novels. Her novels have won the Carl Sandburg Award, the Society of Midland Authors Award and have been finalists four times for Lambda Literary Awards, and Lucky in the Corner won the 2003 Ferro-Grumley Award.

== Personal life ==
Carol Anshaw was born on March 22, 1946, in Grosse Pointe, Michigan. Her mother was Virginia Anshaw Stanley and her father was Henry G. Stanley. During Anshaw's childhood and adolescence, her family lived in Michigan and Florida.

Anshaw received her Bachelor of Arts degree from Michigan State University in 1968. After graduation, she moved to Chicago. She acquired her Master of Fine Arts degree at Vermont College of Fine Arts in 1992.

In 1969, she married Charles White. The couple divorced in 1985.

Since 1996 Anshaw has been partners with the documentary maker and photographer, Jessie Ewing. They were married on May 25, 2014. Now, the couple divides their time between Chicago and Amsterdam.

== Career ==
Anshaw has been writing fiction since 1972. Her stories have appeared in Story magazine, Tin House, and have been selected three times for inclusion in The Best American Stories [1992, 1994 2012]'and Do Me: Tales of Sex and Love from Tin House.

She has published five novels. Her first, the critically acclaimed Aquamarine (1992) explores one life lived on parallel paths.

For her novels Anshaw has been awarded a National Endowment for the Arts Literature Fellowship; an Illinois Arts Council Fellowship; a Carl Sandburg Award, a Ferro-Grumley Award and Society of Midland Authors Award.

Perhaps Anshaw's most popular novel,Carry the One (2012), has been highly regarded as a portrait of grief and American culture. The novel received warm endorsements from Emma Donoghue and Alison Bechdel. Set mainly in Chicago, Anshaw deftly takes the narrative's point of view from character to character, showing "how time affects relationships, tipping emotional dominoes one way or another within a family or circle of friends."

For her criticism in the Village Voice, she won the National Book Critics Circle Citation for Excellence in Reviewing.

Anshaw was, for 20 years, on the faculty of the MFA program at SAIC, the School of the Art Institute of Chicago.

She is also a painter, and is currently working on a sequence of paintings of the English Channel swimmer, Gertrude Ederle. "Walking Through Leaves," her painted biography of the novelist and poet, Vita Sackville-West was put up in November 2013 at Rockford University, Rockford, IL.

== Awards ==
Publishing Triangle named Aquamarine one of "The Triangle's 100 Best" gay and lesbian novels of the 1990s.

- 1993: Society of Midland Authors Award for Fiction for Aquamarine
- 2003: Ferro-Grumley Award for Lucky in the Corner
- 2013: San Francisco Book Festival for General Fiction for Carry the One

== Works ==
- Aquamarine (1992)
- Seven Moves (1996)
- Lucky in the Corner (2002)
- Carry the One (2012)
- Right After the Weather (2019)

=== Anthology contributions ===
- The Best American Short Stories 1994, edited by Tobias Wolff and Katrina Kenison (1994)
- The Best American Short Stories 1998, edited by Garrison Keillor and Katrina Kenison(1998)
- The Best American Short Stories 2012, edited by Tom Perrotta and Heidi Pitlor (2012)
