= Rebecca Brown (author) =

American writer, essayist, and educator

- Born: 1956 (age 69–70); San Diego, California, U.S.
- Education: George Washington University (BA); University of Virginia (MFA)
- Writing career
- Notable work: The Gifts of the Body

Rebecca Brown (born 1956) is an American novelist, essayist, playwright, artist, and professor. She was the first writer in residence at Richard Hugo House, co-founder of the Jack Straw Writers Program, and served as the creative director of literature at Centrum in Port Townsend, Washington from 2005 to 2009. Brown's best-known work is her novel The Gifts of the Body, which won a Lambda Literary Award in 1994. Rebecca Brown is an Emeritus faculty member in the MFA in Creative Writing Program at Goddard College in Plainfield, Vermont and is also a multi-media artist whose work has been displayed in galleries such as the Frye Art Museum.

== Early life ==
Brown was born into a Navy family that moved often; she lived in California, Texas, Kansas, and Spain. She has a brother and sister. She earned a bachelor's in English from George Washington University and a Master's in Creative Writing from the University of Virginia. After finishing her MFA in the early 1980s, she settled in Seattle before moving to live in London and Italy for several years. She returned to Seattle in 1990 and has been there since. Brown's mother, Barbara Ann Wildman Brown, died from cancer in 1997; the experience of being her caretaker inspired the book Excerpts from a Family Medical Dictionary. Her father, who left the family when Brown was a teenager, died from a heart attack shortly after her mother; his death inspired The End of Youth.

== Career ==
Brown's works include collections of essays and short stories, a fictionalized autobiography, a modern bestiary, a memoir in the guise of a medical dictionary, a libretto for a dance opera, a play, and various kinds of fantasy. Brown has "a uniquely recognizable voice, writing as she does in a stark style that combines the minimalism of Ernest Hemingway with some of the incantatory rhythms of Gertrude Stein." She shares some personal preferences with the latter.

Brown wrote and performed her one-woman production Monstrous, a look at some of literature's monsters and how they don't fit anywhere, at the Northwest Film Forum in 2013. She has also written a play, The Toaster, which debuted at Seattle's New City Theater in 2005, and a dance opera called The Onion Twins for the BetterBiscuitDance Company. In 2001, the About Face Theater in Chicago adapted The Terrible Girls into a play. New Short Fiction Series in Los Angeles adapted four different stories from The End of Youth to stage in 2003.

She has been part of the faculties of the University of Washington Bothell, Evergreen State College, and Goddard College and has taught at Naropa University's Jack Kerouac School and Pacific Lutheran University. In addition to Hugo House, Brown has also done residencies at Yaddo, Hawthornden Castle, MacDowell, Centrum, Millay Arts, and Hedgebrook.

== Personal life ==
Brown lives in Capitol Hill, Seattle with her wife Chris Galloway and their cats. She has been a practicing Roman Catholic since 2012.

== Honors and awards ==
In 2005, she was awarded the Stranger Genius Award and given a $5,000 grant.

| Book | Year | Award name | Award Body | Result | Reference |
|---|---|---|---|---|---|
| The Gifts of the Body | 1994 | Lambda Literary Award | Lambda Literary Foundation | Winner | |
| The Gifts of the Body | 1995 | Pacific Northwest Booksellers Award | Pacific Northwest Booksellers Association | Winner | |
| The Gifts of the Body | 1995 | Washington State Governor’s Award | Governor of Washington and Washington State Library | Winner | |
| The Gifts of the Body | 1995 | Boston Book Review Award | Boston Review | Winner | |
| Excerpts From A Family Medical Dictionary | 2003 | Washington State Book Award | Washington Center for the Book, Washington State Library, and the Seattle Public Library | Winner | |
| The Dogs: A Modern Bestiary | 1998 | Lambda Literary Award | Lambda Literary Foundation | Nominee | |
| The Last Time I Saw You | 2007 | Ferro-Grumley Award | Publishing Triangle | Nominee | |
| American Romances | 2010 | Judy Grahn Award | Publishing Triangle | Winner | |

== Selected works ==
| No. | Title | Publisher | Date | Length | ISBN |
|---|---|---|---|---|---|
| 1 | The Evolution of Darkness and Other Stories | Brilliance Books | 1984 | 185 pp (paperback) | 978-0946189854 |
| 2 | The Haunted House | Picador | 1986 | 140 pp (hardcover) | 978-0330291750 |
Robin Daley’s childhood is dominated by a sense of impermanence: Her hard-drinking father disappears as suddenly and unexpectedly as he arrives. Her adulthood offers an escape, but strange things happen when the dark corners and locked rooms of family life are revealed.
| 3 | The Children's Crusade | Pan Books | 1989 | 119 pp (paperback) | 978-0330305297 |
The narrator relates her childhood memories of parental and sibling relations, with all of their bewildering boundaries and limits, and finds herself drawn into a bizarre custody battle which separates her from her brother.
| 4 | The Terrible Girls | Picador | 1990 | 125 pp (hardcover) | 978-0330314794 |
The girls on the prowl in The Terrible Girls are indeed terrible—relentless in love, ruthless in betrayal. These thematically linked stories depict a contemporary Gothic world in which body parts are traded for love, wounds never heal, and self-sacrifice is often the only way out.
| 5 | Annie Oakley's Girl | City Lights Publishers | 1993 | 154 pp (paperback) | 978-0872862791 |
Brown's fourth... mixes fantasy, conjecture, and some realism in seven stories that feature atmospheric neo-feminist allegories and fables.
| 6 | The Gifts of the Body | HarperCollins | 1995 | 176 pp (paperback) | 978-0060926533 |
Delivering a voice of inspiration that transcends the AIDS epidemic, this emotionally wrenching novel speaks to everyone who has ever given or received the gift of compassion. A volunteer health-care worker delivers small gifts of daily life--a sponge bath, a hot meal--and gains in return an opportunity to watch and to witness, to mourn and to remember.
| 7 | What Keeps Me Here | HarperCollins | 1996 | 136 pp (hardcover) | 978-0060174408 |
What Keeps Me Here is a collection of stories about relationships - between childhood friends, between lovers, between the warring parts of the self.
| 8 | The Dogs: A Modern Bestiary | City Lights Publishers | 2001 | 166 pp (paperback) | 978-0872863446 |
The nameless narrator of The Dogs: A Modern Bestiary lives in her studio apartment with a pack of Doberman pinchers. The dogs, led by the cruel, charismatic bitch named Miss Dog, alternate between being brutal attack animals and loyal companions, being real and otherworldly.
| 9 | Excerpts from a Family Medical Dictionary | University of Wisconsin Press | 2001 | 113 pp (paperback) | 978-0299189709 |
Excerpts from a Family Medical Dictionary is an intimate, exquisite, and true account of what it is to help a parent die. After her mother was diagnosed with terminal cancer, former home care worker and award-winning writer Rebecca Brown cared for her mother during the last six months of her life.
| 10 | The End of Youth | City Lights Publishers | 2003 | 123 pp (paperback) | 978-0872864184 |
The End of Youth is a collection of 13 linked stories, essays and rants, about carrying on after youth's hope is gone.
| 11 | The Last Time I Saw You | City Lights Publishers | 2006 | 97 pp (paperback) | 978-0872864474 |
Brown's imaginative, fierce collection of 12 stories... evokes the painful detritus of lesbian love affairs long over and the trickiness of memory.
| 12 | American Romances | City Lights Publishers | 2009 | 162 pp (paperback) | 978-0872864986 |
This collection of mordant, poignant and playful essays shows Rebecca Brown at the height of her imaginative and intuitive powers. A wry and incisive social and literary critique is couched in a gonzo mix of pop culture, autobiography, fiction, literary history, misremembered movie plots and fantasy that plays with the notion of what it is to be "American."
| 13 | Not Heaven, Somewhere Else | Tarpaulin Sky Press | 2018 | 76 pp (paperback) | 978-1939460189 |
Novel- and essayist Rebecca Brown's thirteenth book is narrative cycle that revamps old fairy tales, movies, and myths, as it leads the reader from darkness to light, from harshness to love, from where we are to where we might go.
