= Babyji =

2005 novel by Abha Dawesar

- Author: Abha Dawesar
- Language: English
- Publisher: Anchor Books
- Publication date: 2005
- ISBN: 1-4000-3456-6
- OCLC: 55657970
- Dewey Decimal: 813/.6 22
- LC Class: PS3554.A9423 B33 2005

Babyji is a novel by Abha Dawesar first published in 2005. Set in 1980s Delhi, India, it recounts the coming of age and the sexual adventures and fantasies of a 16-year-old bespectacled schoolgirl, the only child of a Brahmin family. The three simultaneous "affairs" she has in the course of the novel are all secret, and all with members of her own gender: two with older women and one with a classmate.

The title of the book points to the old custom of venerating an elder by referring to them with the suffix -ji added to their name (cf. "Gandhiji"). In the novel it is the family servant who, though she is older than the daughter of the house, out of deference toward the latter's higher caste addresses her as "Babyji". ("Was I a baby or a Didi? Babyji was such a contradiction in terms, conveying too much respect that the age of a child doesn't warrant.")

Babyji is the winner of the 2005 Lambda Literary Award for Lesbian Fiction and of the 2006 Stonewall Book Award for Fiction.

== Plot summary ==
Sixteen-year-old Anamika Sharma is a bright young student aware of her privileged position within Indian society. Head Prefect at her school, she aspires to graduate with excellent grades so as to be able to go on to college in the United States to study physics. Anamika is confident that she will be able to get in, but feels conflicted about contributing to the country's brain drain; ultimately, she concludes that it would be best to return to her native country after the completion of her studies to contribute to the modernization of traditional Indian society and breaking down the rigid caste system.

The novel is set against the backdrop of the protests against the recommendations of the Mandal commission, which trigger several acts of self-immolation. In particular, classes are suspended for weeks on end, and Anamika finds more time than usual to pursue her private interests.

She spends much of her time with Tripta Adhikari, a free-thinking divorced lady about twice her age whom she calls "India". India is a wealthy academic who lives in Anamika's neighbourhood, and occasionally Anamika sneaks out of the house when her parents have already gone to bed to spend the night with her new-found friend. Mr and Mrs Sharma know about Tripta Adhikari but naturally assume that the latter has a maternal relationship with their daughter, while India herself knows very well that what she is doing amounts to statutory rape. Anamika's parents even let her go on a short holiday to Kasauli with India and two of her friends.

Also in Kasauli, Anamika is horrified to see that she is expected to drink beer—which she does—and that one evening the grown-ups with whom she is travelling not only gather together to smoke a joint but also offer her one as well. In the end Anamika politely refuses.

Anamika's second "liaison" is with Rani, the family's live-in servant. Illiterate, only able to speak Hindi, and regularly beaten up by her alcoholic husband, 23-year-old Rani is rescued from a jhuggi by the Sharmas. However, as their apartment does not have a servant's bedroom, Rani is ordered to sleep on the floor of Anamika's room. This, of course, provides the girl with ample opportunity to explore submissive Rani's perfect body, in spite of the servant's occasional tentative protestations that "Babyji", for her own good, should seek the love of a boy her own age. Anamika, however, sticks with her choice, rejects male advances, and, despite the danger of being stigmatised as someone who associates with a person from a much lower caste, is even prepared to teach Rani some English.

Finally, she makes several passes at Sheela, one of the girls in her class. Although their male classmates' consider Sheela much prettier than Anamika, Sheela herself is quite unaware of her budding beauty and the boyfriends she could have if she wanted to. She does question whether her intimacies with another girl are morally okay but does not recognize the seriousness of Anamika's endeavours. When Anamika asks her if she will be her "mistress" when they grow up she replies with a non-committal "Maybe". Only when Anamika goes too far and forces herself on Sheela does the latter reject her, at least for the time being.

Though she likens herself to a playboy, she always makes sure that each of her partners believes she is the only one for her.

== The presentation of Indian society in Babyji ==
In Babyji, Dawesar paints a Delhi of crime, rape, dirt, blackouts, backwardness, residual colonialism, domestic violence, and arranged marriages, a city where promising young people often see their only option as going to the United States, thus contributing to the brain drain and setting in motion a vicious circle. In contrast to this scenario is Anamika herself, an intellectual who devours books—among other authors, she has read Dostoevsky, Sartre, Kundera and Bradbury and reads Nabokov's Lolita during her trip to Kasauli—and at school excels at maths and physics. At the same time her moral relativism is of a youthful kind, where every new experience she has is likely to trigger a change in her outlook on the human condition.

Her lesbianism is a foil for traditional Indian thought and values. Anamika resists all advances by men, in particular those by her classmate Vidur's father, who, at their first encounter, asks that she call him Adit rather than Uncleji and wants to meet her again, alone. India teaches her that being gay is a "Western construct," that sexuality is a continuum rather than a binary phenomenon. Anamika's mind, however, seems already set. She prefers "Sheela's smoothness to Vidur's hairiness," sees herself as predator Humbert Humbert and all-too-willing victim rolled into one, and as a grown-up wants to have "a big harem full of women".

She also realizes that feminism in India still has a long way to go in order to catch up with developments in the West. People like Rani have been led to believe that "women are not meant to enjoy," and when Adit talks about his wife he calls her a "power woman" because she works for American Express. The dark side of growing up female in India is further demonstrated in the episode where Anamika and Sheela, having missed the school bus, have to take a crowded public bus to get home from school and fall prey to frotteurs.

== Reception ==
A Publishers Weekly review states, "Despite its meandering path, the novel achieves an impressive balance between moral inquiry and decadent pleasure, pleasing the intellect and the senses—if not necessarily the heart—of the open-minded reader." Melissa Price writes for the San Francisco Chronicle, "Like Anamika's quest for new and improved experiences, Dawesar's narrative is sometimes rushed, particularly during the last third of the book, which is more enervating than involving. In "Babyji's" final pages, Anamika's revelation that her world is on the verge of opening up in exciting and significant ways isn't moving so much as it is the last plot-point." A review in Autostraddle states, "Anamika is a delightful, charming character, wise in some ways and incredibly naïve in others as teens tend to be." ZEE5 describes the novel as "a bold depiction of modern lesbian desires."

== See also ==
- Bildungsroman
- Indian English literature
- Indian diaspora
