= Lucy Jane Bledsoe =

American novelist

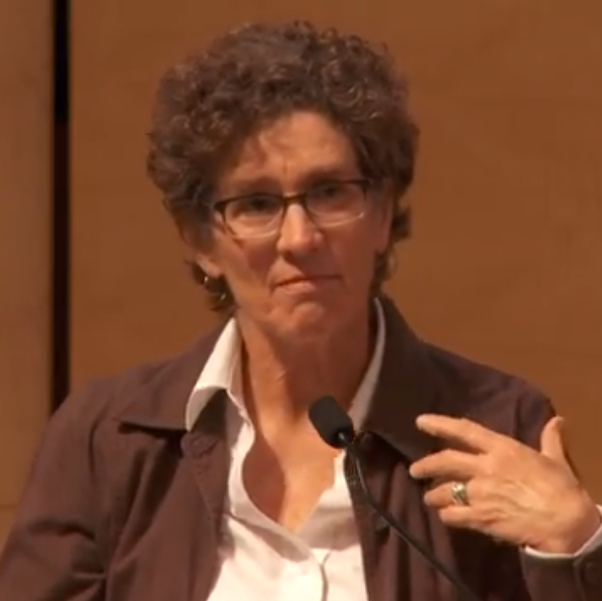
- In a discussion at the San Francisco Public Library in 2016
- Born: February 1, 1957 (age 69); Portland, Oregon, U.S.
- Occupations: Novelist, science writer
- Writing career
- Genres: Fiction, nonfiction
- Subjects: LGBT literature, family relationships, adventure
- Website: www.lucyjanebledsoe.com/index.htm

Lucy Jane Bledsoe (born February 1, 1957) is an American novelist who often writes about the intersection of family, wilderness and survival.

She is a six-time finalist for the Lambda Literary Award and a three-time finalist for the Ferro-Grumley Award.

== Biography ==
Bledsoe was born and raised in a large family in Portland, Oregon. Bledsoe has stated in interview that she started writing stories when she was young and had always wanted to become a writer. She was inspired to write professionally by her high school Language Arts teacher, and has cited among her influences James Baldwin, Willa Cather, Adrienne Rich, and Barbara Kingsolver.

Bledsoe's interest in Antarctica and wilderness survival began when Bledsoe was three years old, with a family visit to Oregon's Mount Jefferson. She later wrote about this formative experience in her 2006 memoir: The Ice Cave: A Woman's Adventures from the Mojave to the Antarctic.

Bledsoe began her activism in high school, campaigning for the Portland Public Schools to comply with Title IX. From 1975 to 1977, Bledsoe attended Williams College. She earned a B.A. at the University of California at Berkeley in 1979.

Bledsoe has written science curriculum for National Geographic and several other educational organizations, including the George Lucas Educational Foundation and the SETI Institute. From 1997 to 2003, she taught creative writing in the Masters of Creative Writing Graduate Program at the University of San Francisco.

Bledsoe has traveled to Antarctica three times; twice as a two-time recipient of the National Science Foundation's Artists & Writers in Antarctica Fellowship and once as a guest on the Russian ship, the Akademik Sergey Vavilov. She is one of a handful of people who have stayed at all three American stations in Antarctica. As a social justice activist, she has most recently been working on voting rights.

== Career and honors ==
In 1985, she received the PEN Syndicated Fiction Award. In 1995, Bledsoe published Sweat: Stories and a Novella, which helped her garner her first Lambda Literary Award finalist title. In 1997, she wrote her first adult novel Working Parts, for which she received the 1998 Stonewall Book Award - the American Library Association Gay/Lesbian/Bisexual Award for Literature. In 2002, Bledsoe was awarded a California Arts Council fellowship in literature.

Bledsoe's 2002 children's book Hoop Girlz, about a ten-year-old girl who loves playing basketball but doesn't make the school team, was selected as one of Booklist's Top 10 Sports Books for Youth of the year and featured among Core Collection: Sports Fiction for Girls.

Bledsoe has written four books about Antarctica: The Big Bang Symphony; The Ice Cave: A Woman's Adventures from the Mojave to the Antarctic; How to Survive in Antarctica; and The Antarctic Scoop.

Bledsoe's autobiographical young adult novel No Stopping Us Now, which is about love, basketball, and activism, was published in April 2022.

Bledsoe's books and stories have been translated into Japanese, Chinese, Spanish, German, and Dutch. She has been given two National Science Foundation artist and writers in Antarctica fellowships.

== Bibliography ==
Books for adults
- Sweat: Stories and a Novella, 1995.
- Working Parts (novel), 1997.
- This Wild Silence (novel), 2003.
- The Ice Cave: A Woman's Adventures from the Mojave to the Antarctic (nonfiction), 2006.
- Biting the Apple (novel), 2007.
- The Big Bang Symphony (novel), 2010.
- A Thin Bright Line (novel), 2016.
- The Evolution of Love (novel), 2018.
- Lava Falls: Stories, 2018.
- Tell the Rest (novel), 2023.
Books for children
- The Big Bike Race, 1995.
- Tracks in the Snow, 1997.
- Cougar Canyon, 2001.
- Hoop Girlz, 2002.
- The Antarctic Scoop, 2003.
- How to Survive in Antarctica (nonfiction), 2005.
- Running Wild, 2019.
- No Stopping Us Now (young adult novel), 2022.
