= Black Girl in Paris =

2000 novel written by Shay Youngblood

- Author: Shay Youngblood
- Publication date: 2000
- ISBN: 1-57322-151-1

Black Girl in Paris is a novel written by American author Shay Youngblood, originally published in 2000 by Riverhead Books, then reprinted in 2013 by Blue Cloud Press.

The novel follows Eden Daniels, a black American woman in her mid-20s, who longs to be a writer and escapes to Paris in the mid-1980s.

In 2013 the novel was adapted into a short film of the same name directed by Kiandra Parks and starring Zaraah Abrahams.

== Plot summary ==
In 1986 Eden Daniels, a 26 year old African-American woman decides to move to Paris to follow in the steps of other artists she's admired and try to become a writer.

Eden's inspiration for leaving for Paris came from her Aunt Vic. At a young age, Aunt Vic explained to Eden that Paris was a city where people were free to live wherever they desired, work wherever they were qualified, and love whomever they desired. She mentions that her aunt used to tell her stories that sounded like fantasies.

Eden arrives in Paris when a wave of terrorism sparks an anti-immigrant backlash. Nevertheless, she is able to find work in the ex-pat community and works as an artist's model, an au-pair and a poet's assistant. As she scrapes by Eden dreams of encountering one of her literary heroes, James Baldwin who still lives in Paris and who many of her employers have had brief encounters with.

Eden falls in love with Ving, a white American jazz musician, but their relationship is complicated as they still face prejudice for being an interracial couple. When the family where Eden works as an au-pair leaves for the U.S. and Ving leaves around the same time to visit his ailing mother, Eden is left friendless and penniless. She befriends Luce, a Haitian born woman living in Paris who teaches Eden how to steal in order to survive.

Luce leaves Paris and Ving returns, sending Eden to his friends near Saint-Paul-de-Vence, where James Baldwin has an estate. Eden tries to meet him but learns he has returned to Paris. Heartbroken she finally begins to write her story down.

On Eden's last day in Paris she runs into Baldwin leaving a café. He greets her briefly before leaving.

== Importance of Paris ==
As an independent woman Eden makes the crucial decision of leaving her home and family behind to Paris. In "Shay Youngblood's Escape from "the last plantation"" Jones emphasizes how Eden’s reasoning for going to Paris was not primarily to escape racial discrimination and oppression as many well known male writers did such as Baldwin, Du Bois, Hughes, and Wright. Eden saw the opportunity of leaving for Paris as a greater step towards her writing career.

== Historical background ==
Throughout the novel there are various mentions of bombings that happen throughout Eden's journey in Paris. One of the first pages of the novel describe how within Eden's first couple of days in Paris, there were four separate explosions that killed three people and wounded 170. From 1985-1986 a series of terrorist attacks took place in Paris, France that were carried out by the Committee for Solidarity With Arab and Middle Eastern Political Prisoners. In September 1986, the French government decided to send officials to Syria that ultimately concluded a deal with the government that would support for terrorism in France to end. After the attacks in 1986, France will be free of terrorism for the eight years that follow.

== Characters ==
Eden: The story's protagonist who is a black woman that has moved from Georgia to Paris to pursue her dream of writing. She lives in various different places throughout her time in Paris and meets many new people along the way. Her ultimate dream is to meet her favorite author James Baldwin who has inspired her throughout her life.

Ving: An American jazz musician who lives in a cheap apartment. He develops a close relationship with Eden and has anecdotal information about Baldwin. Ving opens up to Eden about his traumatic past allowing them to connect on a deeper level throughout the novel.

Luce: One of the many women Eden meets in Paris. Luce was born in Barbados whose father was a lab technician and mother was a French nurse. Luce and Eden become really close friends throughout the course of the novel and Luce teaches Eden to always take what is needed to get by until all possibilities were exhausted.

Indego: A man who becomes a guide and teacher to Eden throughout her Paris journey. Indego takes Eden on guides throughout Paris in unfamiliar alley ways, shortcuts, bakeries, and bookstores in the city. Indego allows Eden to stay in his apartment for a while as she begins to settle into the area.

Delphine: One of Eden's very first friends when she arrives in Paris. Delphine introduces Eden to many of her friends and helps Eden improve her French.

== Critical reception ==
The novel had a mixed reception. Salon called Youngblood a lyricist but criticized her for "clichéd bohemian characters". In addition, Gaiutra Bahadur states that the novel is at its best when it emphasizes the contradictions Eden faces in Paris and how these contradictions are also at the center of the plot of the novel. Publishers Weekly called it "a bold if sometimes self-indulgent memoir-style account of an aspiring writer".

== Film adaptation ==
Kiandra Parks decided that after reading the novel Black Girl in Paris, she would want to make a film based on it. In 2009, Parks applied to Tisch School of the Arts at New York University and was accepted to the program as a student. Here she was able to obtain all the necessary support and guidance in resting her film. As a result of the film's success, Black Girl in Paris was selected as one of the first entries at the annual American Black Film Festival, and HBO acquired the rights to the film for a year after it was released.

Black Girls in Paris inspired a critically acclaimed song composed by Jay-Z and controversial artist and personality, Kanye West, Ni**as in Paris. This overnight success launched the popularity of the novel, commonly known as and the New Negro Movement
