= (Mary) Terri De la Peña =

Mexican American writer of novels, short stories and essays

(Mary) Terri de la Peña (born February 20, 1947) is a Mexican American writer of novels, short stories and essays. Her works have addressed lesbian sexuality, nature, and Chicana community. De la Peña was 45 years old when her first book Margins was published.

== Early life ==
De la Peña was born on February 20, 1947, in Santa Monica, California. She is a fifth-generation Californian. Her father, Joaquin de la Peña, was descended from the Marquez family, one of the earliest families to settle in the area following the land grants parceled out in the early nineteenth century, and worked as a tire repair foreman. Her mother, Juanita Escobedo, ran a beauty shop from home; her mother and maternal grandmother immigrated from Chihuahua, Mexico, in the 1920s.

De la Peña grew up working class in a Mexican American Catholic family and attended St. Anne's Catholic School, where the nuns encouraged her to pursue higher education. Her parents, however, pushed her to learn trade skills so she could work and start a family as soon as possible.

From an early age, de la Peña was aware that she was attracted to girls and that this would not be acceptable in her cultural environment. With no concept of lesbianism available to her and no role models, she turned to Westerns as a form of escapism and began exploring queer storylines about Mexican Americans living in the rural American West. At the age of 24, she survived a traumatic hit-and-run accident, an experience that led her to incorporate car crashes as a recurring motif in her writing.

== Career ==
After high school, de la Peña attended Los Angeles Trade Technical College to study commercial art, then moved between positions at the UCLA Chicano Studies Research Center, the UCLA Chemistry Department, various law firms, and later administrative roles at UCLA, where she eventually worked as an academic affairs assistant with the College of Letters and Science. A self-taught writer, she wrote her first novel while employed at UCLA.

During this period she began joining feminist and lesbian circles in Los Angeles through the Sisterhood Bookstore and became involved with a Latina Writers' Group. She submitted her short story "A Saturday Night in August"—about a closeted Chicana who attends an Equal Rights Amendment rally and encounters an openly lesbian woman—to the Chicano Literary Prize, where it received third place.

In 1992, de la Peña published her first novel, Margins, which has been described as the first Chicana lesbian coming-out novel. The novel follows Veronica Melendez, a 22-year-old Chicana graduate student in English at UCLA, who survives a car accident that kills her longtime friend and lover. While recovering, she becomes involved with two women: a white Italian neighbor and a Chicana film student, and ultimately must confront the rejection of her parents and the Catholic Church over her sexuality. Publishers Weekly praised the novel for its portrayal of the loneliness and isolation of a closeted lesbian within a close-knit Chicano family. De la Peña intended the protagonist to come out at a young age and serve as a role model for Latina readers. The publication also marked de la Peña's own public coming out, as colleagues at UCLA recognized the autobiographical elements of the story; she subsequently began visiting university classes to give readings and talks.

Her second novel, Latin Satins (1994), follows the adventures of a singing group living in a group house in Ocean Park. She drafted the novel during a 1993 writing residency at Hedgebrook on Whidbey Island, Washington. Her third novel, Faults (1999), centers on the 1994 Northridge earthquake and was nominated for the Lambda Literary Award for Lesbian Fiction. She also published the short story "Beyond El Camino Real," which draws on a cross-country road trip with a former girlfriend and reflects on racial segregation encountered in rural America.

De la Peña contributed short fiction to numerous anthologies beginning in 1989, including Finding Courage: Writings by Women, Blood Whispers: L.A. Writers on AIDS, Lavender Mansions, and Night Bites: Vampire Stories by Women, among others. She retired from UCLA in June 2013.

De la Peña has stated that her identity as a published lesbian Chicana writer empowers her by bringing together the otherwise fragmented parts of her identity, and she has expressed hope that her works can serve as role models for Mexican Americans navigating their queer identities.

== Selected works ==
=== Novels ===
- Margins, Seal Press, 1992
- Latin Satins, Seal Press, 1994
- Faults, Alyson Books, 1999

=== Children's books ===
- A is for the Americas, co-written with Cynthia Chin-Lee and Enrique O. Sanchez, Orchard Books, 1999

=== Selected anthology contributions ===
- Finding Courage: Writings by Women, 1989
- The Original Coming Out Stories, 1989
- Lesbian Bedtime Stories Two, 1990
- Blood Whispers: L.A. Writers on AIDS, 1991
- Happy Endings: Lesbian Writers Talk about Their Lives and Work, 1993
- Lavender Mansions: 40 Contemporary Lesbian and Gay Short Stories, 1994
- Another Wilderness: New Outdoor Writing by Women, 1994
- Night Bites: Vampire Stories by Women, 1996
- At Home on This Earth: Two Centuries of U.S. Women's Nature Writing, 2002
- Tortilleras: Hispanic and U.S. Latina Lesbian Expression, 2003
