= The Gifts of the Body =

1994 novel by Rebecca Brown

- First edition
- Author: Rebecca Brown
- Language: English
- Subject: AIDS/caregivers
- Genre: Short story cycle
- Publisher: HarperCollins
- Publication date: 1994
- Publication place: United States
- ISBN: 0-06-017159-6

The Gifts of the Body is a 1994 novel by Rebecca Brown, and originally published by HarperCollins. The book consists of several interconnected stories.

== Plot ==
The several short stories are narrated by a caregiver who is tending to several patients who have contracted AIDS. Each story could be considered by itself, or the combined narrative could be viewed as one panorama dealing with either the AIDS or with those who care for those afflicted with the virus. Each story is an illness narrative in itself, as it describes the physical and emotional trauma experienced by both the patients and the caregiver.

== Plot summary ==
The book contains ten short stories, the titles of each being associated with "gifts" which are various functions of the body, both physical and emotional: sweat, wholeness, tears, skin, hunger, mobility, death, speech, sight, hope, and mourning. The caregiver experiences each "gift", as he/she deals with patients who have AIDS, showing the different shared relationships in each case. Each patient is a distinct case, differing in terms of age, financial situation, attitude toward the illness etc., showing the reader that this disease affects all types of people.

== Style ==
The book is written in the "no-frills style" that characterizes Brown's oeuvre as a whole. Brown's minimalist style is typified by short words, sentences and paragraphs; a minimalist vocabulary and a syntax using repetition or coordinated sentences rather than complex subordinated phrases; and a non-emotive tone.

== Characters ==
=== The Caregiver ===
The gender of the caregiver is unknown, although it is hinted that it is a young adult who is still working on post-high-school education. The caregiver works for Urban Community Services (UCS), an organization that seems to be geared towards patients with AIDS. As the caregiver interacts with the patients, the reader witnesses their growing relationships. The caregiver is straightforward, almost blunt, in narrating the story, clearly illuminating the resulting emotions.

The book shows that the care between the narrator and her clients is mutual. For instance, the latter comfort the narrator when she learns that one of her close colleagues has been diagnosed with AIDS. Yet the book refuses to idealize the practice of caring. After all, readers see the narrator put herself aside for the people she cares for (calling and visiting clients during her time off from work), and watch her suffer from her strong emotional connection with them. "After a while, this intense involvement becomes untenable for the narrator, who starts to protect herself by creating some distance between her and the people she cares for (and whom she has to let go because they all ultimately die)."

=== Rick ===
Rick is the AIDS patient of the first story. He shares a routine with the caregiver, who visits every Tuesday and Thursday, bringing coffee and cinnamon rolls to share. After Rick would answer the door, always with a "Hello! Just a minute!", the two would talk before the caregiver would clean the house. When the caregiver arrives one day and finds Rick curled up on the couch, not really responding, it is obvious that there is something wrong. He is shaking, saying he is cold, although his body is hot and bathed in sweat. The caregiver holds him until he can be taken to the hospital.

=== Mrs. Connie Lindstrom ===
Mrs Lindstrom is an old woman which whom the caregiver comes to care for deeply. Aside from the caregiver, Mrs Lindstrom is the most recurring character because of this relationship. She tries to be independent in taking care of herself, despite her illness, as seen in The Gift of Wholeness when she insists upon making the refreshments despite being totally out of breath throughout the whole process. She shares a close relationship with her three children, especially her son Joe. In The Gift of Mourning, it is Joe and the caregiver who are constantly at her side in her last moments.

=== Ed ===
Ed is an older man, whom the caregiver has tended to for some time at the beginning of the story. Ed has been accepted for a room at a local hospice after being on the waiting list for a long time, but when the time comes, he is unsure if he wants to accept it. In The Gift of Tears, he ends up not accepting the room, claiming that he has too much to do before he can move out. However, we find that he ends up in the hospice in The Gift of Mobility where he is respected and known as the man who turned down a room. When the caregiver comes to visit him, he seems to be adjusting well, but as the visits progress, the caregiver learns that Ed can't stand living in the hospice. He ends up leaving the hospice to go to the YMCA, but ends up leaving the Y on the same day, leading the caregiver to not know of his whereabouts. When the caregiver asks his friends at the hospice how he seemed when he left, they simply laugh and say "vertical".

=== Carlos ===
Carlos is middle aged and of Hispanic descent. The caregiver's interaction with this patient is minimal until bathtime. In the process of getting Carlos undressed, the condom part of his catheter is exposed, much to his embarrassment, but the caregiver remains casual and calm for his sake. The bath calms Carlos; the cleansing of his skin acting as a soothing ritual.

=== Marty ===
Marty is a young adult whom the caregiver meets while visiting Carlos, as the two had long been close friends. After Carlos' death, the caregiver again encounters Marty but fails to recognize him, his appearance having changed drastically from essentially fat to drastically thin. The two discuss Carlos, and it is revealed that Marty played a part in his friend's death because he hated to see him suffer through the pain, telling the caregiver that he "gave him the gift of death."

=== Mike ===
Mike is not on the caregiver's usual visitation list, but one day Mike's usual caregiver, Roger, is unavailable and our narrator fills in. Throughout the visit, Mike is constantly comparing what the caregiver does to what Roger does, revealing the close nature of his relationship with Roger. This leads the caregiver to tell Mike that he is very important to Roger, an act that the caregiver feels makes all the difference with Mike.

=== Keith ===
Keith is the most-repellent-appearing case, according to the caregiver, who describes the process of placing salve on Keith's body sores as an ordeal that must be done calmly and without hesitation, in order to avoid embarrassing the patient. One day, as the caregiver is rubbing the salve in, Keith tells the story behind a painting in the room, which was painted in Africa. Keith says that he lived in Africa for some time, which his mother thought was a good thing, until he contracted AIDS and had to return to the States. He and another patient (Connie) are the only patients with whom the caregiver is actually present at the time of their deaths.

=== Margaret ===
Margaret is a long-time UCS supervisor, who shares many experiences with the caregiver during the years. However, Margaret has contracted AIDS herself, and has had to leave her position with the company. This causes an emotional response from everyone in the organization. When the caregiver asks Margaret if she desires anything, she replies, "You can hope again."

== Reception ==
This novel received a mixed reception. Marilyn McEntyre described it as an informative read about caregiving due to the appreciation and respect shown for the process of giving and receiving care. Jennifer Blair says that there is a theme of shame in these stories that is so strong it creates an absence of the hope and expectation of success, and that it establishes its own ethic about caregiving and how it must "never inspire a measurable, retributive, or moralistic response."

=== Awards ===
The Gifts of the Body won the Lambda Literary Award.
