= Happiness, Like Water =

2013 collection of by Chinelo Okparanta

- First edition
- Author: Chinelo Okparanta
- Language: English
- Genre: Literary Fiction
- Set in: Nigeria
- Publisher: Mariner Books, Houghton Mifflin Harcourt
- Publication date: 13 August 2013
- Publication place: Nigeria
- Media type: Print (paperback)
- Pages: 208 pp (first edition)
- ISBN: 978-0-544-00345-3 (first edition)
- OCLC: 857069665

Happiness, Like Water is a 2013 collection of short stories written by Nigeria writer Chinelo Okparanta. It was first published on 13 August 2013, by Mariner Books, an imprint of HarperCollins publishers.

== Plot summary ==
The anthology has a total collection of seven stories; each having a different but unique message to deliver. These messages include the life of Nigerians towards the "Yahoo Boys", the life of homosexuals in Nigeria and the image of Nigeria in the diaspora.

== Contents ==
- "On Ohaeto Street"
- "Wahala"
- "Fairness"
- "Runs Girl"
- "America"
- "Shelter"
- "Tumours and Butterflies"
