= Terminal Velocity (Boyd novel) =

1997 novel by Blanche McCrary Boyd

- Author: Blanche McCrary Boyd
- Language: English
- Publication date: 1997

Terminal Velocity is a 1997 lesbian-feminist novel by American writer Blanche McCrary Boyd. It takes place in 1970s California in the context of political upheaval, sexual revolution, and radical counter-culture. It also deals with themes of drug use and alcoholism.

It is the second book in the Blacklock trilogy that follows protagonist Ellen Burns. The first book in the trilogy, the 1991 novel The Revolution of Little Girls, won a Ferro-Grumley Award. The final book of the trilogy is the 2018 novel Tomb of the Unknown Racist.
