= 20th Lambda Literary Awards =

2008 literary awards ceremony

The 20th Lambda Literary Awards were held in 2008, to honour works of LGBT literature published in 2007.

== Special awards ==
Category	Winner
Pioneer Award	Malcolm Boyd, Mark Thompson

== Nominees and winners ==
Category	Winner	Nominated
Bisexual Literature	Brent Hartinger, Split Screen	Jennifer Baumgardner, Look Both Ways; Beth Firestein, Becoming Visible; Jeff Hobbs, The Tourists; Sheri Joseph, Stray
Gay Debut Fiction	Christopher Kelly, A Push and a Shove	James Canon, Tales from the Town of Widows; Michael Quadland, That Was Then; Kemble Scott, SoMa; James St. James, Freak Show
Gay Fiction	André Aciman, Call Me By Your Name	Andrew W. M. Beierle, First Person Plural; Samuel R. Delany, Dark Reflections; Thomas Mallon, Fellow Travelers; Manuel Muñoz, The Faith Healer of Olive Avenue
Gay Memoir/Biography	Kevin Sessums, Mississippi Sissy	Thom Bierdz, Forgiving Troy; Mark Doty, Dog Years; Martin Duberman, The Worlds of Lincoln Kirstein; Kenny Fries, The History of My Shoes and the Evolution of Darwin’s Theory; Aaron Raz Link and Hilda Raz, What Becomes You
Gay Mystery	Greg Herren, Murder in the Rue Chartres	Chris Beakey, Double Abduction; Anthony Bidulka, Stain of the Berry; Roberto Ferrari, Pierce; Neil Plakcy, Mahu Surfer; Caro Soles, Drag Queen in the Court of Death
Gay Romance	Michael Thomas Ford, Changing Tides	Robin Reardon, A Secret Edge; Frederick Smith, Right Side of the Wrong Bed; Seth Rudetsky, Broadway Nights; Robert Taylor, A Few Hints and Clews
Lesbian Debut Fiction	Aoibheann Sweeney, Among Other Things, I've Taken Up Smoking	Holly Farris, Lockjaw; Myriam Gurba, Dahlia Season; Lu Vickers, Breathing Underwater; Corrina Wycoff, O Street
Lesbian Fiction	Ali Liebegott, The IHOP Papers	Lucy Jane Bledsoe, Biting the Apple; Mari SanGiovanni, Greetings from Jamaica; Sarah Schulman, The Child; Julia Watts, The Kind of Girl I Am; Jess Wells, The Mandrake Broom
Lesbian Memoir/Biography	Nicola Griffith, And Now We Are Going to Have a Party	Marusya Bocurkiuw, Comfort Food for Breakups; Amy Hoffman, An Army of Ex-Lovers; Janet Malcolm, Two Lives: Gertrude & Alice; Jacqueline Taylor, Waiting for the Call
Lesbian Mystery	Gabrielle Goldsby, Wall of Silence	Ellen Hart, Mortal Groove; Gerri Hill, In the Name of the Father; Jennifer L. Jordan, Selective Memory; Ursula Steck, Laura’s War
Lesbian Romance	KG MacGregor, Out of Love	Gun Brooke, Sheridan’s Fate; Frankie J. Jones, The Road Home; Marianne K. Martin, For Now, for Always; Radclyffe, When Dreams Tremble
LGBT Anthology	Richard Labonté and Lawrence Schimel, First Person Queer	Jennifer Camper, Juicy Mother 2; Richard Canning, Vital Signs; Sean Meriwether and Greg Wharton, Men of Mystery: Homoerotic Tales of Intrigue and Suspense; Michelle Tea, Baby Remember My Name
LGBT Children's/Young Adult	Perry Moore, Hero	Peter Cameron, Someday This Pain Will Be Useful to You; P. E. Ryan, Saints of Augustine; James St. James, Freak Show; Ellen Wittlinger, Parrotfish
LGBT Drama	Steve Susoyev and George Birimisa, eds., Return to the Caffe Cino	Dan Bernitt, Dose: Plays & Monologues; Victor Bumbalo, Niagara Falls
LGBT Erotica	Simon Sheppard, Homosex: 60 Years of Gay Erotica	Victoria Brownworth and Judith M. Redding, The Golden Age of Lesbian Erotica; J. D. Glass, Red Light; William Maltese and Wayne Gunn, Ardennian Boy; Lawrence Schimel, The Mammoth Book of New Gay Erotica; Fiona Zedde, Every Dark Desire
LGBT Non-Fiction	Michael S. Sherry, Gay Artists in Modern American Culture	Sharon Marcus, Between Women; Toni Mirosevich, Pink Harvest; Michael Rowe, Other Men’s Sons; David Valentine, Imagining Transgender
LGBT Poetry	Henri Cole, Blackbird and Wolf	Dawn Lundy Martin, A Gathering of Matter/A Matter of Gathering; Carol Potter, Otherwise Obedient; Reginald Shepherd, Fata Morgana; C. Dale Young, The Second Person; Rachel Zolf, Human Resources
LGBT Science Fiction/Fantasy/Horror	Lee Thomas, The Dust of Wonderland	Ginn Hale, Wicked Gentlemen; Sarah Monette and Elizabeth Bear, A Companion to Wolves; Brian Francis Slattery, Spaceman Blues: A Love Song; Jo Walton, Ha'penny
LGBT Studies	Sharon Marcus, Between Women	Bertram Cohler, Writing Desire; Pagan Kennedy, The First Man-Made Man; Mark Padilla, Caribbean Pleasure Industry; Robert Reid-Pharr, Once You Go Black: Choice, Desire, & the Black American Intellectual
Transgender Literature	Cris Beam, ed., Transparent	LeeRay M. Costa, Male Bodies, Women’s Souls; Eli Clare, The Marrow’s Telling; Aaron Raz Link and Hilda Raz, What Becomes You; Matt Bernstein Sycamore, Nobody Passes
Arts & Culture	Matthew Hays, The View from Here: Conversations with Gay and Lesbian Filmmakers	Kevin Barnhurst, Media Queered; Kittredge Cherry, Art That Dares; Heather Love, Feeling Backward; Michael Rowe, Other Men’s Sons
