= Ferro-Grumley Award =

LGBT literary award

- Awarded for: LGBTQ+ fiction
- Sponsored by: Publishing Triangle
- Reward: US$1,000
- Established: 1990

The Ferro-Grumley Award is an annual literary award, presented by Publishing Triangle and the Ferro-Grumley Foundation to a book deemed the year's best work of LGBTQ fiction. The award is presented in memory of writers Robert Ferro and Michael Grumley. It was co-founded in 1988 by Stephen Greco, who continues to direct it as of 2022.

First awarded in 1990, separate awards were presented for gay and lesbian fiction until 2008 when the awards were merged into a single award.

On two occasions, the award has been won by works that were not conventional literary fiction. In 1994, journalist John Berendt won the award for his non-fiction novel Midnight in the Garden of Good and Evil, and in 2009, cartoonist Alison Bechdel won the award for her comic strip anthology The Essential Dykes to Watch Out For.

== Awards ==
=== Ferro-Grumley Award for Literary Excellence (1990–1996) ===
Award winners
| Year | Category | Author | TItle | Result | Ref. |
|---|---|---|---|---|---|
| 1990 | Men | Dennis Cooper | Closer | Winner | |
| 1990 | Women | Ruthann Robson | Eye of the Hurricane | Winner | |
| 1991 | Men | Allen Barnett | The Body and Its Dangers | Winner | |
| 1991 | Women | Cherry Muhanji | Her | Winner | |
| 1992 | Men | Melvin Dixon | Vanishing Rooms | Winner | |
| 1992 | Women | Blanche McCrary Boyd | The Revolution of Little Girls | Winner | |
| 1993 | Men | Randall Kenan | Let the Dead Bury Their Dead | Winner | |
| 1993 | Women | Dorothy Allison | Bastard Out of Carolina | Winner | |
| 1994 | Men | John Berendt | Midnight in the Garden of Good and Evil (Note: Presented a special award for distinguished nonfiction) | Winner | |
| 1994 | Women | Jeanette Winterson | Written on the Body | Winner | |
| 1995 | Men | Mark Merlis | American Studies | Winner | |
| 1995 | Women | Heather Lewis | House Rules | Winner | |
| 1996 | Men | Felice Picano | Like People in History | Winner | |
| 1996 | Women | Sarah Schulman | Rat Bohemia | Winner | |

=== Ferro-Grumley Award for Gay Fiction (1997–2007) ===
Award winners and finalists
| Year | Author | TItle | Publisher | Result | scope="col" width="5%" | Ref. |
|---|---|---|---|---|---|---|
| 1997 | Andrew Holleran | The Beauty of Men | | Winner | | |
| 1997 | J. S. Marcus | The Captain's Fire | | Finalist | | |
| 1997 | Michael Nava | The Death of Friends | | Finalist | | |
| 1998 | Colm Tóibín | The Story of the Night | | Winner | | |
| 1998 | Edmund White | The Farewell Symphony | | Finalist | | |
| 1998 | Richard House | Bruiser | | Finalist | | |
| 1999 | Michael Cunningham | The Hours | | Winner | | |
| 1999 | Keith Ridgway | The Long Falling | | Finalist | | |
| 1999 | Michael Lowenthal | The Same Embrace | | Finalist | | |
| 2000 | Paul Russell | The Coming Storm | St. Martin's Press | Winner | | |
| 2000 | Matthew Stadler | Allan Stein | Grove | Finalist | | |
| 2000 | Michael Downing | Breakfast with Scot | Counterpoint | Finalist | | |
| 2001 | Edmund White | The Married Man | Alfred A. Knopf | Winner | | |
| 2001 | Bernard Cooper | Guess Again: Stories | Simon and Schuster | Finalist | | |
| 2001 | David Leavitt | Martin Bauman; Or, A Sure Thing | Houghton Mifflin | Finalist | | |
| 2002 | David Ebershoff | The Rose City | Viking Press | Winner | | |
| 2002 | Alexander Chee | Edinburgh | Welcome Rain Publishers | Finalist | | |
| 2002 | JT LeRoy | The Heart Is Deceitful Above All Things | Bloomsbury | Finalist | | |
| 2003 | Jamie O'Neill | At Swim, Two Boys | Scribner | Winner | | |
| 2003 | Brian Malloy | The Year of Ice | St. Martin's Press | Finalist | | |
| 2003 | Michael Lowenthal | Avoidance | Graywolf Press | Finalist | | |
| 2004 | Trebor Healey | Through It Came Bright Colors | Harrington Park Press | Winner | | |
| 2004 | Christopher Bram | Lives of the Circus Animals | William Morrow | Finalist | | |
| 2004 | John Rowell | The Music of Your Life | Simon and Schuster | Finalist | | |
| 2005 | Adam Berlin | Belmondo Style | St. Martin's Press | Winner | | |
| 2005 | Colm Tóibín | The Master | Scribner | Finalist | | |
| 2005 | Jim Tushinski | Van Allen's Ecstasy | Southern Tier Editions | Finalist | | |
| 2006 | Barry McCrea | The First Verse | Carroll & Graf | Winner | | |
| 2006 | Darren Greer | Still Life with June | St. Martin's Press | Finalist | | |
| 2006 | Douglas A. Martin | Branwell | Soft Skull Press | Finalist | | |
| 2007 | Christopher Bram | Exiles in America | William Morrow | Winner | | |
| 2007 | Martin Hyatt | A Scarecrow's Bible | Suspect Thoughts Press | Finalist | | |
| 2007 | Stephen McCauley | Alternatives to Sex | Simon and Schuster | Finalist | | |

=== Ferro-Grumley Award for Lesbian Fiction (1997–2007) ===
Award winners and finalists
| Year | Author | TItle | Publisher | Result | scope="col" width="5%" | Ref. |
|---|---|---|---|---|---|---|
| 1997 | Persimmon Blackbridge | Sunnybrook | | Winner | | |
| 1997 | Jenifer Levin | Love and Death and Other Stories | | Finalist | | |
| 1997 | Margaret Erhart | Old Love | | Finalist | | |
| 1998 | Elana Dykewomon | Beyond the Pale | | Winner | | |
| 1998 | Ann-Marie MacDonald | Fall on Your Knees | | Finalist | | |
| 1998 | Shay Youngblood | Soul Kiss | | Finalist | | |
| 1999 | Patricia Powell | The Pagoda | | Winner | | |
| 1999 | Ali Smith | Like | | Finalist | | |
| 1999 | Jewelle Gomez | Don't Explain | | Finalist | | |
| 2000 | Judy Doenges | What She Left Me | Middlebury Press | Winner | | |
| 2000 | Elizabeth Stark | Shy Girl | Farrar, Straus and Giroux | Finalist | | |
| 2000 | Sarah Waters | Tipping the Velvet | Riverhead | Finalist | | |
| 2001 | Sarah Waters | Affinity | Riverhead | Winner | | |
| 2001 | Eileen Myles | Cool for You | Soft Skull Press | Finalist | | |
| 2001 | Jane Summer | The Silk Road | Alyson Books | Finalist | | |
| 2002 | Emma Donoghue | Slammerkin | Harcourt | Winner | | |
| 2002 | Achy Obejas | Days of Awe | Ballantine | Finalist | | |
| 2002 | Ann Wadsworth | Light Coming Back | Alyson Books | Finalist | | |
| 2003 | Carol Anshaw | Lucky in the Corner | Houghton Mifflin | Winner | | |
| 2003 | Jane Eaton Hamilton | Hunger | Oberon Press | Finalist | | |
| 2003 | Zoé Valdés | Dear First Love | HarperCollins | Finalist | | |
| 2004 | Nina Revoyr | Southland | Akashic Books | Winner | | |
| 2004 | Alison Bechdel | Dykes & Sundry Other Carbon-Based Life-Forms to Watch Out For | Alyson Books | Finalist | | |
| 2004 | Rebecca Brown | The End of Youth | City Lights | Finalist | | |
| 2005 | Stacey D'Erasmo | A Seahorse Year | Houghton Mifflin | Winner | | |
| 2005 | Emma Donoghue | Life Mask | Harcourt | Finalist | | |
| 2005 | Heather Lewis | Notice | Serpent's Tail | Finalist | | |
| 2006 | Patricia Grossman | Brian in Three Seasons | Permanent Press | Winner | | |
| 2006 | Brenda Brooks | Gotta Find Me an Angel | Raincoast Books | Finalist | | |
| 2006 | Ivan E. Coyote | Loose End | Arsenal Pulp Press | Finalist | | |
| 2007 | Lisa Carey | Every Visible Thing | William Morrow | Winner | | |
| 2007 | Ivan E. Coyote | Bow Grip | Arsenal Pulp Press | Finalist | | |
| 2007 | Rebecca Brown | The Last Time I Saw You | City Lights | Finalist | | |

=== Ferro Grumley Award for LGBTQ Fiction (2008–present) ===
Award winners and finalists
| Year | Author | TItle | Publisher | Result | Ref. |
|---|---|---|---|---|---|
| 2008 (Note: In 2008, seven authors competed for two prizes under a single category.) | Peter Cameron | Someday This Pain Will Be Useful to You | Frances Foster Books | Winner | |
| 2008 | Ali Liebegott | The IHOP Papers | Carroll & Graf | Winner | |
| 2008 | Brian Malloy | Brendan Wolf | | Finalist | |
| 2008 | André Aciman | Call Me by Your Name | Farrar, Straus and Giroux | Finalist | |
| 2008 | Sarah Schulman | The Child | Carroll & Graf | Finalist | |
| 2008 | Felicia Luna Lemus | Like Son | Akashic Books | Finalist | |
| 2008 | Armistead Maupin | Michael Tolliver Lives | HarperCollins | Finalist | |
| 2009 (Note: Starting in 2009, 5-6 finalists competed for a single award.) | Alison Bechdel | The Essential Dykes to Watch Out For | Houghton Mifflin Harcourt | Winner | |
| 2009 | Andrew Sean Greer | The Story of a Marriage | Farrar, Straus and Giroux | Finalist | |
| 2009 | Benjamin Taylor | The Book of Getting Even | Steerforth | Finalist | |
| 2009 | Blair Mastbaum | Us Ones in Between | Running Press | Finalist | |
| 2009 | David Ebershoff | The 19th Wife | Random House | Finalist | |
| 2009 | Ellen Wittlinger | Love and Lies | Simon and Schuster Books for Young Readers | Finalist | |
| 2010 | Sebastian Stuart | The Hour Between | Alyson Books | Winner | |
| 2010 | Barb Johnson | More of This World or Maybe Another | HarperPerennial | Finalist | |
| 2010 | Eleanor Lerman | The Blonde on the Train | Mayapple Press | Finalist | |
| 2010 | G. Winston James | Shaming the Devil | Top Pen Press | Finalist | |
| 2010 | Jill Malone | A Field Guide to Deception | Bywater Books | Finalist | |
| 2010 | Vestal McIntyre | Lake Overturn | Harper | Finalist | |
| 2011 | Michael Sledge | The More I Owe You | Counterpoint Press | Winner | |
| 2011 | Daniel Allen Cox | Krakow Melt | Arsenal Pulp Press | Finalist | |
| 2011 | Daniel Black | Perfect Peace | St. Martin's Press | Finalist | |
| 2011 | David McConnell | The Silver Hearted | Alyson Books | Finalist | |
| 2011 | Eileen Myles | Inferno | OR Books | Finalist | |
| 2011 | Lucy Jane Bledsoe | The Big Bang Symphony | University of Wisconsin Press | Finalist | |
| 2012 | Paul Russell | The Unreal Life of Sergey Nabokov | Cleis Press | Winner | |
| 2012 | Alan Hollinghurst | The Stranger's Child | Alfred A. Knopf | Finalist | |
| 2012 | Bob Smith | Remembrance of Things I Forgot | University of Wisconsin Press | Finalist | |
| 2012 | Rahul Mehta | Quarantine | HarperPerennial | Finalist | |
| 2012 | Shannon Cain | The Necessity of Certain Behaviors | University of Pittsburgh Press | Finalist | |
| 2012 | Suzette Mayr | Monoceros | Coach House Press | Finalist | |
| 2013 | Trebor Healey | A Horse Named Sorrow | University of Wisconsin Press | Winner | |
| 2013 | Abdellah Taïa | An Arab Melancholia | Semiotex[e] | Finalist | |
| 2013 | Barry Webster | The Lava in My Bones | Arsenal Pulp Press | Finalist | |
| 2013 | Ellen Ullman | By Blood | Farrar, Straus and Giroux | Finalist | |
| 2013 | Ken Anderson | Sea Change | Starbooks Press | Finalist | |
| 2013 | Perry Brass | King of Angels | Belhue Press | Finalist | |
| 2014 | Sara Farizan | If You Could Be Mine | Algonquin Young Readers | Winner | |
| 2014 | Allan Gurganus | Local Souls | Liveright | Finalist | |
| 2014 | Christopher Castellani | All This Talk of Love | Algonquin Books of Chapel Hill | Finalist | |
| 2014 | David Leavitt | The Two Hotel Francforts | Bloomsbury USA | Finalist | |
| 2014 | Sheri Joseph | Where You Can Find Me | Thomas Dunne Books | Finalist | |
| 2015 | Bernardine Evaristo | Mr. Loverman | Akashic Books | Winner | |
| 2015 | Barry Brennessel | Sideways Down the Sky | MLR Press | Finalist | |
| 2015 | Judith Frank | All I Love and Know | William Morrow | Finalist | |
| 2015 | Raziel Reid | When Everything Feels Like the Movies | Arsenal Pulp Press | Finalist | |
| 2015 | Tom Spanbauer | I Loved You More | Hawthorne Books | Finalist | |
| 2016 | Michael Golding | A Poet of the Invisible World | Picador | Winner | |
| 2016 | Chinelo Okparanta | Under the Udala Trees | Houghton Mifflin Harcourt | Finalist | |
| 2016 | Hanya Yanagihara | A Little Life | Doubleday | Finalist | |
| 2016 | Lori Ostlund | After the Parade | Scribner | Finalist | |
| 2016 | Mark Merlis | JD | Terrace Books | Finalist | |
| 2017 | Cathleen Schine | They May Not Mean To, But They Do | Sarah Crichton Books | Winner | |
| 2017 | Alan Lessik | The Troubleseeker | Chelsea Station Editions | Finalist | |
| 2017 | Darren Greer | Advocate | Cormorant Books | Finalist | |
| 2017 | Lucy Jane Bledsoe | A Thin Bright Line | University of Wisconsin Press | Finalist | |
| 2017 | Sjón, trans. by Victoria Cribb | Moonstone | Farrar, Straus and Giroux | Finalist | |
| 2018 | Alistair McCartney | The Disintegrations | University of Wisconsin Press | Winner | |
| 2018 | Carmen Maria Machado | Her Body and Other Parties | Graywolf Press | Finalist | |
| 2018 | John Boyne | The Heart's Invisible Furies | Hogarth | Finalist | |
| 2018 | Matthew Lansburgh | Outside Is the Ocean | University of Iowa Press | Finalist | |
| 2018 | Paula Martinac | The Ada Decades | Bywater Books | Finalist | |
| 2019 | John R. Gordon | Drapetomania | Team Angelica | Winner | |
| 2019 | Andrea Kleine | Eden | Houghton Mifflin Harcourt | Finalist | |
| 2019 | John Boyne | A Ladder to the Sky | Hogarth | Finalist | |
| 2019 | Lucy Jane Bledsoe | The Evolution of Love | Rare Bird | Finalist | |
| 2019 | Sarah Winman | Tin Man | Putnam | Finalist | |
| 2020 | Ocean Vuong | On Earth We're Briefly Gorgeous | Penguin Press | Winner | |
| 2020 | Bernardine Evaristo | Girl, Woman, Other | Black Cat | Finalist | |
| 2020 | Elizabeth Earley | Like Wings, Your Hands | Red Hen Press | Finalist | |
| 2020 | Jacqueline Woodson | Red at the Bone | Riverhead | Finalist | |
| 2020 | Janice Gould (ed.) | A Generous Spirit: Selected Work by Beth Brant | Sinister Wisdom | Finalist | |
| 2020 | Philippe Besson; trans. by Molly Ringwald | Lie with Me | Scribner | Finalist | |
| 2021 | Julián Delgado Lopera | Fiebre Tropical | Feminist Press | Winner | |
| 2021 | Bishakh Som | Apsara Engine | Feminist Press | Finalist | |
| 2021 | Bryan Washington | Memorial | Riverhead | Finalist | |
| 2021 | Joon Oluchi Lee | Neotenica | Nightboat Books | Finalist | |
| 2021 | Katharina Volckmer | The Appointment | Avid Reader Press | Finalist | |
| 2022 | Anthony Veasna So | Afterparties | Ecco | Winner | |
| 2022 | Buki Papillon | An Ordinary Wonder | Pegasus Books | Finalist | |
| 2022 | Eddy Boudel Tan | The Rebellious Tide | Dundurn Press | Finalist | |
| 2022 | Jeanne Thornton | Summer Fun | Soho Press | Finalist | |
| 2022 | Melissa Broder | Milk Fed | Scribner | Finalist | |
| 2023 | James Hannaham | Didn't Nobody Give a Shit What Happened to Carlotta | Little, Brown & Co. | Winner | |
| 2023 | Chelene Knight | Junie | Book*hug Press | Finalist | |
| 2023 | Marcial Gala, trans. by Anna Kushner | Call Me Cassandra | Farrar Straus Giroux | Finalist | |
| 2023 | Mecca Jamilah Sullivan | Big Girl | Liveright | Finalist | |
| 2023 | Rachel M. Harper | The Other Mother | Counterpoint | Finalist | |
| 2023 | Zain Khalid | Brother Alive | Grove Atlantic | Finalist | |
| 2024 | Helen Elaine Lee | Pomegranate | Atria Books | Winner | |
| 2024 | Nana Kwame Adjei-Brenyah | Chain-Gang All-Stars | Penguin Random House | Finalist | |
| 2024 | Gabrielle Boulianne-Tremblay, trans. by Eli Tareq El Bechelany-Lynch | Dandelion Daughter | Esplanade Books | Finalist | |
| 2024 | Emily Zhou | Girlfriends | LittlePuss Press | Finalist | |
| 2024 | Oksana Vasyakina, trans. by Elina Alter | Wound | Catapult Books | Finalist | |
| 2025 | Jiaming Tang | Cinema Love | Dutton | Winner | |
| 2025 | Anne Fleming | Curiosities | Knopf | Finalist | |
| 2025 | Gary Zebrun | Hart Island | University of Wisconsin Press | Finalist | |
| 2025 | Kazim Ali | Indian Winter | Coach House Books | Finalist | |
| 2025 | Ruben Reyes Jr. | There is a Rio Grande in Heaven | Mariner Books | Finalist | |
| 2026 | Scott Alexander Hess | Drought | Rebel Satori Press | Winner | |
| 2026 | Jeanne Thornton | A/S/L | Soho Press | Finalist | |
| 2026 | Lori Ostlund | Are You Happy?: Stories | Astra House | Finalist | |
| 2026 | Victoria Redel | I Am You | SJP Lit | Finalist | |
| 2026 | Tash Aw | The South | Farrar, Straus and Giroux | Finalist | |
