= Heather Lewis =

Heather Lewis may refer to:

- Heather Lewis (writer) (1962–2002), American writer
- Heather Lewis (musician) (born 1962), multi-instrumentalist and founding member of Beat Happening
- Heather Lewis (racewalker) (born 1993), British racewalker
