= The Coming Storm =

The Coming Storm may refer to:

- The Coming Storm (novel), a 1999 novel by Paul Russell
- The Coming Storm (album), a 2013 album by Freestylers
- Pirates of the Caribbean: Jack Sparrow: The Coming Storm, a Pirates of the Caribbean prequel novel
