= Songs on Endless Repeat =

2023 posthumous book by Anthony Veasna So

- Author: Anthony Veasna So
- Publisher: Ecco Press
- Publication date: December 5, 2023
- Pages: 240
- ISBN: 978-0063049963
- Preceded by: Afterparties

Songs on Endless Repeat is a 2023 posthumous collection of essays and fiction by American writer Anthony Veasna So, published by Ecco Press. It includes a foreword by Jonathan Dee, So's former advisor at the Syracuse University MFA program.

== Contents ==
Songs on Endless Repeat includes essays that originally appeared in other publications. "Journey to a Land Free of White People" and "Baby Yeah" appeared in N+1. "Manchester Street" appeared in Ninth Letter. "Duplex" appeared in The New Yorker. "A Year in Reading" appeared in The Millions. The book also includes unpublished and unfinished fiction, including parts of So's unfinished novel, Straight Thru Cambotown, which had been So's graduate thesis at Syracuse University.

== Critical reception ==
In a starred review, Kirkus Reviews wrote that "It seems impossible to read these excerpts without wishing for more—from these characters, from this narrative, for this author." Also in a starred review, Publishers Weekly called the book a "magnificent posthumous collection" and "a bittersweet testament to an astounding talent."

The New York Times wrote that the book has "the same crisp humor and edgy vulnerability that made his first an instant best seller." Electric Literature wrote that "So inched his Californian Cambodian characters not just closer to some kind of immortality, but into the world itself." The Chicago Review of Books said it "displays the same irresistible combination of sensitivity, humor, and anger that defined So’s earlier work, but it also shows him expanding in new directions." The Star Tribune lauded the unfinished Straight Thru Cambotown as having "brilliant, hilarious, at times profane and always whip-smart" prose. Los Angeles Times commended So's humor, as well as how he "captures, with effortless eloquence, the double-bind of being an Asian American."

The book made several recommended lists, including in The Boston Globe, Alta Journal, Datebook, and The Los Angeles Times.
