= Becki Jayne Harrelson =

American painter (born 1954)

- Born: 17 August 1954 (age 72)
- Years active: 1993–2012
- Notable work: The Crucifixion of Christ; Judas Kiss; Madonna, Lover & Son

Becki Jayne Harrelson (born 17 August 1954) is a painter located in Atlanta, Georgia, whose artwork combines Orthodox Christian imagery and modern, queer theology.

== Biography ==
Harrelson began painting in 1993, in response to the Don't ask, don't tell program in the U.S. military, which inspired her to "use [her] art as an activist voice". saying her art explores "contemporary and social justice issues, endeavoring to find Christ's teachings in all of us". Active since 1993, in response to don't ask, don't tell, which inspired her to "use [her] art as an activist voice". Many of her paintings have provoked controversy within the religious community, one of her paintings, The Crucifixion of Christ portraying Jesus Christ on the cross, with the label "faggot" above his head. Harrelson explained this stating, "When you view The Crucifixion of Christ, you miss the primary point if you think I'm saying Jesus was gay...Anytime anyone rises up in condemnation, hatred or violence against another, Christ is crucified". Her work appeared in Art That Dares: Gay Jesus, Woman Christ & More by Kittredge Cherry.
