= Doenges =

Doenges or Dönges is a surname. Notable people with the name include:

- Eben Dönges (1898-1968), South African politician
- Judy Doenges (fl.2019), American writer
- Karl-Werner Dönges (born 1958), West German hurdler
- Os Doenges (1905-1987), American football player and coach
