= Michael Golding (novelist) =

American novelist

- Education: Duke University
- Occupation: Novelist
- Writing career
- Notable awards: Ferro-Grumley Award (2016)
- Website: www.michaelgoldingwriter.com

Michael Golding is an American novelist. He is most noted for his 2015 novel A Poet of the Invisible World, which won the Ferro-Grumley Award and was a shortlisted finalist for the Lambda Literary Award for Gay Fiction in 2016.

An alumnus of Duke University, Golding previously published the novels Simple Prayers (1994) and Benjamin's Gift (1999), and cowrote the screenplay for the 2007 film Silk.

He came out as gay during the process of writing A Poet of the Invisible World.
