= Among Other Things, I've Taken Up Smoking =

2007 novel by Aoibheann Sweeney

- Author: Aoibheann Sweeney
- Cover artist: Stephanie Huntwork
- Language: English
- Genre: Coming-of-age
- Set in: Maine; Manhattan, New York
- Publisher: Penguin Press
- Publication date: July 19, 2007
- Publication place: United States
- Media type: Print
- Pages: 257
- Awards: Lambda Literary Award
- ISBN: 978-1-59420-130-1
- Dewey Decimal: 813.6
- LC Class: PS3619.W4425A8

Among Other Things, I’ve Taken Up Smoking is a novel by Aoibheann Sweeney, published in 2007 by Penguin Press. A girl grows up alone with her father on an island in Maine and is sent to stay in New York City with gay friends of her father's who open up her past, and her own world, in ways she cannot begin to imagine. The book was an Editor's Choice at the New York Times Book Review. It also won a Lambda Literary Award in the Lesbian Debut Fiction category at the 2008 Lambda Literary Awards.

In a review in The Washington Post, Ron Charles wrote about the way the book “taps into older, sometimes ancient stories...There’s real wisdom in these classic myths and there’s real talent in this sensitive novel.”
