= Buki Papillon =

Nigerian novelist

- Citizenship: Nigeria
- Education: University of Hull (law) Lesley University (MFA)
- Occupation: Novelist
- Writing career
- Notable work: An Ordinary Wonder (2021)
- Notable awards: Maya Angelou Book Award (2022)
- Website: www.bukipapillon.com

Buki Papillon is a Nigerian novelist. Her debut novel, An Ordinary Wonder (2021), follows an intersex child raised as a boy in Nigeria and explores family, gender and cultural expectations. It won the 2022 Maya Angelou Book Award and received a Fiction Honor at the Massachusetts Book Awards.

== Early life and education ==
Papillon was born in Nigeria and is the eldest of six children. She has said she was an avid reader from early childhood. She studied law at the University of Hull in the United Kingdom, then completed a Master of Fine Arts in creative writing at Lesley University in Cambridge, Massachusetts, United States. Lesley's alumni writing group lists her as a June 2007 fiction alumna.

== Career ==
Before becoming a novelist, Papillon worked as a travel adviser, events host and chef. Her writing has appeared in Post Road Magazine and The Del Sol Review. She is an alumna of the VONA/Voices workshops, the Vermont Studio Center and the Key West Literary Seminar.

=== An Ordinary Wonder ===
An Ordinary Wonder is Papillon's debut novel. The UK edition was published by Dialogue Books, an imprint of Little, Brown Book Group, in March 2021. The US edition followed from Pegasus Books in September 2021.

The novel is narrated by Otolorin ("Oto"), an intersex child assigned male and raised as a boy in Nigeria, who wishes to live as a girl. The story begins in 1989, when Oto is twelve, and ends in 1993, with almost all of it set in Nigeria. It draws on Nigerian culture, mythology and folklore, and the author has linked its twin characters to the high incidence of twins among the Yoruba people. The audiobook is narrated by Adjoa Andoh.

The novel was mentioned in The New York Times, Ms., Essence and Cosmopolitan UK. Scholars have also examined it in work on religion and queer identity in contemporary Nigerian literature.

=== Appearances ===
In April 2023, Papillon took part in the Visiting Writers Series at Northwest Missouri State University as a featured fiction writer. She also spoke at the Kansas City Public Library in April 2023 and appeared at the 2023 Unbound Book Festival.

== Awards and honors ==
Year	Award	Work	Result	Ref.
2022	Maya Angelou Book Award	An Ordinary Wonder	Won	
2022	Massachusetts Book Awards, Fiction	An Ordinary Wonder	Honor	
—N/a	Ferro-Grumley Award for LGBTQ Fiction	An Ordinary Wonder	Finalist	

The Kansas City Public Library reports that the 2022 Maya Angelou Book Award was the first time that prize had been given for fiction.

== Personal life ==
Papillon lives in Boston, Massachusetts.

== Bibliography ==
=== Novels ===
- Papillon, Buki (2021). An Ordinary Wonder. Dialogue Books. (UK)
- Papillon, Buki (2021). An Ordinary Wonder. Pegasus Books. ISBN 978-1-64313-781-0. (US)
