= Sergey Nabokov =

Russian poet and pedagogist, brother of the writer Vladimir Nabokov

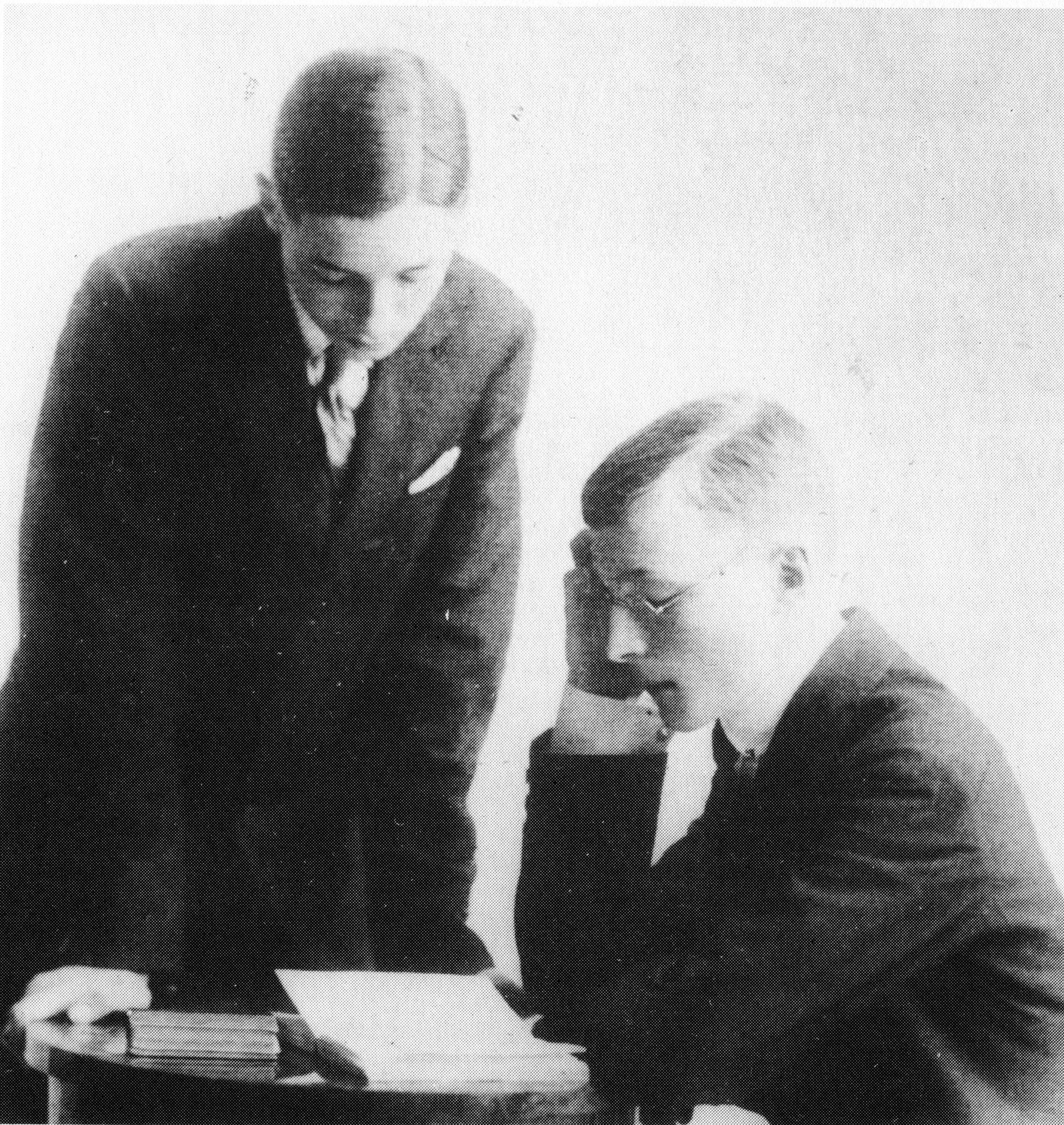
Vladimir and Sergey in 1916

Sergey Vladimirovich Nabokov (Russian: Сергей Владимирович Набоков; 12 March 1900 – 9 January 1945) was a Russian poet and pedagogue. He died in a Nazi concentration camp located in Neuengamme. He was the brother of Vladimir Nabokov.

== Life ==
=== Russia ===
Sergey was born in Saint Petersburg into the noble Nabokov family. His father was the noted Russian lawyer and statesman Vladimir Dmitrievich Nabokov. His mother, Elena Ivanovna, was the daughter of philanthropist Ivan Rukavishnikov. Sergey was the second son, being 11 months younger than Vladimir.

Unlike his older brother, Sergey was a shy, awkward boy. He had poor eyesight and a severe stutter. He developed a strong passion for music around the age of ten, playing fragments of piano operas and going to concerts with his father. He talked little with Vladimir.

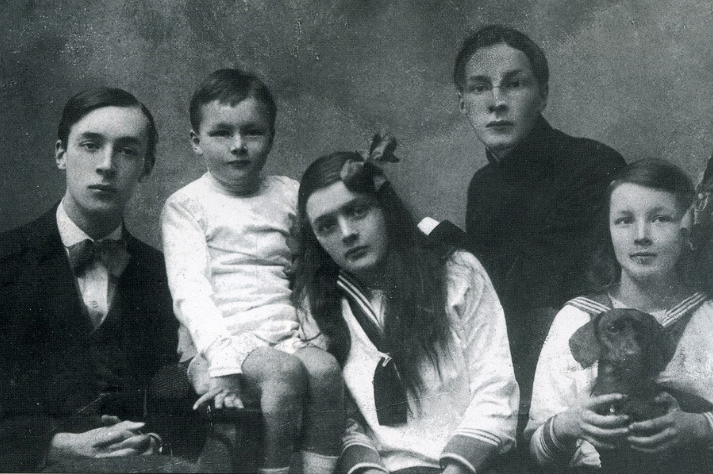
The Nabokov children in 1918 (from left to right): Vladimir, Kirill, Olga, Sergey and Elena

Sergey spent the first years of his life at the Nabokov house on Bolshaya Morskaya Street in Saint Petersburg, and at the family's suburban estate in Vyra, near Siversky. He began his education at Tenishevski's school, where he studied for five years, and then transferred to the First Junior High School.

When Sergey was 15, Vladimir found a page of his diary and gave it to his tutor, who later passed the page to the father. It implied that Sergey was homosexual. The family reacted relatively calmly to this fact, partly because Sergey's uncles Konstantin Nabokov and Vasiliy Rukavishnikov were homosexuals. According to Brian Boyd, delayed remorse provoked the intensiveness with which Vladimir Nabokov later protected his own private life. Sergey gradually became more alienated in family relations. The father, being a progressive liberal politician, ran a campaign aimed at abolishing criminal prosecution of homosexuals.

The October Revolution forced the Nabokovs to move to the Crimea. On November 2 (O.S.; 15 N.S.) 1917, Sergey and Vladimir Nabokov left Saint Petersburg forever in the sleeping car of the train to Simferopol. During their journey, soldiers escaping the front entered the carriage. According to Vladimir, his brother "a first-rate actor", faked symptoms of typhus, and the brothers were ignored. In April 1919, before the beginning of Bolshevik rule, the Nabokov family left Russia forever and settled in Berlin.

=== Europe ===
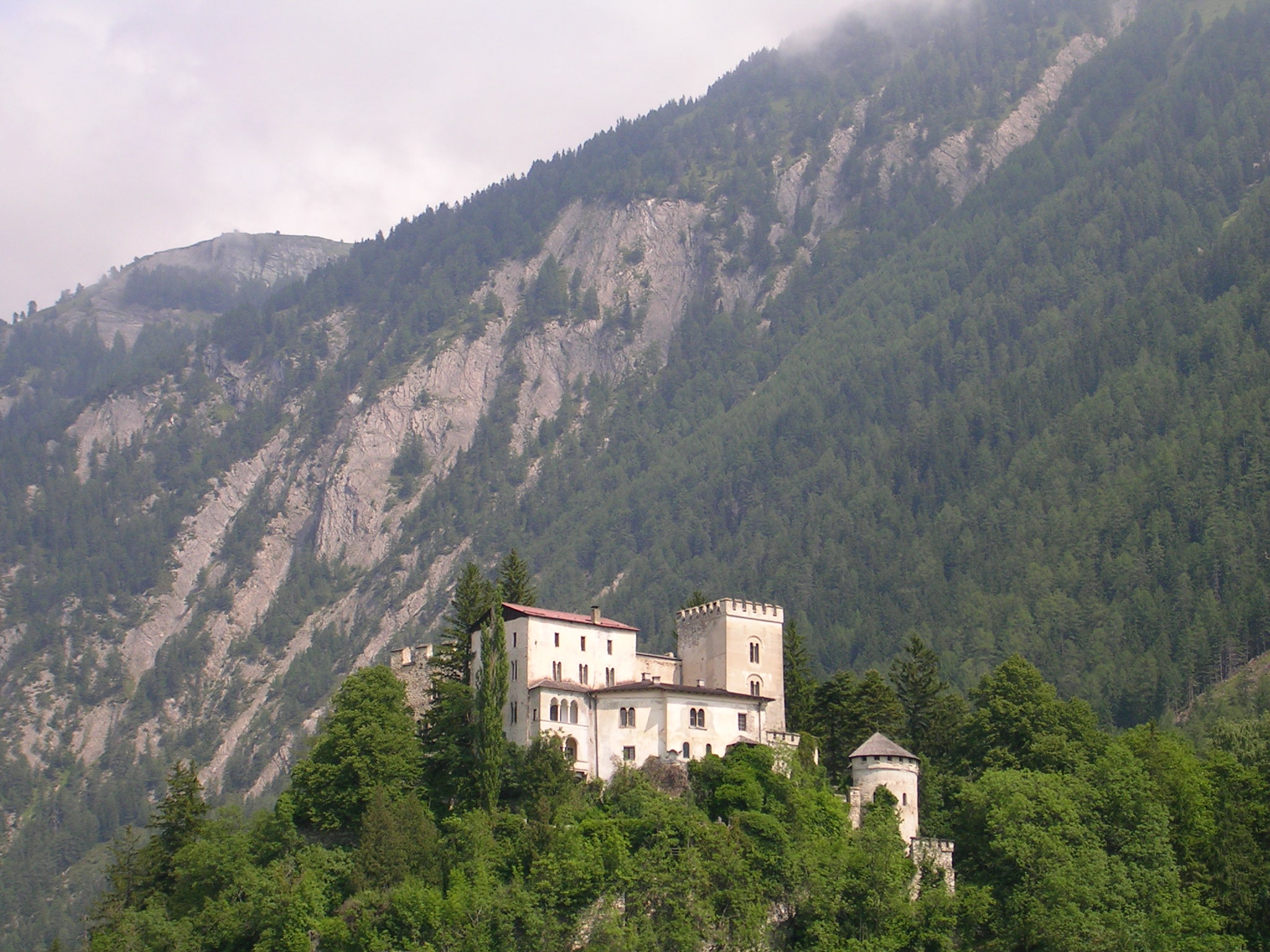
Weißenstein Castle, Matrei, East Tyrol

Sergey studied Russian and French philology at Christ's College, Cambridge, while Vladimir attended Trinity College at the same time. They spent much time together, often playing tennis. The brothers were quite different, with Sergey being tall, slim, blond, with pink skin, with an elegant aesthetic, and cheerful but sensitive.

After graduating in 1922, the brothers returned to their family in Berlin. Both tried to work in the banking sector, but were unable to do such work. Vladimir worked for only several hours total, and Sergey lasted a week. In Berlin, the brothers split up. Given the atmosphere of tolerance in Germany at the time, Sergey behaved freely, participating actively in the gay community and meeting Magnus Hirschfeld. He soon moved to Paris, where he lived in the tiny apartment of his immigrant friend Pavel Tchelitchew and Pavel's lover Allen Tanner, who introduced him to the gay cultural elite of Paris, such as Jean Cocteau, Sergei Diagilev, Virgil Thomson, and Gertrude Stein. From 1924 to 1926 he was romantically involved with a Polish painter living in Paris, Józef Czapski; the relationship ended when Czapski, who was suffering from typhus, went to London for treatment.

According to contemporaries, Sergey Nabokov was a nice, intelligent young man who spoke four languages fluently, knew French and Russian poetry, and loved music and theater, which made him very different from his brother. In Paris, he taught English and Russian while fending off starvation. He wrote poems but they are not preserved. In 1926 Sergey converted to Catholicism.

In the Paris of the late 1920s, Sergey met Hermann Thieme, the son of the Austrian insurance tycoon Carl Thieme, who became the love of his life. The two moved to Weissenstein Castle, Matrei in East Tyrol. In the 1930s, they traveled together around Europe. In the early 1930s, relations with his brother Vladimir got better: Sergey even taught him German.

=== Arrest and death ===
In 1936, Vladimir's wife, Véra, was dismissed from work as a result of the intensification of the anti-Semitic campaign in Germany. In 1937, the Nabokovs left Germany and fled to France. In May 1940, the family left Paris and came to the United States on the last New York voyage of the ocean liner SS Champlain. Sergey, not knowing his brother had left, arrived in Paris and found the apartment empty. He decided to stay in the country with his lover. However, considering the criminal proceedings against homosexual men, they decided to meet rarely so as not to arouse suspicion. Sergey continued to work as a translator in Berlin.

Despite precautionary measures, Sergey was arrested by the Gestapo in 1941 on charges of having homosexual contacts forbidden by paragraph 175 of the German Penal Code. After five months in prison, he was released due to lack of evidence, thanks to the efforts of his cousin Oni (Sofia Dmitrievna Fazold, née Nabokova, 1899–1982, elder sister of the composer Nicolas Nabokov) and was put under observation. After this incident, Sergey began to openly criticize the Nazi authorities in daily conversations.

On 24 November 1943, Sergey Nabokov was arrested again on charges of "statements hostile to the state" and "Anglo-Saxon sympathies" and on 15 December was sent to KL Neuengamme, where he was given the number 28631. The exact reason for his second arrest is unknown. Vladimir wrote that his brother was arrested as a "British spy". Some of Sergey's camp inmates claimed that he tried to hide a shot-down English pilot. Eyewitnesses said that Sergey showed exceptional resistance, helped the weak, and shared food and clothing.

On 9 January 1945, four months before the liberation of the concentration camp, Sergey Nabokov died of dysentery and hunger. Ivan Nabokov (the son of Nicolas Nabokov and cousin of Vladimir and Sergey) remembered that, after the war, people called the family to tell them of Sergey's brave behavior in the camp.

Hermann Thieme was also arrested, and sent to the front in Africa. At the end of the war, he lived in his castle, taking care of his disabled sister, and died in 1972.

== Legacy ==
=== Sergey's death and Vladimir's germanophobia ===
During the war, Vladimir Nabokov thought that Sergey was living safely in Hermann's castle. In autumn 1945, he had a dream in which Sergey died on a bunk in a concentration camp. The next day he received a letter from his younger brother Kirill, informing him of the death of Sergey. Sergey's death undoubtedly strengthened Nabokov's Germanophobia, which had taken root in the late 1930s. For example, in a letter of December 21, 1945, he informs the pastor of Christ Church, Cambridge—Gardiner M. Day—that his 11-year-old son Dmitry would not participate in the collection of clothes for German children. "I consider that every item of food and clothing given the Germans must necessarily be taken from our allies… When I have to choose between giving for a Greek, Czech, French, Belgian, Chinese, Dutch, Norwegian, Russian, Jewish or German child, I shall not choose the latter one". After returning to Europe, Nabokov never visited Germany, despite having lived there for 15 years.

=== Vladimir Nabokov's works ===
Sergey was mentioned in Vladimir's autobiography Speak, Memory: An Autobiography Revisited. According to Brian Boyd, Vladimir was tormented by the thought that he did not love his brother enough, and there was a long history of inattentiveness, mindless ridicule, and neglect. In 1945, Nabokov wrote, in a letter to E. Wilson: "The Germans sent my second brother to one of the worst concentration camps (near Hamburg), where he disappeared. This message struck me because in my opinion Sergey was the last person who, in my opinion, could have been arrested (for his "Anglo-Saxon sympathies"): a harmless, idle, touching person..."

Some literary scholars point to the possibility of Sergey Nabokov's character informing the main characters of the novels The Real Life of Sebastian Knight, Bend Sinister, and Ada or Ardor: A Family Chronicle. Others point to the complex interactions of the gay character Kinbote in the novel Pale Fire. The death of his brother and other war tragedies led Nabokov to reflect deeply on the nature of evil in the world, while also attempting to distance himself from terrible events.

While he was writing Lolita, Vladimir Nabokov began to write a novel about conjoined twins, one of whom was in love with the other, but he abandoned this idea in favor of Lolita.

=== Other works ===
In the film Mademoiselle O (1993), based on the autobiographical works of Vladimir Nabokov, the role of Sergey is played by Grigory Klalov. According to critics, the film is partly a tribute to Sergey. His image is compared with the image of the governess "Mademoiselle": after many years the author feels guilty and regrets both. In the movie, Sergey is portrayed as a nice, emotional younger brother, in sharp contrast to the cold and distant older brother.

Sergey's life is fictionalized in the novel The Unreal Life of Sergey Nabokov by Paul Russell.

== See also ==
- List of Russian-language poets
