= Caro Soles =

Canadian author

- Occupations: Novelist, short stories, anthologist
- Writing career
- Pen name: Kyle Stone
- Period: 1990s–present
- Genres: science fiction, mystery, erotica
- Notable work: Drag Queen in the Court of Death
- Notable awards: Derrick Murdoch Award
- Website: carosoles.com

Caro Soles is a Canadian author of science fiction, mystery and erotica literature, who has published work both in her own name and under the pen name Kyle Stone.

== Background ==
Previously a high school French language teacher, when Soles decided she wanted to become a writer she initially tried her hand at a romance novel, instead turning to erotica when her first attempt turned out more BDSM-themed than romantic.

== Career ==
Her erotic works, published as Kyle Stone, centred on gay male characters; in his 2002 Encyclopedia of Literature in Canada, W. H. New identified Stone as the most commercially successful author of gay literature in Canada. Many, but not all, of her Kyle Stone books were hybrids of erotica and science fiction. During this era, she also co-edited several anthologies of gay male erotica by other writers under her own name, becoming embroiled in the ongoing Canada Customs controversy around shipments to LGBT bookstores such as Glad Day and Little Sister's when her anthology Bizarre Dreams was confiscated by customs agents despite being a Canadian book.

In 2001, she decided to branch out from writing erotica, publishing her first conventional science fiction novel, The Abulon Dance, under her own name. Throughout her career as a writer, she has also taught creative writing at Toronto's George Brown College, and was a founder and organizer of the Bloody Words conference for crime writers.

== Awards ==
She was presented with the Derrick Murdoch Award by the Crime Writers of Canada in 2002, and her mystery novel Drag Queen in the Court of Death was a Lambda Literary Award nominee in the Gay Mystery category at the 20th Lambda Literary Awards.

== Works ==
=== as Kyle Stone ===
- The Initiation of PB500 (1993, ISBN 9780968677636)
- The Citadel (1994, ISBN 9781563331985)
- Rituals (1996, ISBN 9781563331688)
- Fire and Ice (1996, ISBN 9781563332975)
- Fantasy Board (1996, ISBN 9781563332128)
- The Hidden Slave (1997, ISBN 9781563335808)
- MENagerie (2000, ISBN 9780968677612)

=== as Caro Soles ===
- The Abulon Dance (2001, ISBN 9781611874143)
- The Tangled Boy (2002, ISBN 9780968677650)
- Drag Queen in the Court of Death (2007, ISBN 9781560236306)
- The Danger Dance (2007, ISBN 9781611873238)
- The Deja Dance (2012, ISBN 9781611874686)
- A Mutual Understanding (2012, ISBN 9781608207534)

=== Anthologies ===
- Bizarre Dreams (1994, ISBN 9781563331879)
- Meltdown! (1994, ISBN 9781563332036)
- Hot Bauds (1995, ISBN 9781563332852)
- Hot Bauds 2 (1997, ISBN 9781563334795)
- Bloody Words (2003, ISBN 9780968677667)
- Blood on the Holly (2007, ISBN 9780968677674)
- Don Juan and Men (2009, ISBN 9781608200467)
- nEvermore! (2015, ISBN 9781770530850)
