= Rachel M. Harper =

American novelist and academic (fl. 2026)

Rachel M. Harper is an American novelist and professor of fiction at Spalding University.

Her third novel The Other Mother won the 2023 Stonewall Book Award for literature, and was shortlisted for the Ferro-Grumley Award for LGBTQ fiction.

== Selected publications ==
- Harper, Rachel M. (2006). Brass Ankle Blues. New York: Touchstone. ISBN 978-0743276801.
- Harper, Rachel M. (2016). This Side of Providence. Altadena, California: Prospect Park Books. ISBN 978-1938849763.
- Harper, Rachel M. (2023). The Other Mother. New York: Counterpoint. ISBN 978-1640095922.
