= Paul Russell (novelist) =

American poet

- Education: Oberlin College; Cornell University
- Occupations: Novelist; poet; short story writer
- Writing career
- Notable awards: Ferro-Grumley Award (2000, 2012)
- Website: paulrussellwriter.com

Paul Russell is an American novelist, poet, and short story writer. He is a two-time winner of the Ferro-Grumley Award for LGBT fiction, in 2000 for The Coming Storm and in 2012 for The Unreal Life of Sergey Nabokov, a fictionalized portrayal of Sergey Nabokov, the gay younger brother of Russian novelist Vladimir Nabokov, about whom very little concrete biographical information is known.

Russell grew up in Memphis, Tennessee, where his father Jack was a mathematics professor at Southwestern at Memphis. He studied at Oberlin College and Cornell University. He was a professor of English literature at Vassar College.

== Works ==
=== Novels ===
- The Salt Point (1990)
- Boys of Life (1991)
- Sea of Tranquillity (1994)
- The Coming Storm (1999)
- War Against the Animals (2003)
- The Unreal Life of Sergey Nabokov (2012)
- Immaculate Blue (2015)
- The Angels Came to Sodom in the Evening (2026)

=== Non-fiction ===
- The Gay 100: A Ranking of the Most Influential Gay Men and Lesbians, Past and Present (1995)
