= Anthony Veasna So =

American author (1992–2020)

- Born: February 20, 1992; Stockton, California, U.S.
- Died: December 8, 2020 (aged 28); San Francisco, California, U.S.
- Education: Stanford University (BA); Syracuse University (MFA)
- Occupation: Writer
- Writing career
- Period: 2018–2020
- Notable work: Afterparties

Anthony Veasna So (February 20, 1992 – December 8, 2020) was an American writer. His short stories were described by The New York Times as "crackling, kinetic and darkly comedic" and often drew from his upbringing as a child of Cambodian immigrants. So died from an accidental drug overdose in 2020, and his debut book, a short story collection entitled Afterparties, was published in 2021.

== Early life and education ==
Anthony Veasna So was born on February 20, 1992, in Stockton, California, to auto repair shop owner Sienghay So and Ravy So, a retired claims representative for the Social Security Administration. So was a second-generation Cambodian American. After fleeing the Cambodian genocide to Thailand, his parents' families settled in Stockton, where they met. His parents lived in what Vulture described as an "upper-middle-class gated enclave in West Stockton". So had a large extended family: birthdays and festivities were collectively celebrated in a large family gathering and many relatives lived in close proximity to each other. With consistent good grades, So was described in his childhood as "the quiet one reading in the corner [...] smart but lacked common sense. Clumsy." So had been sickly since childhood, suffering from asthma, chronic ear infections, and numerous allergies.

He graduated from Stanford University in 2014 with bachelor's degrees in Art and English. He was a Kundiman Fellow and a Paul & Daisy Soros Fellow. In December 2020, he received a Master of Fine Arts in creative writing from Syracuse University, where he worked with Jonathan Dee and Dana Spiotta.

== Career ==
He taught at Colgate University, Syracuse University and the Center for Empowering Refugees and Immigrants in Oakland, California. Afterparties had been the subject of a bidding war between publishers; the winning publisher, Ecco, had offered him a six-figure sum for two books. His editor at Ecco said, "His writing is blazingly funny but also deeply empathetic. Those traits don’t come together that often." In January 2022 it was announced that Afterparties would be developed for television.

A second book by So, titled Songs on Endless Repeat, which includes segments of an unfinished novel he had worked on as well as nonfiction writing, was published in 2023.

At the time of So's death, he lived in San Francisco with his partner, Alex Torres. He died from a drug overdose at his residence on December 8, 2020, at age 28.

His book Afterparties was the winner of the 2022 Ferro-Grumley Award for LGBTQ literature.

== Bibliography ==
=== Books ===
- Afterparties: Stories (August 3, 2021), ISBN 0063049902
- Songs on Endless Repeat: Essays and Outtakes (December 5, 2023) ISBN 0063049961

=== Online fiction ===
- So, Anthony Veasna (February 3, 2020). "Three Women of Chuck's Donuts". The New Yorker.
- So, Anthony Veasna (March 2018). "Superking Son Scores Again". n+1.
