= Slammerkin =

2000 novel by Emma Donoghue

- First edition (UK)
- Author: Emma Donoghue
- Genre: Historical fiction
- Set in: London and the Welsh Marches, 1760s
- Publisher: Virago Press, London, HarperCollins Canada, Toronto
- Publication date: 2000
- Publication place: United Kingdom
- Awards: Ferro-Grumley Award, 2002
- ISBN: 0156007479
- Website: www.emmadonoghue.com/books/novels/slammerkin.html

Slammerkin is a historical fiction novel by Irish-Canadian author Emma Donoghue. Published in 2000, it is her third novel and is loosely based on the account of 16-year-old Mary Saunders who was hanged for murdering her mistress, Joan Jones, in Monmouth, Wales, in 1764. The crime was motivated by her longing for "fine clothes". The title is taken from an obsolete term which was used for both an 18th-century woman's dressing gown and for a sexually promiscuous woman.

Slammerkin was first published in London, England, by Virago Press. It was reissued in 2009 in Toronto by HarperCollins Canada, and once more in 2012 in New York City by Houghton Mifflin Harcourt.

== Plot summary ==
=== Part 1: London ===
Mary Saunders is a highly intelligent girl living in poverty in 1760 London. She is repelled when her mother Susan encourages her to become a seamstress, wanting nothing to do with the "wretched trades". She feels that she deserves better, and envies the hair ribbons and brightly coloured gowns of a prostitute she often sees. She agrees to kiss an old peddler for a scarlet ribbon, but is instead raped and later finds that the ribbon she was given is brown. When the resultant pregnancy becomes evident, Mary's family disown her and she is beaten and raped by a group of soldiers. She is later awakened by Doll, the prostitute she admires.

Although Doll says that it is "every girl for herself", she shelters and cares for Mary. Doll helps Mary with her appearance and teaches her how to attract customers so that she can pay for an abortion. After Mary recovers, Doll keeps Mary safe while she learns the trade, with much of their time at leisure: drinking, attending the theatre, strolling through parks, and visiting friends. After a year together, Mary notices a decline in Doll, who has dark moods, little appetite, and drinks beyond excess. Although Doll often said "a girl's clothes are her fortune" and should never be sold, she begins pawning her clothing and often has trouble paying the rent. Mary finds their roles reversed as she often watches out for Doll and goes as far as to buy back her clothes.

Mary becomes sick as a harsh winter approaches, and Doll convinces her to go to the Magdalen Hospital for penitents. Two months later, Mary is upset by a sermon about the choices women make, feeling that she has lacked any choice in her personal life. She leaves the hospital and finds Doll frozen to death in an alleyway with a bottle of gin. Mary finishes the last of the gin and takes a red ribbon from Doll's hair before covering her with a blanket. In their room, Mary finds Doll's clothing hidden under the floorboards, and is grieved to think that Doll died rather than sell them. The landlady says that Doll owed money and demands the clothes, but Mary fights with her and flees from the resident pimp. In fear for her life, Mary buys a modest dress and boards a coach for her mother's hometown of Monmouth, Wales. Lacking sufficient funds for the entire fare, Mary plays the part of a scared girl and maneuvers Joe Cadwaladyr into sleeping with her. He pays her out of guilt, and Mary borrows his writing things to forge a deathbed letter from Susan, asking for her mother's childhood friend Jane Jones to watch over Mary.

=== Part 2: Monmouth ===
Jane Jones and her husband Thomas feel compassion for Mary and take her in as a dressmaker's apprentice to Jane. Mary is adored by their young daughter Hetta, and is tempted to become a normal girl with a normal family. She considers marrying Daffy, Mr. Jones's apprentice and master of all work in the house. However, after sleeping with him in a field, she breaks their engagement because he has no higher aspirations and because she cannot provide him with children, as she was left barren following her abortion.

Joe Cadwaladyr operates a local tavern and offers to pimp for Mary. She accepts this after a time, realizing that she wishes to return to London and that prostitution is the quickest way to raise the required funds. She is able to maintain anonymity by prostituting under the name Sukie, but Mr. Jones happens to see her waiting on a customer and, in a panic, she entices him with sex. Mary is later reluctantly whipped by Mrs. Jones for laughing at a customer, though Mary suspects it was ordered by Mr. Jones for tempting him. While Mrs. Jones cares for Mary's injuries, she comes across Mary's money and confiscates it. Their relationship worsens, though Mrs. Jones cares for Mary when she subsequently falls ill.

Mary asks for her money back but learns that it was donated to the church. Mary snaps and smashes open the family safe with a kitchen cleaver, taking the money which is less than what she'd lost. She drinks from a bottle of wine and changes into one of the dresses she had made. When Mrs. Jones confronts her, Mary confesses: to being a prostitute, that her mother is alive and hates her, and that she slept with Mr. Jones. Mrs. Jones orders Mary to take the dress off and get out, and tries ripping the dress off when Mary fails to comply. Mary then takes the cleaver and lodges it in Mrs. Jones's neck. Mary tries running but is caught and held in Monmouth Gaol for three months before being hanged.

== Characters ==
- Mary Saunders: A tall, dark haired, dark eyed schoolgirl from London, England, who lives in poverty with her mother, stepfather and baby half-brother. She is 13 years old at the beginning of the novel, and is highly intelligent with the ability to read, write, and understand math in a way her peers (and many adults) cannot. She is also ambitious, wanting more for her life than going into service or joining her mother as a seamstress. Mary is raped and subsequently forced out of her home when she is found to be pregnant. She resorts to prostitution to survive on the streets of London.
- Doll Higgins: A 21-year-old prostitute who shelters Mary from homelessness. She is scarred on one side of her face from eye to jaw but is described as "the most gorgeous creature Mary had ever seen". She has a tendency to wear brightly coloured gowns and a scarlet ribbon through her hair, which is usually powdered silver or white. She becomes Mary's best friend, introducing her to prostitution, showing her the ropes, and ultimately bringing out the worst parts of her personality.
- Jane Jones: A dressmaker in Monmouth, Wales, who went to school with Susan Rhys and Cob Saunders, Mary's father. She is moved by a forged deathbed letter from Mary's mother, and convinces her husband to take Mary in and becomes a mother figure to her.
- Thomas Jones: A one-legged staymaker who is married to Jane Jones. Together they run a family business which sells dresses and corsets to the women in Monmouth. He is patient and loving with his wife and child.
- Henrietta "Hetta" Jones: The only living child of Thomas and Jane. She is an inquisitive 4-year-old with "buttermilk hair" and is described as a "porkish little glut" by Mrs. Ash.
- Nance Ash: A 39-year-old wet nurse to Hetta. She is extremely religious and spends her days poring over the bible and reciting scripture to the rest of the household. She and Mary share an almost instant dislike of one another. She had hoped that Mr. Jones would consider marrying her after his wife's death, and has her heart broken to learn of his engagement to another seamstress.
- Davyd "Daffy" Cadwaladyr: A 20-year-old manservant with sunken eyes who is a pleasant but straightforward. He doesn't get along with his father because he chose to work as an assistant to Thomas Jones instead of joining his father in running the town tavern. He is well-read and knowledgeable on many subjects. He was briefly engaged to Mary, and later becomes engaged to his cousin Gwyneth.
- Reverend Joseph "Joe" Cadwaladyr: He is Daffy's father who is "only reverend on Sundays" and runs a tavern called the Crow's Nest. Mary meets him in a coach on the way to Monmouth and tempts him into sleeping with her, making him feel so guilty afterwards that he pays for her fare. He later becomes her pimp.
- Abi: A 30-year-old maid who is from Angola but was raised as a house slave on a plantation in Barbados. She was brought to Monmouth by a doctor from Bristol, who left her as payment for his stay at Jones's. She is an unpaid servant and shares a room and the chores with Mary. At the end of the novel she is shown to be in London.
- Susan Digot, née Rhys: Mary's mother, who moved from Monmouth to London with her first husband, in the hopes of becoming a dressmaker for the nobility. She is shown to be constantly working in dirty, dark, cramped conditions, sewing together piecework while her eyesight is beginning to fail. Susan is overworked and bitter about how her life turned out. She regrets letting Cob Saunders talk her into leaving Monmouth for the chance of a better life. When Mary asks her why she never went home she replies that she's made her bed and now she must lie in it.
- William Digot: Mary's stepfather. He is a coal miner who married Susan after she was widowed. He tolerates Mary for Susan's sake, but just barely. Mary privately refers to him as the "Digot man".
- Daniel Flyte: A Quaker who helps Abi to freedom.
- Matron Elizabeth Butler: A woman in charge of the penitents in Magdalen Hospital. She is fond of Mary but lets her leave the hospital despite wanting her to stay.
- Biddy Farrel: An Irishwoman who is landlady of Rat's Castle, the building Doll and Mary live in.
- Caesar: An African pimp who also works as Mrs. Farrel's hired muscle. He is known for the long knife he carries at his waist. The scar on Doll's face was given to her by Caesar.
- Cob Saunders: Mary's father. He was a cobbler from Monmouth and Susan Digot's first husband. It was his idea to move to London for opportunity. He took part in the apocryphal Calendar Riots and died of fever in prison when Mary was 5 years old.

== Reception ==
=== Critical response ===
Michelle Kaske of Booklist found that the novel, based on true historical crimes, worked tension and moments of charm into its squalid subject matter, and showed "intricate relationships between women of limited power". She concluded, "What is most amazing is Donoghue's capacity for tackling weighty issues (prostitution, crime, and slavery) while avoiding didacticism." Natasha Tripney of The Guardian wrote, "The novel is structured in such a way that it exerts a considerable grip, the tension slowly, painfully building". She found it to be a believable fiction, never romanticising Mary, and praised Donoghue's use of costume and its associated status.

Laura Jamison of The New York Times Book Review described Slammerkin as a "heady, colorful romp of a novel" which is "almost impossible to resist". While Jamison felt that it failed in its great theme that "everyone [...] prostituted themselves one way or another", she found it to be accessible to modern readers with lively fictions completing the gaps in the recorded life of Mary Saunders. In a review for Publishers Weekly, Caroline Davidson called Slammerkin "intelligent and mesmerizing". She found that the novel provoked mixed feelings about Mary, whose drunken numbness leads to her recklessness. She concluded that, "Donoghue's characterizations are excellent, and her brutal imagery and attention to language capture the spirit of the time with vital precision."

=== Awards ===
The novel was awarded the Ferro-Grumley Award for Lesbian Fiction in 2002.
