= Ruben Reyes Jr. =

American author

Ruben Reyes Jr. is an American author. He is the author of the short story collection There Is a Rio Grande in Heaven (2024) and the novel Archive of Unknown Universes (2025).

== Early life and education ==
Reyes was born in Fontana, California, to Salvadoran immigrant parents. He grew up in Diamond Bar, California.

He studied History and Literature at Harvard College, where he founded the Latinx literary magazine Palabritas as an undergraduate. He subsequently received his Master of Fine Arts degree in fiction from the Iowa Writers' Workshop at the University of Iowa.

== Career ==
Reyes's writing has appeared in The Boston Globe, The Washington Post, AGNI, BOMB, Lightspeed, and LitHub.

=== There Is a Rio Grande in Heaven (2024) ===
Reyes's debut short story collection, There Is a Rio Grande in Heaven, was published by Mariner Books on August 6, 2024. The collection features twelve stories that blend speculative fiction, magical realism, and science fiction with themes of Central American identity and migration. Notable formal innovations in the collection include a choose-your-own-adventure-style story titled "Variations on Your Migrant Life."

Publishers Weekly gave it a starred review, as did Kirkus Reviews. Manuel Gonzales reviewed the collection for The Washington Post.

=== Archive of Unknown Universes (2025) ===
Reyes's debut novel, Archive of Unknown Universes, was published by Mariner Books on July 1, 2025. The novel follows two Salvadoran American Harvard students who investigate their families' histories during the Salvadoran Civil War using an experimental device called "The Defractor" that allows users to view alternate timelines. The narrative alternates between contemporary Cambridge in 2018 and parallel timelines set during the 1970s and 1980s civil war.

The novel was reviewed in Publishers Weekly, The Washington Post, and other publications.

== Awards and honors ==
There Is a Rio Grande in Heaven was a finalist for The Story Prize for books published in 2024. The collection was also longlisted for the PEN/Faulkner Award for Fiction, the Carnegie Medal for Excellence in Fiction, and the New American Voices Award, and was a finalist for the Ferro-Grumley Award for LGBTQ Fiction, the California Book Awards, and the Aspen Words Literary Prize.

== Personal life ==
Reyes lives in Queens, New York.

== Bibliography ==
=== Short story collections ===
- There Is a Rio Grande in Heaven (2024, Mariner Books)

=== Novels ===
- Archive of Unknown Universes (2025, Mariner Books)
