= Southland (novel) =

2003 novel by Nina Revoyr

- First edition
- Author: Nina Revoyr
- Language: English
- Genre: Novel
- Publisher: Akashic Books
- Publication date: 2003
- Publication place: United States
- Media type: Print (Hardcover or Paperback)
- Pages: 348 pp
- ISBN: 1-888451-41-6
- OCLC: 51622275
- Dewey Decimal: 813/.54 22
- LC Class: PS3568.E7964 S67 2003

Southland is a 2003 novel by Nina Revoyr. It focuses on quest for the past and present of racial justice in Los Angeles.

The novel was an Edgar Award finalist, and won the Ferro-Grumley Award and the Lambda Literary Award.

== Background ==
In an interview with Lambda Literary, Revoyr stated that the novel's first draft "was told entirely through Jackie, the young contemporary lesbian law school student". However, she then "realized that in order to tell the story of the Crenshaw area of Los Angeles, and the historical bonds between African-Americans and Japanese-Americans, we needed to meet the relevant characters where and when they lived".

== Plot ==
Southland is told in three perspectives and three decades.

In 1994, Jackie Ishida, a 25-year-old Japanese-American law school student, is mourning the recent loss of her grandfather, Frank Sakai, a Japanese-American World War II veteran who lived a philanthropic life and opened a grocery store in the Crenshaw District of Los Angeles in the 1960s. One day, Jackie's aunt, Lois, finds a shoebox in Frank's closet with $38,000, as well as an old will that named a mysterious Curtis Martindale as the beneficiary. After searching for Curtis, they learn from Curtis's cousin, James, that he was one of Frank's employees, though he was found dead in the store's freezer during the 1965 Watts riots. Though the crime was never reported, a white cop, Nick Lawson, was the primary suspect. Frank ultimately closed the store. The incident was never discussed with Frank's family, and questions arise regarding Frank's potential involvement in the act. As Jackie and James work together, their relationship deepens, which harms Jackie's long-term relationship with her girlfriend, Laura.

== Reception ==
Southland received a starred review from Booklist, who Frank Sennett highlighted how Revoyr "effortlessly" moves between timelines and perspectives, as well as how she "peoples the landscape with compelling characters who are equally believable whether they're black, Japanese, male, female, gay, or straight. With prose that is beautiful, precise, but never pretentious, she brings to vivid life a painful, seldom-explored part of L.A.'s past that should not be forgotten".

Kirkus Reviews called it "gripping" and noted that it had "some neat plot twists". However, they though it was "complicated by a byzantine narrative that shifts in time, trying to pack in too much".

Publishers Weekly called Southland "compelling", noting that is "never lack[s] in detail and authentic atmosphere". They concluded by saying "the novel cements Revoyr's reputation as one of the freshest young chroniclers of life in L.A."

Lisa Nussbaum, writing for Library Journal, said the "story line takes more twists and turns than a road full of hairpin curves", which results in "a meditation on race, cultural beliefs, opportunity, prejudice, and family obligation that drives home its messages by way of presenting and solving the murders". Nussbaum also noted that the "writing can be stilted" but that Revoyr "crafted a provocative, absorbing story with fully realized characters".

== Awards ==
Awards for Southland
Year	Award	Result	Ref.
2004	Edgar Allan Poe Award for Best Paperback Original	Finalist	
2004	Ferro-Grumley Award	Winner	
2004	Lambda Literary Award for Lesbian Fiction	Winner	
2004	Stonewall Book Award	Honor	
