= Darren Greer =

Canadian novelist (born 1968)

- Born: January 1, 1968 (age 58); Halifax, Nova Scotia, Canada
- Education: University of King's College
- Occupations: Novelist, essayist
- Writing career
- Language: English
- Years active: 2001–present
- Notable works: Still Life with June (2004); Just Beneath My Skin (2014); Advocate (2016)
- Notable awards: ReLit Award (2004); Thomas Raddall Atlantic Fiction Award (2015); Jim Connors Dartmouth Book Award (2017)

Darren Greer (born 1968) is a Canadian novelist and essayist. He is best known for his novels Still Life with June (2004), which won the ReLit Award, Just Beneath My Skin (2014), winner of the Thomas Raddall Atlantic Fiction Award, and Advocate (2016), winner of the Jim Connors Dartmouth Book Award. His fiction often examines poverty, family trauma and small-town hostility, and he has been described as an important voice in queer Canadian literature.

== Life and education ==
Greer grew up in Nova Scotia and began writing as a child. In an Atlantic Books interview he recalled discovering "the power of writing" at age eight while attending a two-room schoolhouse in Greenfield, Queens County, Nova Scotia; after he read a story aloud to classmates and they laughed, he understood how writing could move people. A high-school teacher later encouraged him to write professionally and challenged him to improve his craft. He studied at the University of King's College in Halifax.

== Writing career ==
=== Early novels and essays ===
Greer's first novel, Tyler's Cape (2001), introduced his interest in rural Nova Scotia and marginalized characters. His second novel, Still Life with June (Cormorant Books, 2004), follows Cameron Dodds, a struggling writer and recovering addict who works at a Salvation Army treatment centre and fabricates stories by appropriating clients' lives. In a discussion of the future of queer studies, Xtra magazine noted that Greer's characters are queer yet their sexual identities are not the source of their problems. Still Life with June won the 2004 ReLit Award and was a finalist for the Ferro-Grumley Award for LGBT fiction.

Greer's essay collection Strange Ghosts (2006) contains sixteen autobiographical essays ranging from travel pieces to cultural and political commentary. The opening essay, "Remembering Felix Partz", recounts Greer's recovery from cocaine addiction, his appreciation of modern art and the arts collective General Idea, his HIV diagnosis, and their influence on Still Life with June. Other essays chronicle his travels to Cambodia, his reflections on homosexuality, and in the titular essay "Strange Ghosts" the discovery of his father's indigenous heritage after being told by his white foster family he was Italian.

=== Just Beneath My Skin (2014) ===
Greer's third novel, Just Beneath My Skin, alternates between two narrators: Jake McNeil, a young man who fled the impoverished town of North River, and Nathan, the eight-year-old son he abandoned. The story explores themes of love, loss, family violence and small-town inertia. The book won the 2015 Thomas Raddall Atlantic Fiction Award.

=== Advocate (2016) ===
Greer's subsequent novel, Advocate, is set partly during the 1980s AIDS crisis. It centres on Jacob McNeil, a gay health counsellor living in Toronto who returns to his hometown of Advocate, Nova Scotia, to confront the legacy of his uncle David, who had returned home to die from AIDS. Advocate won the Jim Connors Dartmouth Book Award for fiction at the 2017 Atlantic Book Awards.

=== Later work ===
Greer published the novel Outcast in 2018, continuing his exploration of family, memory and social exclusion. He has also worked on poetry and other fiction; his short fiction and poems have appeared in periodicals such as the Harvard Gay & Lesbian Review, Found Press and Bywords Magazine.

== Activism and themes ==
Greer is an HIV/AIDS activist and has used his writing to address stigma and marginalization. His work frequently depicts characters grappling with addiction, poverty, sexuality and prejudice, and reviewers have noted his ability to capture small-town desperation and the emotional fallout of public health crises.

== Awards and honours ==
- Nominee — Pearson Readers' Choice Award (The Word On The Street, Toronto) (2003), Still Life With June.
- NOW Magazine Top Ten Books of the Year (2003), Still Life With June.
- Winner — ReLit Award (2004), Still Life With June.
- Finalist — Ferro-Grumley Award for Gay Fiction (2006), Still Life With June.
- Winner — Thomas Raddall Atlantic Fiction Award (2015), Just Beneath My Skin.
- Shortlisted — Jim Connors Dartmouth Book Award (Fiction) (2015), Just Beneath My Skin.
- Shortlisted — ReLit Award (2015), Just Beneath My Skin.
- Selected — One Book Nova Scotia (2015), Just Beneath My Skin.
- Winner — Jim Connors Dartmouth Book Award (Fiction) (2017), Advocate.
- Shortlisted — Thomas Raddall Atlantic Fiction Award (2017), Advocate.
- Finalist — Ferro-Grumley Award for LGBTQ Fiction (2017), Advocate.

== Bibliography ==
=== Novels ===
- Tyler's Cape (2001)
- Still Life with June (2004)
- Just Beneath My Skin (2014)
- Advocate (2016)
- Outcast (2018)

=== Collections ===
- Strange Ghosts (essays, 2006)

== See also ==
- ReLit Award
- AIDS in Canada
- Still Life With June
