= Nina Revoyr =

American novelist

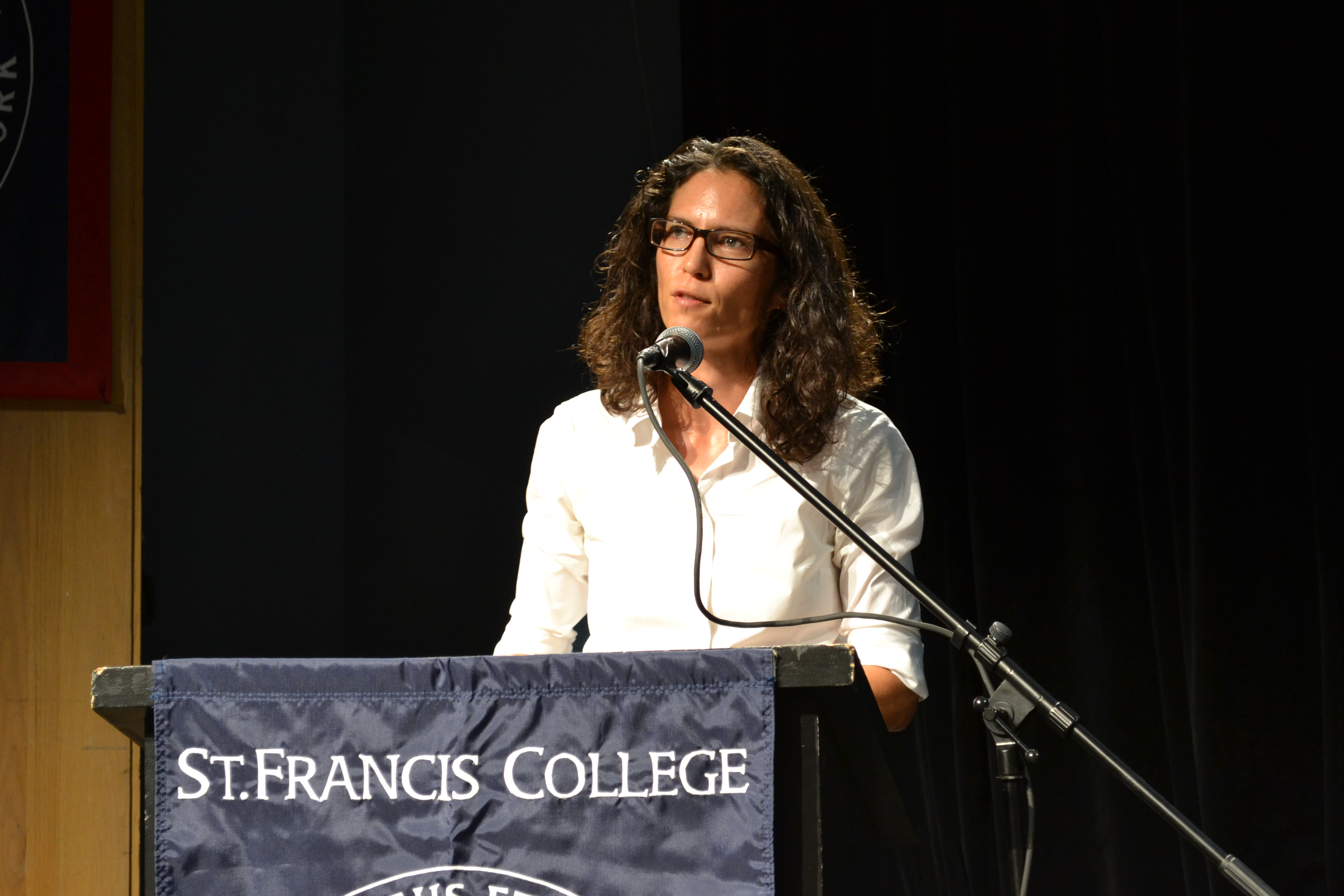
- Born: June 12, 1969 (age 57); Japan
- Occupation: Writer
- Writing career
- Period: 1990s–present
- Notable works: Southland, Wingshooters
- Notable awards: Ferro-Grumley Award (2004); Lambda Literary Award (2004); Indie Booksellers' Choice Award (2011); Midwest Booksellers Choice Award (2011)
- Website: www.ninarevoyr.com

Nina Revoyr (born June 12, 1969) is an American novelist and children's advocate, best known for her award-winning 2003 novel Southland. She is also executive vice president and chief operating officer of Children's Institute, Inc., which provides clinical, youth development, family support and early childhood services to children and families affected by trauma, violence and poverty in Central and South Los Angeles.

== Early life ==
Born in Japan to a Japanese mother and a Polish American father, she grew up in Tokyo, Wisconsin, and Los Angeles. After attending Yale University, she taught English in Japan for two years before returning to the United States, where she took an MFA in creative writing at Cornell University. She published her first novel, The Necessary Hunger, in 1997.

== Literary work ==
Mostly rooted in Los Angeles, her work is as much about place as it is about people, the communities and inhabitants most often invisible both in fiction and within the city's margins. The novels reflect a complex and evolving L.A., with an eye to the connections and tensions that develop in that proximity.

Race, class, historical context, sexual orientation and politics all play an intrinsic part in Revoyr's fiction: "Not because I'm trying to be politically correct but because that is the world as I know it." In a 2014 APA interview she elaborated "By virtue of who the characters are and the situations I put them in, I hope to compel readers to think about issues of race, community, love, family, the things we have in common, and the things that make us different. I hope to complicate and deepen what we think we know about people." In reviewing 2011's "Wingshooters," Booklist spotlighted Revoyr's "unique and affecting exploration of American racism."

While she draws much of her inspiration from urban settings —Watts, Little Tokyo, Hollywood, the Crenshaw District, Glassell Park— Revoyr's work also explores the vastness and unpredictability of the natural world, its power and its restorative possibility. In 2011's Wingshooters, she sets the novel in motion in rural Wisconsin in the 1970s, while looking at race, class and family in the context of small-town attitudes. And while Lost Canyon's protagonists are situated in disparate neighborhoods across greater Los Angeles, the Sierra becomes the challenging backdrop thorough which they move.

Several of Revoyr's books (including Southland, Wingshooters, and The Age of Dreaming) are taught and/or frequently used as part of community read programs. Southland, in particular, is taught in many colleges in courses about Los Angeles or California history or literature.

An out lesbian, she has also explored sexual identity and sexual orientation in her work. Relatedly, Revoyr utilizes that prism to examine the myriad of ways people create community and family—sometimes unexpectedly—across racial or cultural lines. Also, conversely, the books also analyze the ways in which tight-knit communities can freeze others out.

Whatever the subject or focus, "I strive to achieve [a] kind of narrative urgency in all of my novels. You want to create that sense of 'What happens next?'" she said in a 2008 interview with novelist Denise Hamilton. "Sometimes readers are more willing to go along with serious social issues and racial themes if the story is compelling."

== Social justice and children's advocacy work ==
Concurrently, Revoyr is executive vice president and chief operating officer of Children's Institute, Inc. a nonprofit which provides clinical, youth development, family support and early childhood services to children and families affected by violence and poverty in Central and South Los Angeles.

Through CII, Revoyr is currently involved in an effort to develop a new child and family service center in Watts, designed by architect Frank Gehry.

== Awards and honors ==
Her 2003 novel Southland won the Ferro-Grumley Award and the 16th Lambda Literary Award in 2004, and was an Edgar Award finalist. It was named as a Book Sense pick, and as one of the best books of 2003 by the Los Angeles Times. It was also named by the LAist as one of the "20 Novels That Dared to Define a Different Los Angeles." Her third novel, The Age of Dreaming, was published in 2008 and was a finalist for the Los Angeles Times Book Prize, and her fourth novel Wingshooters was named one of "Ten Titles to Pick Up Now" by Oprah Winfrey's O magazine, won an Indie Booksellers' Choice Award and Midwest Booksellers Choice Award, was awarded a prize for Outstanding Achievement from the Wisconsin Library Association as well as a nominee in the Lesbian Fiction category at the 24th Lambda Literary Awards.

== Bibliography ==
- The Necessary Hunger (1997, ISBN 0312181426)
- Southland (2003, ISBN 1888451416)
- The Age of Dreaming (2008, ISBN 1933354461)
- Wingshooters (2011, ISBN 1936070715)
- Lost Canyon (2015, ISBN 978-1617753534)
- A Student of History (2019, ISBN 978-1617756641)
