= Patricia Grossman =

American novelist (born 1951)

- Born: 1951 (age 74–75); Cleveland, Ohio, U.S.
- Education: Pratt Institute; Sarah Lawrence College (MFA)
- Occupation: Novelist
- Writing career
- Notable awards: Ferro-Grumley Award (2006)
- Website: www.patriciagrossman.com

Patricia Grossman (born 1951) is an American novelist. Born in Cleveland, Ohio in 1951, Grossman moved to New York City to attend Pratt Institute, where she studied drawing and painting. She has an M.F.A. in writing from Sarah Lawrence College and has published six novels, as well as two children's books.

== Awards ==
In 2006, Grossman received the Ferro-Grumley Award for Brian in Three Seasons.

== Published works ==
- Inventions in a Grieving House (1990)
- The Night Ones (1991)
- Saturday Market (1994)
- Four Figures in Time (1995)
- Unexpected Child (2000)
- Brian in Three Seasons (2005)
- Looking for Heroes (2007)
- Radiant Daughter (2010)
