= Still Life with June =

2004 novel by Darren Greer

First edition (publ. Cormorant Books)

Still Life With June is a novel by Canadian author Darren Greer that was first published in 2004. It is the second novel by Greer. It tells the story of an unsuccessful writer, Cameron Dodds, who works at a Salvation Army drug and alcohol treatment centre in an unnamed North American city and "mines" the lives of patients there for his stories. When a client at the centre hangs himself, Dodds assumes his identity and begins visiting the dead man's mentally challenged sister June in a state-run care facility.

Told in an atypical style, employing e-mails, positional statements, essays and short stories-within-a-novel amid short concise chapters, the novel was a critical success in Canada and the United States. It was a finalist for several literary prizes, including the Ferro-Grumley Award in the U.S., and won the ReLit Award in the novel category for 2004. It was optioned for film in 2006 by Amaze Films and Television.
