= Aoibheann Sweeney =

American author (born 1969)

- Born: 1969 (age 56–57); Massachusetts, U.S.
- Education: Harvard University; University of Virginia
- Writing career
- Period: Current
- Genres: Novels, book reviews
- Notable work: Among Other Things, I've Taken Up Smoking
- Notable awards: 2007 Lambda Literary Award

Aoibheann Sweeney (born 1969) is an American author.

== Biography ==
She was raised in Massachusetts and attended Harvard University and the University of Virginia's MFA Program, where she was a Henry Hoyns Fellow.

Her first novel, Among Other Things, I've Taken Up Smoking, is about a girl who grows up alone with her father on an island in Maine and is sent to stay in New York City with friends of her father, who open up her past, and her own world, in ways she could not have begun to imagine. It was published by Penguin Press in 2007 and was an Editor’s Choice at the New York Times Book Review. It also won a Lambda Literary Award in the Lesbian Debut Fiction category at the 2008 Lambda Literary Awards.

In a lengthy review in The Washington Post, Ron Charles wrote about the way the book “taps into older, sometimes ancient stories...There’s real wisdom in these classic myths and there’s real talent in this sensitive novel.” Sweeney has written for the New York Times Book Review, The Washington Post Book World, and The Village Voice Literary Supplement, and is currently the Executive Director of the Center for the Humanities at the CUNY Graduate Center. She lives in Brooklyn.

In 2011, she gave birth to a child in a taxi cab in the middle of the day in Times Square in New York City. The event was widely covered in international media, with the mother's name spelled phonetically as "Even Sweeney." Her partner is listed as "mother" in the "attending physician" section of the child's birth certificate. The two mothers now live in Ireland.
