= Trebor Healey =

American poet (born 1962)

- Born: May 1, 1962 (age 64); San Francisco, California, U.S.
- Occupations: Poet, novelist
- Writing career
- Genres: poetry, short stories, LGBT
- Website: www.treborhealey.com

Trebor Healey (born May 1, 1962) is an American poet and novelist. He was born in San Francisco, raised in Seattle, and studied English and American Literature at the University of California, Berkeley. He spent his twenties in San Francisco, where he was active in the spoken word scene of the late 1980s and early 1990s, publishing five chapbooks of poetry as well as numerous poems and short stories in various reviews, journals, anthologies and zines.

He is openly gay and is currently living in Los Angeles.

== Bibliography ==
=== Novels ===
- Through It Came Bright Colors, 2003 (Haworth Press, ISBN 978-1-56023-452-4)
- Faun, 2012 (Lethe Press, ISBN 978-1-59021-385-8)
- A Horse Named Sorrow, 2012 (University of Wisconsin Press, ISBN 978-0299289706)

=== Short stories ===
- A Perfect Scar and Other Stories, 2007 (Haworth Press, ISBN 978-1-60864-000-3)
- Eros & Dust, 2016 (Lethe Press, ISBN 978-1590216521)
- Falling, 2019 (University of Wisconsin Press, ISBN 978-0299324704)

=== Poetry ===
- Sweet Son of Pan, 2006 (Suspect Thoughts Press, ISBN 978-0-9771582-1-8)

=== Anthologies ===
- Beyond Definition: New Writing from Gay and Lesbian San Francisco, 1994 (Manic D Press, ISBN 978-0-916397-30-2). Co-editor with Marci Blackman.
- Queer and Catholic, 2008 (Taylor & Francis, ISBN 978-1-56023-713-6). Co-editor with Amie Evans.

== Awards ==
In 2004, Through It Came Bright Colors won both the Ferro-Grumley Award and the Violet Quill Award, and Gay Today named it one of the ten best novels of 2003. He won a second Ferro-Grumley Award in 2013 for A Horse Named Sorrow.

Healey's short story "The Mercy Seat" was named one of the top 10 stories of 2004 in the storySouth Million Writers Awards.

He was awarded the Jim Duggins Outstanding Mid-Career Novelists' Prize from the Lambda Literary Foundation in 2013.
