= The IHOP Papers =

2006 novel by Ali Liebegott

- First edition cover
- Author: Ali Liebegott
- Language: English
- Subject: Lesbianism
- Genre: Novel, romance
- Publisher: Carroll & Graf Publishers
- Publication date: December 13, 2006
- Publication place: United States
- Pages: 256
- ISBN: 0786717947
- OCLC: 77218088
- Dewey Decimal: 813.622
- LC Class: PS3612.I327 I36 2007

The IHOP Papers is the debut novel of American author Ali Liebegott, and was first published on December 13, 2006, by Carroll & Graf. The story revolves around a twenty-year-old lesbian named Francesca who falls in love with her female philosophy professor in junior college. Francesca eventually moves to San Francisco in order to be with her. The novel explores Francesca's difficulty with intimate relationships, as she experiences numerous lesbian relationships in San Francisco. The title of the book is a reference to the San Franciscan IHOP restaurant where she is employed.

== Plot ==
The IHOP Papers follows the life of Francesca, a disgruntled twenty-year-old virgin lesbian, originally from Southern California who falls in love with her female junior college professor, Irene. After spending some time together, Irene tells Francesca of her plan to undertake a sabbatical in San Francisco, a move that will involve residing with two of her former students—a man and a woman—who are both Irene's lovers. After revealing her amorous feelings to Irene in a letter, Francesca decides to follow her to San Francisco.

In San Francisco, Francesca moves in with Irene and her lovers, Jenny and Gustavo, in an apartment they have nicknamed "Simplicity House," where simple living and nonviolence are practiced. Initially unemployed, Francesca proceeds to search for a job and becomes a hostess at an IHOP; she is quickly promoted to a waitressing position. After a month in San Francisco, Francesca leaves Simplicity House in order to have her own apartment.

The remainder of the story follows Francesca and her intense love for Irene. Along the way, while still in love with Irene, Francesca falls in love with other women, including Jenny, Maria, Francesca's Alcoholics Anonymous sponsor, and at least two other women. A significant portion of the book is devoted to Francesca's loathing for job, especially her uniform.

The novel is written in first-person from Francesca's perspective. She is portrayed as writing the story in her apartment after her relocation to San Francisco.

== Characters ==
Francesca: The story's protagonist, Francesca is a twenty-year-old lesbian who falls in love with her female philosophy professor and moves to San Francisco to be with her.

Irene: A woman in her late-twenties who works as a philosophy professor at a junior college in Southern California, Irene takes a sabbatical to San Francisco, where she lives with two of her former students (and current lovers).

Jenny: A lesbian around the same age as Francesca, Jenny lives with Irene as one of her two lovers when the story begins.

Gustavo: Gustavo is another one of Irene's former students, and one of her two current lovers.

Maria: Maria is Francesca's Alcoholics Anonymous sponsor, whom Francesca also falls in love with.

Tom and Theresa: Tom and Theresa are Francesca's parents. Theresa constantly worries about her.

== Reception ==
The IHOP Papers received a positive review in Publishers Weekly. The reviewer called the novel "a coming-of-age coming-out in the tradition of Rita Mae Brown's Rubyfruit Jungle" with "strikingly lyrical moments in an otherwise frank narrative of a writer teetering between adolescence and adulthood." Writing for Booklist, said Liebegott's book had "an easy charm sure to win her fans." In a review by Entertainment Weekly, Katia Hetter commented, "Francesca's reminders that she's 'writing' the book can get annoying, but her story is a vivid reminder of how painful diner meals and coming out can be." The San Diego Union-Tribune said the novel was "for everyone who's been a struggling, syrup-stained, chain-smoking, journal-writing, romantic fool, lesbian or otherwise."

Authors Michelle Tea, Eileen Myles, and Sarah Shun-lien contributed positive comments for the novel's front and back covers.

The novel won the Ferro-Grumley Award for LGBT Literature in 2008.
