= Richard Canning =

English topographer and antiquary (1708–1775)

Reverend Richard Canning (30 September 1708 – 8 January 1775) was an English topographer and antiquary active for many years in Suffolk.

There is a memorial to him in St Helen's Church, Ipswich. The inscription eulogises Canning as working to put local charities in Ipswich unto a most solid foundation.

== Works ==
- 1747 Ipswich Gifts and Legacies (published anonymously)
