= Helen Elaine Lee =

African-American writer (born 1959)

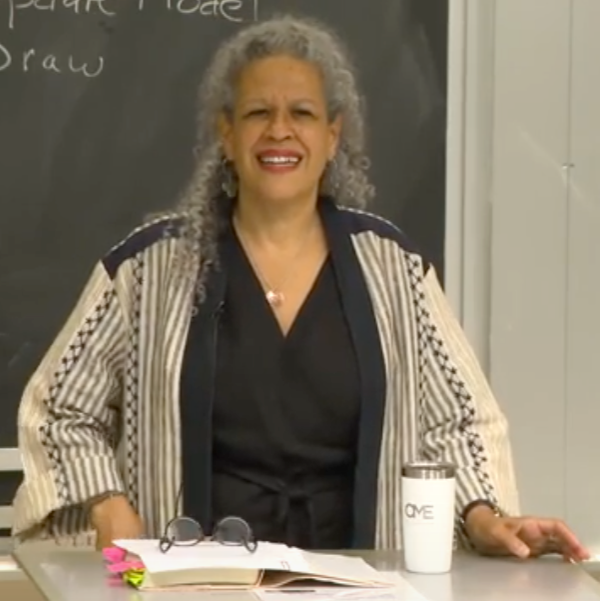
- At a reading of Pomegranate at MIT in 2023
- Born: 1959 (age 66–67); Detroit, Michigan, US
- Education: Harvard University
- Occupations: Professor, author, poet

Helen Elaine Lee (born 1959) is the Director of the Program in Women's & Gender Studies and Professor of Fiction Writing in Comparative Media Studies/Writing at Massachusetts Institute of Technology.

== Biography ==
Helen Elaine Lee was born in Detroit, Michigan to George and Dorothy Lee. George was an attorney and Dorothy was a college professor of comparative literature.

Lee earned her Juris Doctor from Harvard in 1985. She practiced law in Washington, D.C. until she could sustain herself as a writer. She started working at MIT as a professor in Comparative Media Studies program.

Lee is the Associate Chair of the Board of Directors of PEN New England. She is on the Freedom to Write Committee and helped establish its Prison Creative Writing Program.

== Published works ==
- Lee, H. E. (1994). The serpent's gift. Atheneum ; Maxwell Macmillan Canada ; Maxwell Macmillan International. ISBN 9780689121937
- Lee, H. E. (1999). Water marked: a novel. Scribner : Simon & Schuster [distributor]. ISBN 9780684838434
- Lee, H. E. (2023). Pomegranate: a novel (First Atria Books hardcover edition). Atria Books. ISBN 9781982171896
