= Hero (novel) =

2007 novel by Perry Moore

- Author: Perry Moore
- Language: English
- Genre: Novel
- Publisher: Hyperion
- Publication date: 2007
- Publication place: United States
- Media type: Print
- Pages: 432
- ISBN: 1-4231-0195-2

Hero is a 2007 Lambda-winning novel, and the only novel by film producer and novelist Perry Moore. The fantasy novel is about a teenage superhero, Thom Creed, who must deal with his ex-superhero father's disgrace, his own sexuality, and a murderer stalking the world's heroes.

== Plot summary ==
Thom Creed is a 16-year-old high school basketball star, who has a tendency to get into trouble. His mother abandoned the family several years ago, and his father Hal, a publicly disgraced ex-superhero, is now a lowly factory worker. Thom is filled with teen-aged angst because he is gay and knows that his father greatly disapproves of homosexuality. He becomes a tutor for children with reading and language disorders at the community center, and often reads to his students. After an incident during a reading session, he is moved to another class where he meets a young man named Goran. Thom mistakes Goran for a student because of his strong accent, accidentally offending him. It turns out that actually Goran is the person who started the reading program a few years before.

During a basketball game, Thom recognizes one of the players from the opposing team as Goran. Thom is thrown off his game and Goran ends up breaking one of his legs. Strangely, Thom heals Goran's injury by touching his leg over the compound fracture. He has healed others before, but does not fully understand his ability. Apparently no one notices what he has done for Goran, and when the game resumes, another player calls Thom a faggot in front of everyone. Afterwards, Thom has a seizure, which is most likely related to stress created by absorbing Goran's injuries, and his fears about his father discovering his sexual orientation. While recuperating at the hospital, he is forced to give up his driver's license and must resort to using the bus to get around.

During the summer, Thom's coach kicks him off the team due to his medical issues, though Thom gets the coach to confess that it is actually because of the comment made during the game. When he gets home, he takes his father's laptop and decides to look at porn. Thom explains that he is afraid to come out not only because of his father, but due to living in a homophobic town. While masturbating to a picture of local superhero Uberman, Hal comes home to get ready for his real estate class. Thom quickly straightens things up, but doesn't have enough time to erase his history on the computer.

When his father does leave, Thom decides to run away from home. When he falls asleep on the bus, he becomes mixed up in a battle between some villains and The League. He also encounters a mysterious man known as Dark Hero, who works alone. Thom ends up using his powers yet again on a young mother, and gets an invitation to try out for one the minor leagues. When he gets home, he discovers that Hal's former mentor Captain Victory has died. He decides not to tell his father about the tryouts, because Hal harbors intense resentment for The League. Thom is accepted as a trainee, and assigned to work with a group of other probationary heroes. The group consists of Ruth, an aging psychic, Scarlett, who can control heat, and Larry, who has the ability to give others any disease. The stress of keeping so many secrets from his father exacts a painful toll.

Soon, however, the world's superheroes begin dying under mysterious circumstances. In order to solve the mystery, Thom must reunite with his fellow outcast trainees and deal as well with society's prejudices when his secrets are revealed.

== Genesis and future books ==
Moore said he wrote the book after being upset by a Marvel Comic. In the 2005 "Enemy of the State" storyline, the gay character Northstar is killed by Wolverine (while the latter is brainwashed by The Hand). Moore believed that having one of Marvel's biggest superheroes murder its most prominent gay character sent the wrong message to readers. Moore subsequently created a list of 60 LGBTQ superheroes who have met with torture, rape, disembowelment, decapitation, had their genitalia disfigured or removed, or retconned as heterosexual. His growing awareness of the poor treatment of LGBTQ superhero characters led him to write Hero to present a more positive side.

== Critical reception ==
Reviews of Hero have been mainly positive. People magazine was unequivocal in its praise for the book. It called the novel compelling, funny, and touching, and the characters enigmatic. The Times (London) review on the publication of the UK edition was also largely positive. "Thom is devoid of the grossly stereotypical attributes that comic books link to their gay characters' sexual preference" and "The book is entertaining, though in contrast to its rich core tackling deep social issues, the writing is light..." The Advocate similarly praised the book. The gay newsmagazine applauded Moore's original superhero characters and Moore's decision to avoid making Thom Creed an outcast. The review also pointed to wittily-written descriptions of Thom masturbating to Internet porn, coming out to his father, and his first kiss. "But otherwise his play-by-play writing style can seem a bit choppy, especially in the story's more poignant moments," the review noted. Nevertheless, "Hero is a quick, at times shallow, but satisfying novel, the kind we all wanted while growing up and hopefully the first in a new genre of young adult literature." In a very brief review, Entertainment Weekly called the book "pulpy" but with good punch, and rated it an A-minus.

Publishers Weekly applauded the book for its subject matter and for expanding the genre of gay literature into superhero fantasy. But ultimately, the review noted, "the novel misses its mark, with an abundance of two-dimensional characters and contrived situations. ... While some may be glad to see a gay hero come out of the closet just in time to save the world, others may wish the situations felt less clichéd." Thom Creed was named #5 on a list of top 10 LGBT Book Characters.

Despite the somewhat reserved praise, in May 2008, Hero won a Lambda Literary Award as the best LGBT Children's/Young Adult novel of the past year.

== Sequels, and film and television adaptations ==
Moore told The New York Times in 2007 that he planned a series of book sequels featuring Thom Creed.

There were many reports that the book might be adapted for other media. Moore said in 2007 that a motion picture adaptation was in the early stages. Moore announced in May 2008 that the book might be made into a television program. "It looks like we’re going to do a TV series. There were two networks that we pitched, and we got two offers." Variety confirmed in November 2008 that Moore and Marvel Comics' Stan Lee were officially developing a television show based on Hero for the cable network Showtime. The show was to be executive produced by Lee and Gil Champion (the president of POW Entertainment, a company co-founded and co-owned by Lee), while Moore would co-produce and serve as screenwriter.

Lee revealed in April 2010, however, that Showtime had decided against producing the series. "Showtime finally didn't commit and we're now exploring our options," Lee said. Moore expressed his intent to bring the novel to television. "'Hero' will see its day onscreen. I'm not sure how or where or who will make it possible, but like all the best heroes, you have to have faith. And when it does, it will be another step forward. And some folks will think, 'Damn, it's about time someone thought of doing that.'"

Moore died on February 17, 2011. At the time of his death, Moore's father said that in early 2011 his son had been working on turning Hero into a television series on the Starz cable television channel.
