= Afterparties =

Short story collection by Anthony Veasna So

- Author: Anthony Veasna So
- Publisher: Ecco Press
- Publication date: August 3, 2021
- Pages: 260
- ISBN: 978-0-06-304990-1

Afterparties is a short story collection by writer Anthony Veasna So, published in 2021 by Ecco, an imprint of HarperCollins. The collection won the National Book Critics Circle's John Leonard Prize for Best First Book and the Ferro-Grumley Award, which is awarded to LGBTQ fiction. The story "Superking Son Scores Again" won the Joyce Carol Oates Award in Fiction from Syracuse University.

== Content ==
Afterparties centers on stories of Cambodian Americans living in Northern California, both in the Central Valley and the San Francisco Bay Area. Many of the characters are survivors of the Cambodian genocide or are the children of survivors, and the stories grapple with generational differences and the impacts of trauma. "Generational Differences" is also the title of the last story, which follows a survivor of the racially motivated 1989 Stockton schoolyard shooting. Additionally, several of the stories in Afterparties explore queerness.

The stories in Afterparties are interconnected, meaning characters from one story appear or are mentioned in other stories. All of the stories except "Human Development" were published in magazines or literary journals prior to their release in this collection.

| Title | Publication |
|---|---|
| "Three Women of Chuck's Donuts" | The New Yorker |
| "Superking Son Scores Again" | n+1 |
| "Maly, Maly, Maly" | The Paris Review |
| "The Shop" | Granta |
| "The Monks" | n+1 |
| "We Would've Been Princes" | American Short Fiction |
| "Somaly Serey, Serey Somaly" | BOMB |
| "Generational Differences" | ZYZZYVA |

== Reception ==
Several reviews noted the humor contained in many stories, woven throughout the serious subject matter. Many reviews also note the bittersweetness of the book's publication and acclaim, as the author died from an accidental drug overdose at the age of 28, less than a year before the book came out.
