= Judy Doenges =

American writer (fl.2019)

Judy Doenges is an American writer and associate professor at Colorado State University.

== Early life ==
Doenges was born in Elmhurst, Illinois.

== Writing ==
Katherine Dieckmann, in The New York Times, described Doenges' 1999 short story collection What She Left Me as "a superb debut" and the stories as "an eclectic and often wryly comical bunch, with an impressive range of protagonists".

Her What She Left Me won the 2000 Ferro-Grumley Award for lesbian literature, and her short story "Melinda", originally published in The Kenyon Review, was included in the 2011 PEN/O. Henry Prize Stories.

In 2002 she was awarded a creative writing fellowship from the National Endowment for the Arts, and wrote that she planned to use it to complete her novel The Most Beautiful Girl in the World and for research trips to Illinois and a bail recovery agent course as part of her next project, "a set of linked stories about a Chicago-area bail bond officer".

She retired from Colorado State University in 2019, having taught literature and creative writing at both undergraduate and graduate levels.

== Selected publications ==
- Doenges, Judy (1999). What she left me: stories and novella. [Middlebury, Vt.] : Hanover, NH: Middlebury College Press ; University Press of New England. ISBN 978-0874519372.
- Doenges, Judy (2006). The Most Beautiful Girl in the World. University of Michigan Regional. ISBN 978-0472115617.
- Doenges, Judy (2011). "Melinda". In Furman, Laura (ed.). PEN/O. Henry Prize Stories 2011. ISBN 9780307472373. (originally published in The Kenyon Review)
