= Hilda Raz =

American poet, educator, and editor (born 1938)

Hilda Raz (born 1938) is an American poet, educator, and editor. Raz is the author of over 14 collections of poetry and creative nonfiction. From 1987 to 2010, Raz was the editor-in-chief of Prairie Schooner and English and women's studies professor at the University of Nebraska-Lincoln. In 2021, the University's Libraries collected her papers in its archives and special collections. Raz's awards include the 1988 Nebraska Literary Association's Heritage Association's Literary Heritage Award, 2017 Nebraska 150 Books honors for Divine Honors and Best of Prairie Schooner, the 2010 Stanley W. Lindberg Award. Poet Kwame Dawes describes Raz as "a big figure in American Poetry and in the business of American poetry. We owe her a lot as a university and a state. If we value poetry in the world, we should give her a tremendous amount of credit."

Raz is the poetry series editor for the Mary Burritt Christiansen Poetry Series at the University of New Mexico and Basque Press' Poetry Editor.

Raz's work Divine Honors focuses on breast cancer. Trans describes Raz's son Aaron's gender identity. The Nebraska-centered Letters from a Place I've Never Been: New and Collected Poems 1986–2020 is edited by Kwame Dawes with an introduction by John Kinsella. In 2010 Prairie Schooner published an issue devoted to Raz's influence.
