= Perry Moore =

Film producer

- Born: William Perry Moore IV; November 4, 1971; Richmond, Virginia, U.S.
- Died: February 17, 2011 (aged 39); Manhattan, New York, U.S.
- Education: Norfolk Academy; University of Virginia
- Occupations: Film producer, novelist
- Partner: Hunter Hill (1993-2011)
- Writing career
- Period: Modern
- Genres: Fantasy; Children's literature
- Notable works: Hero; Executive producer of The Chronicles of Narnia

William Perry Moore IV (November 4, 1971 – February 17, 2011), widely known as Perry Moore, was an American author, screenwriter, and film director. He was an executive producer of The Chronicles of Narnia film series and the author of Hero, an award-winning novel about a gay teenage superhero.

== Early life ==
Born on November 4, 1971, in Richmond, Virginia, to Nancy Norris Moore and William Perry Moore III, a Vietnam War veteran and Bronze Star recipient. Moore grew up in Virginia Beach, Virginia, with two sisters, Jane and Elizabeth, and graduated high school from Norfolk Academy in 1990, where he was a student leader and athlete. Perry won several academic awards including recognition for excellence in public speaking. His classmates universally recognized Perry as a very popular student who always made everyone feel included, especially those who seemed to feel outcast. He graduated from the University of Virginia in 1994, and while in college interned at the Virginia Film Festival. He also served as an intern in the White House and at the Metro-Goldwyn-Mayer studios in New York City.

He worked on the production team for The Rosie O'Donnell Show, then joined Walden Media (a media production company created by conservative billionaire Phillip Anschutz to produce family-friendly movies, documentaries, and television programs). He was the executive in charge of production for the film I Am David, an adaptation of the Anne Holm novel North to Freedom.

== Film career ==
Moore was an executive producer of The Chronicles of Narnia: The Lion, the Witch and the Wardrobe. Moore spent several years seeking the movie rights to the seven novels by C. S. Lewis which comprise the Narnia books. His persistence proved critical for Walden Media in winning the rights; an obituary in Variety called his role "instrumental". As the New York Times reported in 2005: "At the beginning of 2001, Perry Moore embarked on a forbidding quest. Mr. Moore, an executive with an untested movie company called Walden Media, dispatched an impassioned letter to the chief executive of the C. S. Lewis Company, seeking movie rights to the much-loved Chronicles of Narnia fantasy novels." After a meeting of executives, a handshake sealed the deal for the rights. Moore continued his role as executive producer with Prince Caspian (2008) and The Voyage of the Dawn Treader (2010).

He co-wrote and co-directed (with life partner Hunter Hill) the 2008 film Lake City, a drama that tells the story of a mother (Sissy Spacek) and son (Troy Garity) who reunite under desperate circumstances years after a family tragedy drove them apart. He also co-produced (again with Hill) a Spike Jonze-directed 2010 documentary (Tell Them Anything You Want: A Portrait of Maurice Sendak) about children's book author and illustrator Maurice Sendak.

In early 2010, Moore said he and Hill were planning to co-direct a feature film to star actress Julianne Moore. The night before he died, Moore told his father that he had just secured financing for a fourth Narnia movie entitled Narnia: The Magician's Nephew based on the book The Magician's Nephew.

== Writing career ==
In addition to his work in production and development, Moore wrote The Chronicles of Narnia: The Lion, The Witch, and The Wardrobe: The Official Illustrated Movie Companion. The book was on the New York Times bestseller list in December 2005 and January 2006.

A longtime fan of children's literature and comic books, Moore's novel Hero was first published by Hyperion Books in August 2007. The young adult novel tells the story of a closeted gay teenager who becomes a superhero. In May 2008, Hero won a Lambda Literary Award as the best LGBT Children's/Young Adult novel of the past year. In 2008, Moore was in talks with veteran comic book writer Stan Lee about producing a television series based on the book. Moore began writing a sequel to Hero in 2009. Moore's father said that in early 2011 his son was working on turning Hero into a movie on the Starz cable television channel.

In February 2010, Moore said he was also at work on a new novel, Way of the Wolf, Book One: Fire, about triplets who inherit super powers and have to stop a villain from taking over the Earth.

== Personal life ==
Moore was openly gay. He lived in New York City with life partner Hunter Hill, a writer for Paper magazine. Moore was also a Christian and spoke publicly about his faith. According to family members, Moore had suffered knee and back problems before his death, which required pain medication and corrective surgery, but which he had put off to continue working.

Moore died on February 17, 2011, at age 39 of a drug overdose, his body discovered by Hill in their SoHo apartment. While an initial autopsy proved inconclusive, his death was subsequently attributed to a lethal combination of benzodiazepine, methadone, and morphine.

Having died unmarried and intestate, Moore's parents inherited his estate, including his share of a Manhattan residence, co-purchased with partner Hunter Hill in 2008. In 2012, Moore's parents asked the court of jurisdiction to require Hill, who remained in possession of the home, to either pay the estate's share of the estimated value or liquidate the asset.
