= Ali Liebegott =

American writer, actor, and comedian (born 1971)

- Born: August 8, 1971 (age 55)
- Education: MFA in Creative Writing
- Alma mater: Sarah Lawrence College
- Occupations: Writer; actor; comedian
- Writing career
- Period: 1992–present
- Genres: Poetry, fiction
- Notable works: The IHOP Papers, The Beautifully Worthless, Cha-Ching!
- Notable awards: Ferro-Grumley Award – Lesbian fiction 2008 The IHOP Papers Lambda Literary Award – Women's fiction 2008 The IHOP Papers; Lambda Literary Award – Lesbian debut fiction 2006 The Beautifully Worthless Peabody Award – Entertainment; 2015 Transparent
- Website: aliliebegott.com

Ali Liebegott (born August 8, 1971) is an American writer, actor, and comedian. She is best known for her work as a novelist and a writer/producer on the Amazon original series Transparent. Liebegott has taught creative writing at University of California, San Diego and Mills College. She is a recipient of a Poetry Fellowship from the New York Foundation for the Arts. She is the author of The Beautifully Worthless; The IHOP Papers; and Cha-Ching!. Liebegott resides in Los Angeles and recently finished her fourth book, The Summer of Dead Birds.

== Career ==
=== Nonprofit work ===
Liebegott was the managing director at RADAR Productions, a nonprofit in San Francisco whose mission is to "give voice to innovative queer and outsider writers and artists whose work authentically reflects the LGBTQA community's diverse experiences." RADAR Productions held an annual queer artists' retreat, THE RADAR LAB, in Akumal, Mexico, that Liebegott helped found and run. She has had a long relationship with small press publishing and zine making. She was the founding editor at Writers Among Artists, which published two art and poetry anthologies: Faggot Dinosaur and Vincent Van Go - Gogh.

=== Writing ===
In 2005, Liebegott published her first book, The Beautifully Worthless, on Suspect Thoughts Press. This queer, female modern day road epic follows a runaway waitress and her Dalmatian, Rorschach, across America. Liebegott wanted to subvert the epic poem by putting a queer woman at the center of the book. The Beautifully Worthless is a hybrid work of poems, letters, lists and prose pieces that form a narrative.

Liebegott has traveled the U.S. extensively, including touring on Sister Spit's Ramblin' Road Show with her longtime friend Michelle Tea. Traveling and the open road are recurrent themes in Liebegott's work, which often provides the context to explore the experiences of living on the margins from perspectives beyond that of straight male privilege. When asked about the lack of female road stories in contemporary literature, Liebegott has said that there isn't a lack of female road narratives so much as there aren't enough publishers choosing to print these works.

Liebegott's second book, The IHOP Papers, is a coming-of-age novel following a troubled queer waitress. It's set in early 1990s San Francisco during the AIDS epidemic. The novel won the Ferro-Grumley Award for LGBT Literature in 2008 and a Lambda Literary Award for Women's Fiction.

Originally inspired to write the third book in a planned trilogy (started by The Beautifully Worthless and followed by The Summer of Dead Birds), Liebegott traveled across the U.S. by train interviewing female poets. The project became The Heart has many Doors--, which takes its title from the Emily Dickinson poem of the same name. Excerpts from these interviews appeared monthly on The Believer Logger. The second book of this trilogy, The Summer of Dead Birds, had "never seen the light of day" until Feminist Press published it in 2019.

Liebegott, whose uncle was a blackjack dealer, released her novel Cha-Ching! in March 2013 co-published by City Lights and Sister Spit. Cha-Ching! follows a butch dyke named Theo who moves from San Francisco to Brooklyn and deals with addictions to gambling, alcohol and drugs.

Animals often play significant roles in Liebegott's work. She has cared for rescued dogs and cats. The 2013 reprint of The Beautifully Worthless was dedicated to Rorschach, her late dog, who inspired the character in the book. Liebegott has said that a dream of hers is to own a farm filled with rescued animals. Sometime in 2011 she rescued a street dog from Mexico and flew her back to San Francisco.

=== Television and upcoming works ===
In 2014, Liebegott joined the writing staff of Amazon's original series Transparent, created by Joey Soloway. She wrote and produced for the entire run of the show, which won a Peabody Award and multiple Golden Globe and Emmy Awards, including the Golden Globe for Best Television Series - Musical or Comedy.

==== Transparent Episodes ====
- "Wedge" (2014)
- “Man on the Land" (2015)
- “Life Sucks and Then You Die" (2016)
- “Groin Anomaly" (2017)
- “Babar the Borrible" (2017)

Liebegott's television acting work has included roles on Transparent, Maron, and Ten Days in the Valley. She also does standup throughout Los Angeles as both herself and her dog, Flaca.

Liebegott's collection of poems, The Summer of Dead Birds, was published in 2019 by the Feminist Press. She also plans to finish a novel which began as an illustrated project that includes over three hundred pen, ink, and watercolor drawings. The project, about a post-9/11 obsessive duck feeder, was started in 2001 and is titled The Crumb People.

Liebegott is a writer for The Sex Lives of College Girls and is credited with writing the second episode of the first season.

== Awards ==
Liebegott won the 2009 Ferro-Grumley Award for LGBT literature, for The IHOP Papers. She has won two Lambda Literary Awards, in the categories of Lesbian Debut Fiction for The Beautifully Worthless in 2006, and Lesbian Fiction for The IHOP Papers in 2008.

In 2015, Liebegott and the rest of the writing staff received a Peabody Award for Season 2 of Transparent.

== Works ==
- The Beautifully Worthless (Suspect Thoughts, 2005; City Lights, 2013) ISBN 978-0-87286-571-6
- The IHOP Papers (Carroll & Graf, 2007)
- Cha-Ching! (City Lights, 2013) ISBN 978-0-87286-570-9
