= Heather Lewis (writer) =

American novelist

- Born: 02/28/1961; Bedford, New York, United States
- Died: May 2002; New York
- Occupation: Novelist

Heather Lewis (c.1962–2002) was an American writer.

== Biography ==
Heather Lewis was born in Bedford, New York. She attended Sarah Lawrence College.

She was the author of three published novels. The first, House Rules (1994), details the experiences of a fifteen-year-old girl working as a show rider of horses—an experience the author herself had in her teenage years. The novel won the 1995 Ferro-Grumley Award for Lesbian Fiction. Lewis's second novel, The Second Suspect (1998), follows the struggles of a female police investigator trying to prove the guilt of a powerful and influential businessman responsible for the rape and murder of several young women. The third, posthumously published novel, Notice (2004), describes the experiences of a young prostitute, Nina and her involvement with a sadist and his wife. Lewis' former teacher, Allan Gurganus wrote an afterword for Notice. The book is essentially a re-writing of The Second Suspect from the point of view of one of the victims.

Lewis was an out lesbian, and her works explore aspects of American culture, such as the connections between power, drugs, sex, violence, love and justice.

Lewis taught at the Writer's Voice and contributed to various anthologies of literature including Best Lesbian Erotica (1996, 1997), Once Upon a Time: Erotic Fairy Tales for Women (1996), and A Woman Like That: Lesbian and Bisexual Writers Tell Their Coming Out Stories (1999). Lewis returned to New York in the fall of 2001, after a year in Arizona. She ended her life in May 2002, in New York.
