= The Coming Storm (novel) =

1999 novel by Paul Russell

- Cover of The Coming Storm
- Author: Paul Russell
- Language: English
- Genre: Novel
- Publisher: St. Martin's Press
- Publication date: August 1999
- Publication place: United States
- Media type: Hardback and paperback
- Pages: 371 (1st edition)
- ISBN: 978-0-312-20514-0

The Coming Storm is a 1999 novel by Paul Russell.

The Coming Storm is set on the campus of a boys' University-preparatory school in upstate New York. Tracy Parker, a 25-year-old, is hired as an English teacher by the headmaster Louis Tremper. Tracy has a sexual relationship with a troubled 15-year-old student. The novel touches on the transience of youth, the challenges of illegal or unconventional love, and the tragedy of sexual obsession.

== Plot ==
The story is told from the alternating perspective of four characters: Louis Tremper, the headmaster of a boy's prep school in upstate New York; his wife, Claire Tremper; Tracy Parker, the school's new 25-year-old English teacher; and Noah Lathrop III, a 15-year-old student struggling with his own sexuality.

Headmaster Louis Tremper is a repressed homosexual with a love of German opera. He hires Tracy as an English teacher at the school, Middle Forge, and is instantly attracted. He and his wife, Claire become close friends with Tracy, often inviting him over to dinner, with Louis educating and imparting his love of classic music on the young English teacher. Louis, as headmaster, has a history of having favorite boys within the school, but the relationships always closely resembled that of his new friendship with Tracy Parker – a relationship similar to the one he himself had with Jack Emmerich, the school's previous headmaster.

Claire has also developed a friendship with Tracy. Knowing full well of Louis' repressed desires, Claire accepts them knowing that even so, he has remained a faithful husband. She also admits to a lesbian crush when she was younger, with her best friend Libby, who is married to Reid. Louis and Reid have been friends for years, and it was through Reid that Claire had met Louis. It is implied that Louis had an unrequited love for Reid – who instead became a womanizer and an adulterer, eventually leaving his wife by the end of the novel.

Tracy quickly becomes a popular teacher on campus, letting the students call him by his first name. He lives alone in a big house on campus; one that was previously owned by Jack Emmerich. He quickly befriends the Trempers. He and Claire visit a dog shelter where Tracy finds Betsy, a beagle which he occasionally leaves in the care of one of his students, Noah Lathrop III. Shortly after he starts teaching, he visits friends in New York City, where it is revealed that Tracy is gay. His ex-boyfriend, Arthur Branson, who is dying of AIDS, was also formerly a student of Middle Forge, and at the time, had been one of Louis' favored students. Later it is revealed that Arthur was in an illicit relationship of his own with the school's previous headmaster, Jack Emmerich.

Noah is a troubled student who was sent to Middle Forge after having developed a crush on a teacher in his previous school. His father, Noah Lathrop II, is an overbearing alpha male running dubious business deals around the world. He's a coke fiend who has little time for his son, and is oblivious to what goes on his son's life. Noah III often sees the school counselor, wets the bed, and is on Ritalin. During a trip home to New York, he runs into Christian Tyler, a boy maliciously teased by the other boys in their dorm. Christian is gay, HIV-positive, and in a relationship with a 40-year-old doctor. Noah has his first gay experience with Chris, and eventually the boys become close friends.

Early on, Louis suspects the relationship between Tracy and Noah has grown too close – only it's not until a few months later, after many overtures by Noah, that Tracy finally gives in to his desires. They see each other clandestinely for a couple of months, until the headmaster finds out, and everything begins to unravel, including the history of what happened with Arthur Branson and Jack Emmerich and how it ruined their lives as well as Louis' life. Louis stepped in to stop the relationship, but then turned his back on Arthur when Arthur declared his homosexuality. When Tracy invited him back to the school to have dinner with the Trempers, Louis now realizes that Tracy is gay and turns his back on Tracy for the same reason. Claire eventually re-ignites her own friendship with Tracy, during which he confides in her about his forbidden relationship with Noah.

History repeats itself when Tracy panics and finally breaks off the relationship (with Noah) he knows he never should have started. Noah, feeling hurt and rejected runs away with Betsy to New York. While wandering the city at night, he loses Betsy in Central Park. Tracy finally comes clean to Louis, about the teacher-student relationship with Noah, and offers his resignation, which Louis accepts. Louis prepares to, once again, clean up the mess caused by a forbidden relationship between teacher and student. Eventually, Noah is brought back to school by his father, who is unaware that any drama other than a lost dog has occurred. Tracy's actions are kept secret, though he still resigns his teaching position.

The novel ends with Louis, the headmaster, feeling that once again he has failed the person in the situation who needed protecting most, Noah. Claire urges him to look out for the boy, since no one else will. Tracy has left the school and gone back to New York, having completely cut off any contact with the Trempers, the school, and Noah. Though Noah never says anything to his father or anyone else who might do something, Tracy nonetheless now realizes that he will spend the rest of his life feeling guilty, not for loving the boy, but for acting on it when he knew better; and not knowing if has irrevocably damaged Noah in the same way that Jack Emmerich (and inadvertently Louis) had damaged Arthur.

Unlike the three adults – Louis, Claire, and Tracy – who are left pondering their regrets and mistakes, it is Noah who gets the happy ending. Finally coming to terms with who he is, he tests negative for HIV, is no longer angry at Tracy for ending their relationship, and has finally accepted himself for who he is. He and fellow student Chris Tyler start a club for gays on campus, which allows Noah the chance to finally admit his homosexuality openly for the first time. The club is run with Louis' blessing, and the novel ends with Noah realizing that unlike Arthur, his own experiences have helped him find himself and that there is hope that his own future will be brighter and happier than Tracy and Arthur, or Louis and Claire.

== See also ==
- Lolita
