= Kittredge Cherry =

American writer and priest

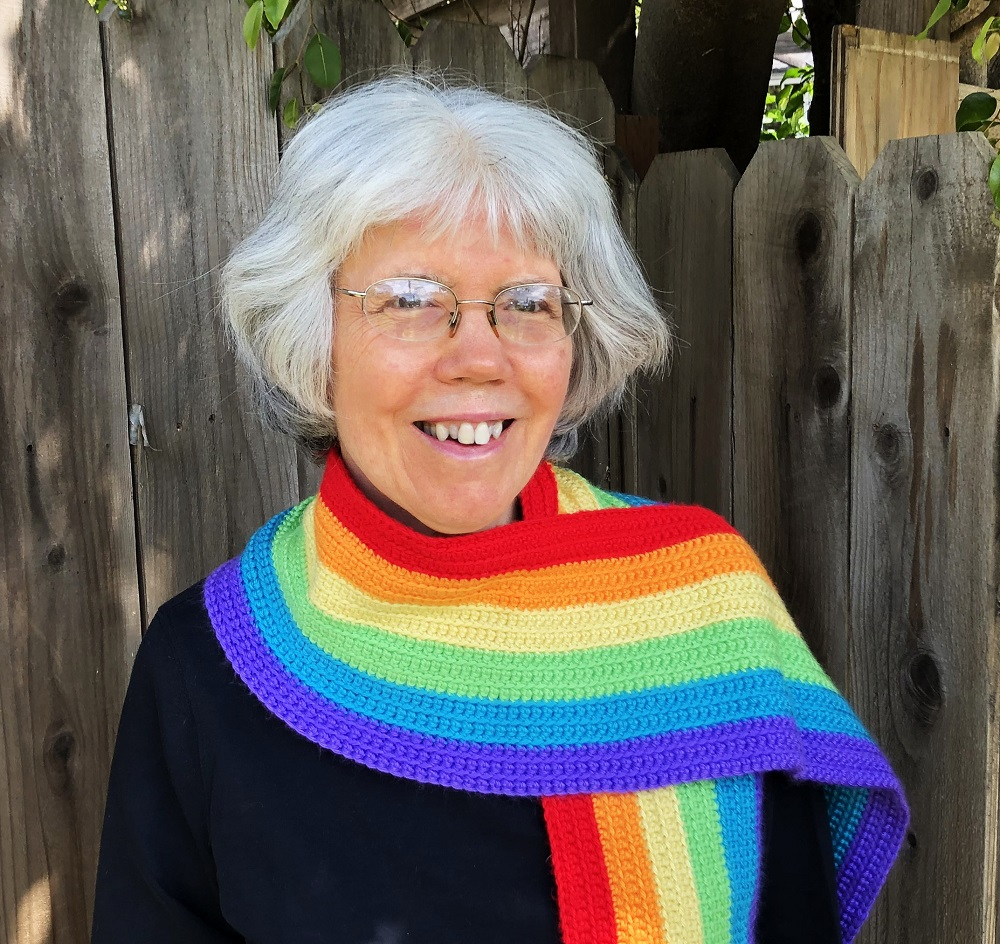
- Born: 1957; Iowa City, Iowa
- Education: Master of Divinity from Pacific School of Religion, Bachelor of Arts from University of Iowa
- Notable work: Art That Dares, 2007; Equal Rites, 1994; Womansword, 1987
- Spouse: Audrey Lockwood
- Awards: Distinguished Service Award from Metropolitan Community Churches, 1995. Lambda Literary Award finalist, 2007.
- Website: qspirit.net

Kittredge Cherry (born 1957 in Iowa) is an American author and a priest of Metropolitan Community Church.

== Biography ==
Cherry studied journalism and art history at the University of Iowa. After graduation, she worked as a newspaper journalist and studied in Japan on a Rotary International Journalism Scholarship.

She later studied Christian theology at Pacific School of Religion in Berkeley, California. She was ordained by Metropolitan Community Church (MCC), an international denomination that ministers primarily in the lesbian, gay, bisexual and transgender (LGBT) community. She worked at MCC San Francisco, and then moved to Los Angeles to serve as MCC's national ecumenical officer. One of her main duties was promoting dialogue on homosexuality at the National Council of Churches (USA) and the World Council of Churches.

As part of her ecumenical work, Cherry organized demonstrations for justice in the church, including Hands Around the God-Box at the New York offices of the National Council of Churches in June 1994. She received the Distinguished Service Award, one of MCC’s highest honors, in 1995 “for her work in International Ecumenical Relations and for planning and executing the "Hands Around the God-Box" demonstration at Stonewall 25.”

She founded Jesusinlove.org in 2005 and launched Qspirit.net in 2016. These websites focus on LGBTQ spirituality, with resources including the Rainbow Christ Prayer, co-authored with theologian Patrick S. Cheng, and the LGBTQ Saints series. The Washington National Cathedral included one of her prayers in 2021–23 services honoring Matthew Shepard, whose murder led to laws against anti-LGBTQ hate crimes. Cherry was interviewed for When We All Get to Heaven, a podcast about the AIDS crisis at Metropolitan Community Church of San Francisco that won a 2025 Peabody Award.

Cherry is the author of seven books, including Art That Dares, a finalist for the Lambda Literary Award for 2007 and the Jesus in Love series of novels. The New York Times Book Review praised her book Womansword as “a very graceful, erudite job.” Her books have been translated into German, Polish, Chinese and Japanese. She lives as an open lesbian with her life partner Audrey in Los Angeles and their papers are held at the University of Iowa's Iowa Women's Archives.

== Works ==
- 2014: The Passion of Christ: A Gay Vision (Apocryphile Press) ISBN 9781940671406
- 2008: Jesus in Love: At the Cross (AndroGyne Press) ISBN 978-1-933993-42-3.
- 2007: Art That Dares: Gay Jesus, Woman Christ and More (AndroGyne Press) ISBN 978-1-933993-29-4.
- 2006: Jesus in Love: A Novel (AndroGyne Press) ISBN 978-1-933993-18-8 German translation ISBN 978-3-940071-04-0.
- 2006: Hide and Speak: A Coming Out Guide (AndroGyne Press reprint of original 1991 HarperSanFrancisco edition) Harper ISBN 978-0-06-250165-3. AndroGyne ISBN 978-1-933993-11-9. Polish translation ISBN 978-83-246-1430-1. Chinese translation ISBN 957-9002-44-4.
- 1995: Equal Rites: Lesbian and Gay Worship, Ceremonies and Celebrations (Westminster John Knox Press) ISBN 978-0-664-25535-0.
- 1988: “We Are the Church Alive, the Church with AIDS” by Kittredge Cherry and James Mitulski, The Christian Century magazine, January 27, 1988, p. 85. Republished as a chapter in The Church with AIDS: Renewal in the Midst of Crisis by Letty M. Russell (editor), Westminster John Knox Press, 1990. ISBN 978-0664251116.
- 1987: Womansword: What Japanese Words Say About Women (Kodansha International) ISBN 0-87011-794-7 (U.S.) and ISBN 4-7700-1294-2 (Japan). 2002 edition ISBN 978-4-7700-2888-4. Japanese translation ISBN 4-8288-1197-4. 30th-anniversary edition, 2017, from Stone Bridge Press ISBN 978-1611720297.
