= Exhibit (novel) =

2024 novel by R. O. Kwon

- Author: R. O. Kwon
- Genre: Fiction, literary fiction, Korean American fiction
- Publication date: May 21, 2024
- Pages: 224
- ISBN: 978-0593190029
- Preceded by: Kink: Stories

Exhibit is a 2024 novel by South Korean–born American author R. O. Kwon, published by Riverhead Books. Kwon had been writing the novel since 2014, which happened concurrently with the revising and agenting for The Incendiaries, as well as the creation of the anthology Kink which she coedited with Garth Greenwell from 2017 to 2021.

The book won the Jim Duggins Outstanding Mid-Career Novelists' Prize from the Lambda Literary Awards in 2025.

== Synopsis ==
The novel follows a photographer, Jin Han, and a ballerina, Lidija Jung, after they meet at a party near San Francisco. From then on, the novel traces their encounters and conversations with one another as they contend with their respective artistic practices, as well as Jin's struggles to manifest her desires with her lover, Philip. The novel also makes reference to The Incendiaries primarily through Philip, an alum of the fictitious Edwards University where Kwon's debut novel was partially set.

== Critical reception ==
Kirkus Reviews observed that Kwon's style may be divisive but nonetheless remarked that the "bold, tough novel ... invites the viewer’s gaze and stares defiantly back." Publishers Weekly stated that the novel was "Hypnotic and disquieting", a "slow burn" that "will stick in readers’ minds."

Just as with The Incendiaries, critics observed the variety of issues which Kwon tackled in her second novel, including but not limited to, according to Los Angeles Review of Books, "queerness, racial identity, aesthetic vocation, domestic violence, childbearing, and parental aging" and, fundamentally, "religion, its inexplicability." Several publications, like the San Francisco Chronicle and CNN, appreciated the novel's attention to the experiences of queer women of color. The Boston Globe noted the strong presence of the "lyrical" and the "sensual" in her work, evident in both novels. Alta Journal remarked that both novels contended with an ambivalent view of faith as part of "the profound yearning for God and loss of faith that Kwon herself experienced." Some noted the rapport between the two novels, with the Chicago Review of Books finding them mutually "concerned with art and faith, love and devotion, restraint and liberation."

Many publications lauded Kwon's prose, with The New York Times in particular stating that "Chunks of her prose could also be torn out and put in a poetry book, no problem." Ryan Lackey, for the Los Angeles Review of Books, received the style more moderately: "At its best, this style is legitimately surprising, demanding a reconsideration of its objects; at times, like all sharp style, it becomes a little much."

== Influences ==
In writing the novel, Kwon found inspiration from her friends and their works, in particular Alexander Chee and his memoir How to Write an Autobiographical Novel, as well as Ingrid Rojas Contreras and her memoir The Man Who Could Move Clouds. She also was inspired by Audre Lorde and her essay "The Uses of the Erotic", as well as the styles of Clarice Lispector, Julio Cortázar, and Anne Carson. With the erotic being a strong concentration of the novel, Kwon drew upon her own observations of desire, ranging from the artistic to the "queer and kinky": "A lot of the highly ambitious women I know and love feel a great deal of pressure to hide that ambition. I got curious about this dichotomy between what people want me to want and what I feel pressure to not want."

In the years leading up to the novel's release, including promotional cycles for The Incendiaries and Kink, Kwon was vocal in several pieces about her personal history with Korean Catholicism, her identity as a queer woman, and the struggle as a result of her conflict between self and family. In a piece for The Guardian, ahead of Exhibit's publication, Kwon discussed her feelings of both shame at how her writing—"the queer, kinky, lust-fired, sexually celebrated novel"—may be received by the Korean diaspora but, as a result, felt urgency and pride to articulate queerness and sexuality through literature.

In researching the novel, Kwon took classes on ballet and photography, with specific interest in the photographs of Ren Hang. She also studied sijo verse written by kisaeng.
