= 23rd Lambda Literary Awards =

2011 literary awards ceremony

The 23rd Lambda Literary Awards were held in 2011, to honour works of LGBT literature published in 2010.

Beginning with the 2011 awards, the Lambda Literary Foundation took over the administration and presentation of the Jim Duggins Outstanding Mid-Career Novelists' Prize, formerly a program of the Saints and Sinners Literary Festival.

== Special awards ==
Category	Winner
Pioneer Award	Edward Albee, Val McDermid
Jim Duggins Outstanding Mid-Career Novelists' Prize	Alex Sánchez, Susan Stinson

== Nominees and winners ==
Category	Winner	Nominated
Bisexual Fiction	Myrlin Hermes, The Lunatic, the Lover, and the Poet	Daniel Allen Cox, Krakow Melt; Ann Herendeen, Pride/Prejudice: A Novel of Mr. Darcy, Elizabeth Bennet, and Their Forbidden Lovers; Georgeann Packard, Fall Asleep Forgetting; Malena Watrous, If You Follow Me
Bisexual Non-Fiction	Maria Pallotta-Chiarolli, Border Sexualities, Border Families in Schools	Paula Byrne, Mad World: Evelyn Waugh and the Secrets of Brideshead; Michael Gregg Michaud, Sal Mineo; Patti Smith, Just Kids; Candace Walsh and Laura Andre, Dear John, I Love Jane: Women Write about Leaving Men for Women
Gay Debut Fiction	David Pratt, Bob the Book	Chris Corkum, XOXO Hayden; Tom Mendicino, Probation; Tom Schabarum, The Palisades; Rob Stephenson, Passes Through
Gay Erotica	Jon Macy, Teleny and Camille	Hank Edwards, Vancouver Nights; William Holden, A Twist of Grimm: Erotic Fairy Tales for Gay Men; Richard Labonté, Best of the Best Gay Erotica 3; Jerry Wheeler, Tented: Gay Erotic Tales from Under the Big Top
Gay Fiction	Adam Haslett, Union Atlantic	Michael Cunningham, By Nightfall; David McConnell, The Silver Hearted; Max Schaefer, Children of the Sun; Jonathan Strong, Consolation
Gay Memoir/Biography	Justin Spring, Secret Historian: The Life and Times of Samuel Steward, Professor, Tattoo Artist and Sexual Renegade	Bryan Batt, She Ain’t Heavy, She’s My Mother; R. Tripp Evans, Grant Wood: A Life; Selina Hastings, The Secret Lives of Somerset Maugham; Gale Chester Whittington, Beyond Normal: The Birth of Gay Pride
Gay Mystery	David Lennon, Echoes	Greg Herren, Vieux Carre Voodoo; Garry Ryan, Smoked; Richard Stevenson, Cockeyed; I. E. Woodward, Rubber Baby Buggy Bumpers
Gay Poetry	Brian Teare, Pleasure	Greg Hewett, darkacre; Michael Klein, then, we were still living; James Schuyler, Other Flowers: Uncollected Poems; James L. White, The Salt Ecstasies
Gay Romance	Erik Orrantia, Normal Miguel	Michael Thomas Ford, The Road Home; Neil Plakcy, Three Wrong Turns in the Desert
Lesbian Debut Fiction	Amber Dawn, Sub Rosa	Katharine Beutner, Alcestis; Georgeann Packard, Fall Asleep Forgetting; Michael Sledge, The More I Owe You; Lois Walden, One More Stop
Lesbian Erotica	Tristan Taormino, ed., Sometimes She Lets Me: Best Butch/Femme Erotica	Kathleen Warnock and Lea DeLaria, Best Lesbian Erotica 2011; D Alexandria, This Is How We Do It: A Raw Mix of Lesbian Erotica
Lesbian Fiction	Eileen Myles, Inferno (a poet's novel)	Lucy Jane Bledsoe, Big Bang Symphony; Carol Guess, Homeschooling; Zelda Lockhart, Fifth Born II: The Hundredth Turtle; Zoe Whittall, Holding Still for as Long as Possible
Lesbian Memoir/Biography	Barbara Hammer, Hammer! Making Movies Out of Sex and Life; Julie Marie Wade, Wishbone: A Memoir in Fractures	Katherine A. Briccetti, Blood Strangers; Amie Klempnauer Miller, She Looks Just Like You: A Memoir of (Nonbiological Lesbian) Motherhood; Chely Wright, Like Me: Confessions of a Heartland Country Singer
Lesbian Mystery	Val McDermid, Fever of the Bone	Kim Baldwin and Xenia Alexiou, Missing Lynx; Stella Duffy, Parallel Lies; Ellen Hart, The Cruel Ever After; J. M. Redmann, Water Mark
Lesbian Poetry	Anna Swanson, The Nights Also	Jen Currin, The Inquisition Yours; Elizabeth J. Colen, Money for Sunsets; Eleanor Lerman, The Sensual World Re-Emerges; Laurie MacFadyen, White Shirt
Lesbian Romance	Cate Culpepper, River Walker	Georgia Beers, Starting from Scratch; Karin Kallmaker, Above Temptation; Ann Roberts, Beacon of Love; Lindsey Stone, Awakening to Sunlight
LGBT Anthology	Kate Bornstein and S. Bear Bergman, Gender Outlaws: The Next Generation	Tisa Bryant and Ernest Hardy, War Diaries; David M. Halperin and Valerie Traub, Gay Shame; Sassafras Lowrey, Kicked Out; Radclyffe, Best Lesbian Romance 2010
LGBT Children's/Young Adult	Jane Eagland, Wildthorn	Catherine Ryan Hyde, Jumpstart the World; James Klise, Love Drugged; Justin Richardson and Peter Parnell, Christian, the Hugging Lion; Vivek Shraya, God Loves Hair
LGBT Drama	Maureen Angelos, Dominique Dibbell, Peg Healey and Lisa Kron, Oedipus at Palm Springs: A Five Lesbian Brothers Play	Tarell Alvin McCraney, The Brother/Sister Plays; Bryden MacDonald, With Bated Breath; Octavio Solis, Lydia; Daniel Talbott, Slipping
LGBT Non-Fiction	Virginie Despentes, King Kong Theory	Stuart Biegel, The Right to Be Out: Sexual Orientation and Gender Identity in America’s Public Schools; Emma Donoghue, Inseparable: Desire Between Women in Literature; Noach Dzmura, Balancing on the Mechitza: Transgender in Jewish Community; Jallen Rix, Ex-Gay No Way: Survival and Recovery from Sexual Abuse
LGBT Science Fiction/Fantasy/Horror	Sandra McDonald, Diana Comet and Other Improbable Stories	Nene Adams, Flowers of Edo; Steve Berman, Wilde Stories 2010: The Year’s Best Gay Speculative Fiction; Jane Fletcher, Wolfsbane Winter; Tanith Lee, Disturbed by Her Song
LGBT Studies	Scott Herring, Another Country: Queer Anti-Urbanism; Gayle Salamon, Assuming a Body: Transgender and Rhetorics of Materiality	Deborah Cohler, Citizen Invert Queer: Lesbianism and War in Early Twentieth-Century Britain; Rafael de la Dehesa, Queering the Public Sphere in Mexico and Brazil: Sexual Rights Movements in Emerging Democracies; Fran Martin, Backward Glances: Contemporary Chinese Cultures and the Female Homoerotic Imaginary
Transgender Fiction	Zoe Whittall, Holding Still for As Long As Possible	Justin Hall, Diego Gomez, Fred Noland and Jon Macy, Glamazonia: The Uncanny Super Tranny; Catherine Ryan Hyde, Jumpstart the World
Transgender Non-Fiction	Noach Dzmura, Balancing on the Mechitza: Transgender in Jewish Community	Michelle Alexander and Michelle Diane Rose, The Color of Sunlight; Kate Bornstein and S. Bear Bergman, Gender Outlaws: The Next Generation; Kristen Schilt, Just One of the Guys?: Transgender Men and the Persistence of Gender Inequality; Rebecca Swan, Assume Nothing
