= Noel Alumit =

American novelist, actor, visual artist and activist

- Born: Baguio, Philippines
- Education: University of Southern California (BFA)
- Occupations: Novelist, Actor, Visual Artist, Activist
- Website: thelastnoel.blogspot.com

Noel Alumit is an American novelist, actor, visual artist and activist. He was identified as one of the Top 100 Influential Gay People by Out Magazine.

== Early life ==
He was born the second of four children, in Baguio, the Philippines, and raised in Los Angeles, United States. He earned his Bachelor of Fine Arts in Drama from the University of Southern California and later studied playwriting at the David Henry Hwang Writers Institute at East West Players. He received his Master of Divinity in Buddhist Chaplaincy from the University of the West.

In addition to his writing, Alumit has worked as an HIV/AIDS educator with the Asian Pacific AIDS Intervention Team in Los Angeles.He has also served as a member of an advisory board of a National Institute on drug abuse-funded study.

== Writing ==
Alumit's play Mr. and Mrs. La Questa Go Dancing was produced by Teatro Ng Tanan in San Francisco and also in Los Angeles, Santa Barbara, Boston, and Philadelphia.

His one-man show, The Rice Room: Scenes From a Bar, premiered in Santa Monica in 1999, and was later staged at San Francisco's New Conservatory Theatre Center in 2000. It was voted one of the best solo shows of the year by the San Francisco Bay Guardian, and played to sold-out houses in Los Angeles, San Francisco, Boston, Philadelphia and other cities. He also wrote and performed another successful solo show, Master of the (Miss) Universe, at Highways Performance Art Space in Santa Monica, California. Master of the (Miss) Universe was named "Best Bet" by The Los Angeles Times.

His debut novel, Letters to Montgomery Clift (MacAdam/Cage), was published in 2002, and received the 2003 Stonewall Book Award from the American Library Association, the Violet Quill Award from Insight Out Books, the Global Filipino Literary Award from Our Own Voice and the Gold Seal from ForeWord magazine. The novel centers around eight-year-old Bong Bong Luwad, who escapes the atrocities of the Philippines in the 1970s and is smuggled to Los Angeles.Bong Bong writes letters to the Ghost of Montgomery Clift asking to be reunited with his family, but as he grows older, the letters act as a form of self-discovery. Scholar Thomas Sarmiento argues that Alumit's novel demonstrates the extent of the psychological trauma of martial law in the Philippines, as well as the efforts of the marginalized communities to create alliances in defiance of colonialism.His second novel, Talking to the Moon, was released in late 2006 by Carroll & Graf. The 20th anniversary of Talking to the Moon will be out in 2026. His collection of short stories Music Heard in Hi-Fi was published in 2023 (Rebel Satori).

His work has also been published in Tilting the Continent (New Rivers Press), Take Out (Asian American Writers Workshop/Temple University), Subterraneans, DisOrient, and Lion's Roar.

== Acting credits ==
As an actor, Alumit's film and TV credits include Beverly Hills, 90210, The Young and the Restless, and Red Surf. He has performed in many Los Angeles productions, including the world premiere of Chay Yew's A Language of Their Own (LA Weekly Theater Award for Ensemble Performance) and Michael Kearns' Who's Afraid of Edward Albee.

He can be seen in Alliance (Rad Love Productions) and the forthcoming Pearls Lost directed by Rebecca Ocampo.

== Honors ==
Alumit received an Emerging Voices Fellowship from PEN Center USA West and a Community Access Scholarship to UCLA's Writers Extension, studying fiction and the personal essay form.

He was awarded the Jim Duggins Outstanding Mid-Career Novelists' Prize by the Saints and Sinners Literary Festival in 2010.

He was appointed to the California Commission on Asian and Pacific Islander American Affairs in 2012.

== Bibliography ==
- Mr. and Mrs. La Questa Go Dancing - A play about a Filipino couple dancing the night away, finding new meaning to their lives by retelling stories about their son
- The Rice Room: Scenes From a Bar (1999) - A one-man show portraying the life as a gay Asian man in Los Angeles, told through six characters
- Master of the (Miss) Universe (2001) - A one-man show describing life as a young, gay, Filipino boy growing up in the Ramparts area of Los Angeles, while using authentic video footage from various beauty contests
- Letters to Montgomery Clift (2002) - A coming of age story of Bong Bong Luwad, a Filipino boy, who enlists the spirit of 1950s screen idol Montgomery Clift to help him find his mother who is imprisoned in the Philippines under the Marcos regime
- Talking to the Moon (2006) - A magic realism story about an immigrant family and their American-raised son
