= My Body Isn't Ready =

Single by Sombr
- Released: June 25, 2026
- Genre: Pop rock; soft rock
- Length: 3:37
- Label: SMB; Warner
- Songwriter: Shane Boose
- Producers: Sombr; Tony Berg

Sombr singles chronology
"Potential" (2026)	"My Body Isn't Ready" (2026)

Music video
- "My Body Isn't Ready" on YouTube

"My Body Isn't Ready" is a song by American singer-songwriter Sombr. It was released on June 25, 2026, through Warner Records and his own imprint SMB. The song was written and produced by Sombr alongside co-production from regular collaborator, Tony Berg.

Lyrically, "My Body Isn't Ready" deals with body image issues and their subsequent impact on relationships. The music video, released the same day, features Sombr alongside actors Inde Navarrette and Josh Heuston.

== Background ==
"My Body Isn't Ready" was first teased on June 20, 2026, when Sombr posted a small snippet of the song on social media platform TikTok alongside the caption: "I wrote this song about how every time I want someone I'm too insecure about my body to do anything about it". A press release later described it as an "anthemic ballad" in which he delivers a "strikingly honest reflection on insecurity and self-worth".

Sombr performed the song live for the first time on the The Tonight Show Starring Jimmy Fallon on the day of its release.

== Recording and composition ==
"My Body Isn't Ready" is a pop rock ballad which deals with insecurity, particularly with regard to body image, and the resulting impact on one's self-esteem and intimate relationships. In an Instagram post, Sombr wrote, "I hope this song can mean different things to different people. It can be taken as a metaphor. Or it can be taken literally as a description of how I have perceived my own body, for my whole life. I wanted to write about my struggle so that other people who may also be struggling know that they are not alone. You are beautiful, and I love you." The song was written and co-produced by Sombr, alongside American producer Tony Berg.

== Critical reception ==
Lyndsey Havens of Billboard dubbed the song to be a "contemplative slow-burn" that "give[s] voice to the complicated feelings that come with moving on [from a relationship]".

== Music video ==
The music video, directed by frequent collaborator Gus Black, was released alongside the song on June 25, 2026, and features Sombr alongside American actress Inde Navarrette and Australian actor Josh Heuston. Sombr announced the video, in addition to Navarrette's guest appearance, in a video uploaded to TikTok on June 22, 2026.

=== Synopsis ===
Sombr is shown arriving at an art show hosted by Heuston's character whilst "We Never Dated" plays over the speakers. Navarrette is depicted sunbathing outside and eating watermelon before noticing Sombr, who is mocked by Heuston and the other attendees and told he does not belong there. Sombr briefly interacts with her before entering one of the rooms alone and looking at his reflection in the mirror. He then covers himself with strips of newspaper, forming a protective papier-mâché shell, leaving only his eyes visible, and pretends to be one of the exhibits. Navarrette is the only one who knows he is in there and follows along when Heuston and his friends take Sombr to a party in the city. They then throw him out of their car on top of a hill, and Navarrette gets out to remove the shell. The two of them spend the remainder of the night together exploring and are about to kiss before being interrupted by fireworks, which they watch together. Scenes of Sombr performing the song close to the camera, first in a sheer shirt and then shirtless, are interspersed throughout.

== Credits and personnel ==
Adapted from Spotify.

- Shane Boose – vocals, writing, production, bass, drums, guitar, keyboards

=== Other musicians ===
- Ruairi O'Flaherty – mastering
- Tony Berg – producer
- Will MacLellan – mixing
- Benny Bock – keyboards
- Gabe Noel – bass
- Kane Ritchotte – drums, percussion
- Meg Duffy – guitar
- Isaac Bitton – drums

== Charts ==
=== Weekly charts ===
Weekly chart performance
Chart (2026)	Peak position
Australia (ARIA)	24
Austria (Ö3 Austria Top 40)	7
Austria Airplay (MusicTrace)	15
Belgium (Ultratop 50 Flanders)	1
Belgium (Ultratop 50 Wallonia)	2
Canada Hot 100 (Billboard)	14
Canada CHR/Top 40 (Billboard)	7
Canada Hot AC (Billboard)	24
Canada Modern Rock (Billboard Canada)	32
CIS Airplay (TopHit)	52
Croatia International Airplay (Top lista)	10
Czech Republic Airplay (ČNS IFPI)	4
Denmark Airplay (Tracklisten)	9
Dominican Republic Anglo Airplay (Monitor Latino)	11
Estonia Airplay (TopHit)	11
France Airplay (SNEP)	56
Germany (GfK)	28
Germany Airplay (MusicTrace)	16
Global 200 (Billboard)	34
Ireland (IRMA)	1
Italy Airplay (EarOne)	9
Latvia Airplay (LaIPA)	16
Lebanon (Lebanese Top 20)	7
Lithuania Airplay (TopHit)	9
Luxembourg (Billboard)	15
Mexico Anglo Airplay (Monitor Latino)	10
Netherlands (Dutch Top 40)	7
Netherlands (Single Top 100)	8
Netherlands Airplay (Dutch Charts)	8
New Zealand (Recorded Music NZ)	11
New Zealand Airplay (RCS)	2
Norway (VG-lista)	11
Norway Airplay (IFPI)	89
Paraguay Anglo Airplay (Monitor Latino)	10
Poland Airplay (OLiS)	3
Portugal (AFP)	197
Romania Airplay (TopHit)	39
Russia Airplay (TopHit)	189
San Marino Airplay (SMRTV Top 50)	9
Slovakia Airplay (ČNS IFPI)	2
Slovakia Singles Digital (ČNS IFPI)	52
Slovenia Airplay (Radiomonitor)	10
Sweden (Sverigetopplistan)	8
Switzerland (Schweizer Hitparade)	11
Switzerland Airplay (MusicTrace)	28
UK Singles (Official Charts)	3
US Billboard Hot 100	26
US Adult Contemporary (Billboard)	27
US Adult Pop Airplay (Billboard)	12
US Hot Rock & Alternative Songs (Billboard)	6
US Pop Airplay (Billboard)	8

=== Monthly charts ===
Monthly chart performance
Chart (2026)	Peak position
CIS Airplay (TopHit)	66
Estonia Airplay (TopHit)	15
Lithuania Airplay (TopHit)	15
Romania Airplay (TopHit)	43

== Certifications ==
Certifications for "My Body Isn't Ready"
Region	Certification	Certified units/sales
Australia (ARIA)	Gold	35,000^{‡}
Canada (Music Canada)	Platinum	80,000^{‡}
New Zealand (RMNZ)	Gold	15,000^{‡}
United Kingdom (BPI)	Silver	200,000^{‡}
^{‡} Sales+streaming figures based on certification alone.

== Release history ==
Release dates and formats for "My Body Isn't Ready"
Region	Date	Format	Label	Ref.
Various	June 25, 2026	Digital download; streaming	SMB; Warner	
Italy	June 26, 2026	Radio airplay	Warner	
United States	June 30, 2026	Contemporary hit radio	SMB; Warner	
