= Stephen Ma =

Stephen Ma, Steve Ma, or Steven Ma may refer to:

- Stephen Ma, a multi-award nominated visual effects engineer on the films PTU, The Accidental Spy, and Running on Karma
- Stephen Ma, a lead developer on the original program for Google Maps
- Stephen Ma, a fictional character in the 2007 film The Drummer
- Stephen Ma, a poker player who participated in the 2019 World Series of Poker
- Steve Ma, Taiwanese actor
- Steven Ma, Hong Kong actor and singer
- Steven Ma (API Commissioner), Taiwanese-born American businessman
