= Exhibit =

Exhibit may refer to:

- Exhibit (legal), evidence in physical form brought before the court
  - Demonstrative evidence, exhibits and other physical forms of evidence used in court to demonstrate, show, depict, inform or teach relevant information to the target audience
- Exhibit (educational), an object or set of objects on show in a museum, gallery, archive or classroom, typically in a showcase, as part of an exhibition
- Exhibit (web editing tool), a lightweight structured data publishing framework
- Exhibit, a trade show display
- Exhibit, a novel by Korean American novelist R. O. Kwon

== See also ==
- Exhibition, an organized presentation and display of a selection of items
- Xzibit (born 1974), a rap artist and TV personality
