= Jim Duggins Outstanding Mid-Career Novelists' Prize =

American literary award

The Jim Duggins Outstanding Mid-Career Novelists' Prize is an American literary award, presented to two writers, one male and one female, from the LGBT community to honour their body of work. First presented by the Saints and Sinners Literary Festival in 2007, the award became part of the Lambda Literary Awards program in 2011. Originally presented annually, it was presented only once every three years for part of the 2010s before becoming an annual award again in the 2020s.

It is the largest literary award in the United States which is available exclusively to LGBT writers; all other LGBT literary awards, including the rest of the Lambda Literary Awards program, are open to heterosexual writers who address LGBT themes in their work.

The award was endowed by writer and academic James Duggins.

== Recipients ==
Jim Duggins Prize winners
Year	Author	Ref.
2007	Dorothy Allison	
2007	Jim Grimsley	
2008	Michelle Tea	
2008	Ronald L. Donaghe	
2009	Elana Dykewomon	
2009	Michael Lowenthal	
2010	Lee Lynch	
2010	Noel Alumit	
2011	Alex Sánchez	
2011	Susan Stinson	
2012	Brian Leung	
2012	Stacey D'Erasmo	
2013	Nicola Griffith	
2013	Trebor Healey	
2014	Michael Thomas Ford	
2014	Radclyffe	
2017	James Earl Hardy	
2017	Shani Mootoo	
2020	Larissa Lai	
2021	Brontez Purnell	
2021	Sarah Gerard	
2022	Silas House	
2022	Vi Khi Nao	
2023	Ryka Aoki	
2023	Aaron Hamburger	
2024	K. M. Soehnlein	
2024	Zelda Lockhart	
2025	R. O. Kwon	
2025	Carter Sickels	
