= Tennessee Williams & New Orleans Literary Festival =

Annual literary festival

- The Tennessee Williams & New Orleans Literary Festival Logo featuring, a streetcar in homage to A Streetcar Named Desire by Tennessee Williams
- Dates: Annually during the fourth weekend of March
- Location: French Quarter, New Orleans, Louisiana
- Years active: 1986- present
- Website: www.tennesseewilliams.net

The Tennessee Williams & New Orleans Literary Festival is an annual five-day literary festival in the city of New Orleans. The festival is dedicated to American playwright Tennessee Williams, who lived and worked in the city, and later won the Pulitzer Prize. Each year, it features several events related to the long career of that writer, as well as writing workshops, panel discussions, literary readings, stage performances, a book fair, music, writing contests, and other events related to American literature, poetry, drama, opera, film, photography, art, history, New Orleans culture, and cooking. The signature event is the Stella and Stanley Shouting Contest that closes the festival.

The festival in New Orleans is not related to the Mississippi Delta Tennessee Williams Festival in Clarksdale, Mississippi, which is held annually in October in the childhood hometown of Tennessee Williams. Other festivals around the country also commemorate this writer.

The Saints & Sinners LGBTQ+ Literary Festival is coordinated by the Tennessee Williams & New Orleans Literary Festival.

== Origin ==
Tennessee Williams was not native to New Orleans, but he lived in New Orleans's French Quarter at several points in his adult life. Two of his major plays, A Streetcar Named Desire and Vieux Carré, and several short stories were set in the historic French Quarter. Shortly after Williams's death in 1983, the city of New Orleans happened to undergo an economic recession. Among the proposals to attract tourists to the city and revitalize the local economy, the festival was created was to establish a literary festival dedicated to Williams. The choice to host the festival in New Orleans was to honor the cultural and literary achievements associated with New Orleans, as Williams felt that some of his best work was written while he lived in New Orleans.

The first Tennessee Williams Festival was a two-day event held in 1986, drawing an estimated 500 attendees. The topic of the first literary panel was “New Orleans As A Home For Writers" and Panelists included Fredrick Barton, Christopher Blake, Sheila Bosworth, Everette Maddox, and Christ Wiltz. It was moderated by Ralph Adamo. The festival quickly grew in popularity; it now attracts over 10,000 attendees every year.

In March 2006, the festival was the first major event to be held in New Orleans following the disaster of the 2005 Hurricane Katrina. On slightly higher ground, the French Quarter was not among the areas that were flooded during the disaster. The festival continued and grew in popularity until a brief hiatus in 2020 due to the COVID-19 pandemic. However, it was resumed virtually in 2021 and then in person in 2022.

Principal sponsors of the Festival include the Louisiana Endowment for the Humanities, the Historic New Orleans Collection, the National Endowment for the Arts, and the University of New Orleans.

=== Events ===
The five-day Festival is held on the weekend nearest March 26, the birthday of Tennessee Williams. This is usually the fourth week of March. Festival events are held at several sites in and around the French Quarter.

Many of these events are either speakers or discussion panels, featuring experts from literature, theater, film, the arts, history, culture, and other topics. In addition to these panels, there are master classes for aspiring writers, including advice from published writers, literary agents, and editors in the publishing industry. Another highlight during the early festival years was an “I Remember Tennessee” panel. Sharing their memories were Bill Grey, Jack Fricks, Bob Hines, Anna May Maylie, Dan Mosely, Eric Paulsen, and Jere Real.

The Festival also hosts musical performances by local musicians. Musical guests over the years have included artists such as Vernel Bagneris, Danny Barker, Spencer Bohren, Tom Sancton, Butch Thompson, Allen Toussaint, and Dr. Michael White.

Past speakers have included prominent authors and playwrights such as Edward Albee, Robert Olen Butler, Richard Ford, Michael Cunningham, Phillip Caputo, Rick Bragg, and Yusef Komunyakaa. Other speakers have included writers Anne Rice, Cokie Roberts, Michael Cunningham, John Waters, Nora Roberts, Stephen E. Ambrose, Douglas Brinkley, James Carville, Andrei Codrescu, Sue Grafton, Margaret Atwood, Larry Brown, Margaret Walker, Fannie Flagg, Allen Gilchrist, Kaye Gibbons, Dorothy Allison, Barry Gifford, Rex Reed, Peggy Scott Laborde, and Errol Laborde, as well as actors Patricia Clarkson, Stephanie Zimbalist, Alec Baldwin, John Goodman, W. Kenneth Holditch, Tab Hunter, Dixie Carter, Gerald McRaney, Elizabeth Ashley, Anne Jackson, Eli Wallach, and Kim Hunter. Tennessee Williams's brother, Dakin Williams, was a frequent guest at the Festival until his death in 2008.

Another major feature of the Festival is its theatrical productions, including productions of full-length plays and one-act plays by Tennessee Williams, as well as works by other writers. In 1992, the Festival began hosting a one-act play contest. The winning plays are premiered at the Festival, and have become one of the Festival's most anticipated events. The Festival also sponsors poetry and short fiction contests.

The Festival highlights other contemporary Southern artists, such as the New Orleans novelist John Kennedy Toole and other writers from New Orleans. Still, Tennessee Williams remains a primary focus of the Festival. The Festival has published previously unpublished writings and produced premiere performances of newly discovered works. A scholars conference is held every year, and an academic journal, The Tennessee Williams Annual Review, is associated with this conference. Since the first festival in 1986, events have included a guided walking tour to 722 Toulouse St. and other French Quarter residences where Williams once lived.

Since 1996, the Festival has ended with the popular Stella and Stanley Shouting Contest, a tribute to the third scene from A Streetcar Named Desire. The contest is open to the public and held on the last day of the Festival, usually Sunday afternoon, in Jackson Square. Actors playing the role of Stella and Stanley provoke the contestants from a gallery from one of the Pontalba Buildings. After the first round of tryouts, a second round takes place, where finalists compete for prizes and trophies.

The COVID-19 pandemic caused 2020's festival to go on hiatus and in 2021 the festival was fully virtual. In 2022, the festival returned to in-person status with the festival celebrating the 75th Anniversary of A Streetcar Named Desire.
