= Wildthorn =

2010 novel by Jane Eagland

- Front cover
- Author: Jane Eagland
- Language: English
- Genre: Historical fiction; Young adult novel
- Publisher: Houghton Mifflin
- Publication date: September 1, 2010
- Publication place: United Kingdom
- Pages: 352
- Awards: Lambda Literary Award
- ISBN: 9-780-54757736-4

Wildthorn is a novel for young adults written by Jane Eagland and published by Houghton Mifflin in 2010. Set in the Victorian era United Kingdom, it tells the story of Louisa Cosgrove as she spends her time locked in a mental asylum for women, where she falls in love for Eliza, one of the attendants.

== Reception ==
The School Library Journal praised Eagland for her skill with filling the main character's backstory, as well as for her "job of depicting the 'real' Louisa in the end". The review concluded by noting "[t]eens will identify with her frustration at not being believed". Kirkus Reviews said that "[d]espite a too-pat ending, Louisa and Eliza provide a window into a shameful history of mental health care and women's incarceration that only ended in living memory."

A review published by Publishers Weekly calls the book an "unusual romance" and mentions the author's ability to convey "the atrocities and filth of the asylum with shocking vividness". The reviewer also commends the romance between the main character and the attendant, saying it was built "tenderly and expertly" by Eagland.

Wildthorn received a Lambda Literary Award in the Children's/Young Adult category.
