= Ann Herendeen =

American author of popular fiction

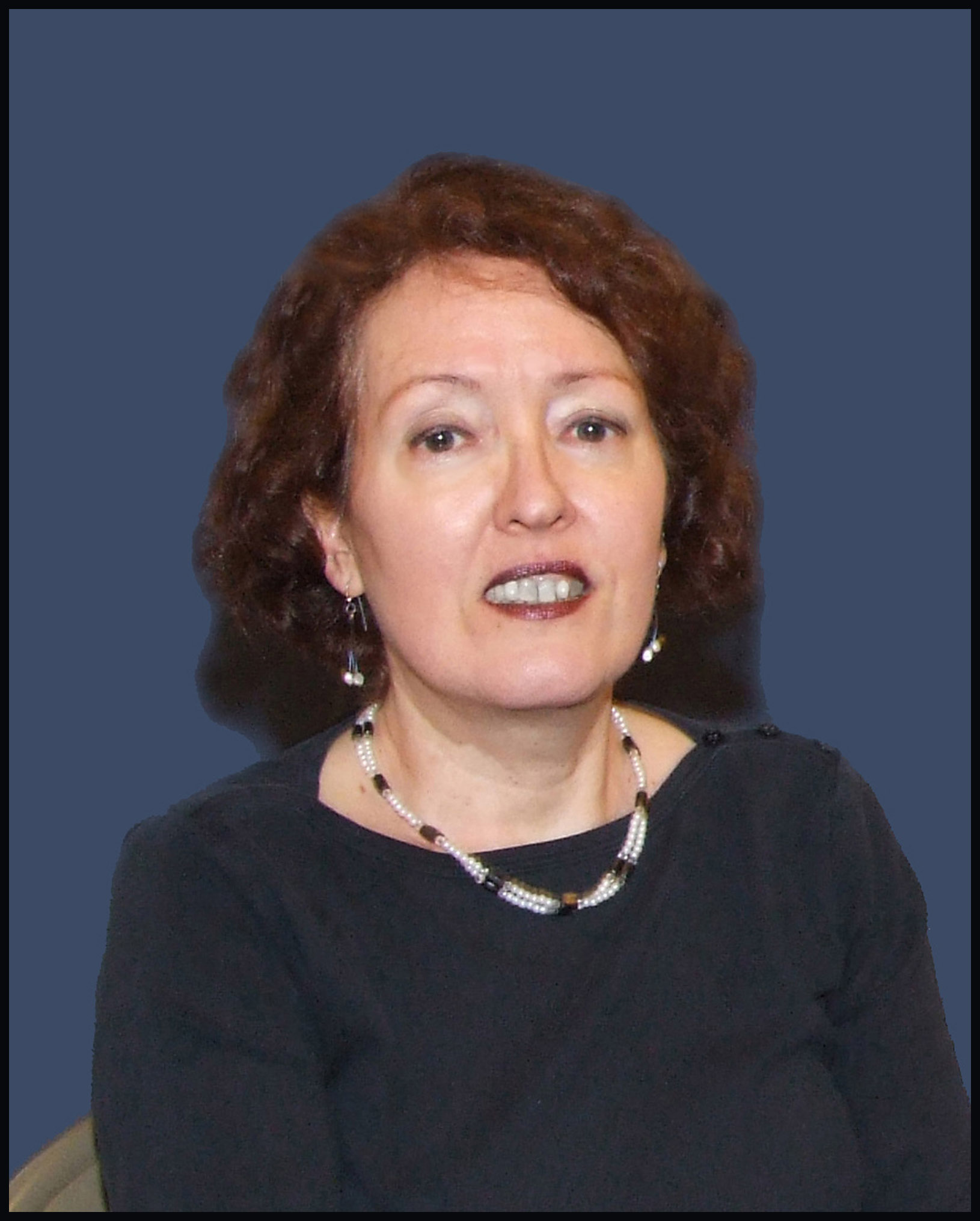
- Herendeen in 2010
- Education: Princeton University
- Writing career
- Genres: LGBT literature, historical romance, sword and sorcery
- Website: www.annherendeen.com

Ann Herendeen is an American author of popular fiction. Herendeen's novels are notable for their queering of the traditional romance novel.

== Background ==
A native New Yorker and lifelong Brooklyn resident, Herendeen graduated with high honors in English from Princeton University. She also holds a Master of Library Science degree from Pratt Institute.

== Phyllida and the Brotherhood of Philander ==
Herendeen's first novel Phyllida and the Brotherhood of Philander, was initially issued by a subsidy publisher with the subtitle A Bisexual Regency Romance, in 2005. Harper Collins released a slightly altered version of the book in 2008 without that subtitle. Herendeen's atypical Regency Romance introduces a central same-sex love story into a Regency-set tale of a marriage of convenience which otherwise obeys many of the conventions of genre romance. The heroine Phyllida, an author, offers the hero a quid pro quo of "irregular" liberty in marriage - his sexual freedom for her literary and professional freedom. The novel delivers the generically required account of the development of the couple's erotic and tender bonds through trials to deep and permanent commitment, while Phyllida's authorship supplies Herendeen's text with a common metafictional feature of postmodern genre romance: a novel-within-the-novel, exploring forbidden sexuality in the fashionable manner of the era. Passages of Phyllida's fiction are rendered as pastiches of the great Gothic tradition (e.g. Charles Maturin, Ann Radcliffe, Matthew "Monk" Lewis, Clara Reeve, Mary Shelley) the language and conventions of which are at once mocked and relished.

According to Herendeen:

[Phyllida and the Brotherhood of Philander] took a traditional Georgette Heyer form of the Regency romance —- a witty, drawing-room comedy of manners -- sexed it up, and queered it by making the hero “slightly bisexual” .... The idea was to use all the clichés or standard tropes of these m/f [male & female] romances -— the alpha male rakish hero, the marriage of convenience, and the Bertie Wooster-ish group of the hero’s friends —- to tell an m/m/f romance, giving the hero a hea [happily ever after] with his wife and his boyfriend.

McDaniel College's Pamela Regis, author of A Natural History of the Romance Novel, brings forward Phyllida and the Brotherhood of Philander as evidence against what she contends is the myth of the genre's fundamentally socially reactionary nature. In her article in the new edition of The Cambridge History of the American Novel, Regis argues:

In [Phyllida and the Brotherhood of Philander], sentimental values domesticate sexual practices and family structures that were (and still are in some cases) against the law. Novels like Phyllida show that the romance novel, once derided for its heteronormative ideology, is proving more inclusive than society at large. ("Female Genre Fiction in the 20th Century," in The Cambridge History of the American Novel, 2011 p. 857)

== Pride/Prejudice ==
Herendeen's second novel Pride/Prejudice is a slash fiction contribution to the immense catalogue of mash-ups, sequels, fan fiction, retellings, updatings, spin-offs and homages to Jane Austen's celebrated novel. Pride/Prejudice narrates Austen's original story unearthing the "forbidden" intimacies between Mr. Darcy and Mr. Bingley and between Elizabeth Bennet and Charlotte Lucas. Salon's reviewer Laura Miller noted that Herendeen's language in Pride/Prejudice is the most successful of the Austen derivatives in "approximating Austen's style without aping it."

The novel was 2010 Lambda Literary Award finalist in the category "bisexual fiction" category.

== ECLIPSIS: Lady Amalie's Memoirs ==
Herendeen is the author of a series of "sword-and-sorcery" fantasy novels. The first novel in the series, Recognition, was self-published as an ebook in 2011.

== Critical and scholarly work ==
Herendeen is one of a growing number of romance authors (e.g. Jennifer Crusie, Pam Rosenthal, Lauren Willig, Jayne Ann Krentz) and academics to take genre romance seriously as an object of study, and not only through the lens of sociology. Herendeen has delivered talks and participated in panels at conferences devoted to her genre. Her talk, "Having It Both Ways, or Writing From the Third Perspective: The Revolutionary M/M/F Ménage Romance Novel" was presented at Princeton University's 2009 conference: "Love as the Practice of Freedom? Romance Fiction and American Culture", an event which changed the status of research into genre romance. At the 2011 International Association for the Study of Popular Romance conference in NY, Herendeen participated in the panel "The Erotics of Property", delivering a paper entitled "The Upper-Class Bisexual Top as Romantic Hero: (Pre)Dominant In the Social Structure and in the Bedroom."

== Bibliography ==
- 2008 Phyllida and the Brotherhood of Philander: A Novel Harper Paperbacks (ISBN 0061451363) (A slightly different version of the book, entitled Phyllida and the Brotherhood of Philander: A Bisexual Regency Romance was released by Herendeen in 2005 through a subsidy publisher.)
- 2010 Pride/Prejudice Harper Paperbacks (ISBN 0061863130)
- 2011 Recognition, the first volume of the fantasy series ECLIPSIS: Lady Amalie's Memoirs, ebook
- 2011 "A Charming Menage," short story, in Gay City: Volume 4: At Second Glance CreateSpace (ISBN 1466458291)

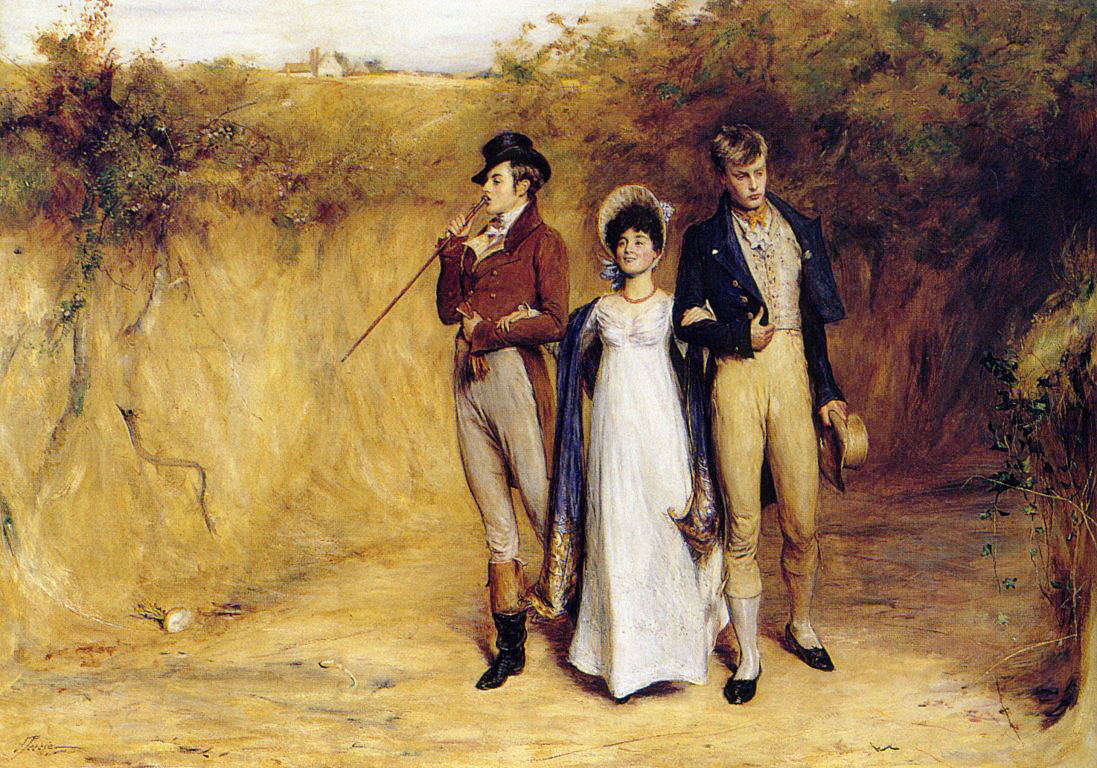
Two Strings To Her Bow by John Pettie (1882) is a fantasy of the Regency Dandy from the era of Oscar Wilde and the Edwardian Dandy. It features on the cover of the 2008 Harper Paperback edition of Phyllida and the Brotherhood of Philander.
