= Stacey D'Erasmo =

American novelist

- Born: 1961 (age 64–65); New York City, U.S.
- Education: Barnard College (BA); New York University (MA)
- Occupations: Author; literary critic
- Writing career
- Notable awards: Lambda Literary Award (2004); Ferro-Grumley Award (2004); Jim Duggins Outstanding Mid-Career Novelists' Prize (2012)

Stacey D'Erasmo (born 1961) is an American author and literary critic.

== Biography ==
D'Erasmo was born in 1961 in New York City. She received a B.A. from Barnard College and an M.A. from New York University in English and American literature. From 1988 to 1995, she was a senior editor at The Village Voice Literary Supplement. She was a Stegner Fellow in fiction at Stanford University from 1995 to 1997. She created and developed the fiction review section of Bookforum from 1997 to 1998. She received a Guggenheim Fellowship in fiction in 2009. She was the 2010–11 Sovern/Columbia Affiliated Fellow at the American Academy in Rome.

D'Erasmo is the author of four novels and one book of nonfiction. Her first novel, Tea, was selected as a New York Times Notable Book for 2000. Her second novel, A Seahorse Year (2004), was named a San Francisco Chronicle best seller and won both a Lambda Literary Award and a Ferro-Grumley Award. Her third novel was The Sky Below (2009). Her fourth novel, Wonderland, was named NPR's Best Book of 2014; a Time Top Ten Fiction Book of 2014; a New York Times Book Review Editors’ Choice; and a BBC Top Ten Book of 2014. Her nonfiction book The Art of Intimacy: The Space Between was published in 2013.

D'Erasmo's articles and podcasts have been published in The New York Times Book Review, New York Times Magazine, Ploughshares, Interview, The New Yorker, and the Los Angeles Times. She has been a faculty member at the Bread Loaf Writers Conference.

She is currently an associate professor of writing at Fordham University.

== Awards ==
- Lambda Literary Award for A Seahorse Year (2004)
- Ferro-Grumley Award for A Seahorse Year (2004)
- Guggenheim Fellowship in Fiction (2009)
- Jim Duggins Outstanding Mid-Career Novelists' Prize (2012)

== Works ==
=== Fiction ===
- Tea (2000)
- A Seahorse Year (2004)
- The Sky Below (2009)
- Wonderland (2014)
- The Complicities (2022)

=== Nonfiction ===
- The Art of Intimacy: The Space Between (2013)
- D'Erasmo, Stacey (2024-07-09). The Long Run. Minneapolis: Graywolf Press. ISBN 978-1-64445-292-9.
