= How to Write an Autobiographical Novel =

2018 essay collection by Alexander Chee

- Author: Alexander Chee
- Genre: Memoir, autobiography, essay collection
- Publisher: Mariner Books
- Publication date: April 17, 2018
- Pages: 288
- ISBN: 978-1328764522
- Preceded by: The Queen of the Night

How to Write an Autobiographical Novel is a 2018 essay collection by American writer Alexander Chee, published by Mariner Books. The essays, spanning Chee's life as a writer and teacher, cover topics ranging from life, literature, politics, higher education, and Korean and queer identities. The book was included on Time Magazine's 10 Best Nonfiction Books of the Year. It was a finalist for the Lambda Literary Award for Gay Memoir or Biography, as well as the PEN/Diamonstein-Spielvogel Award for the Art of the Essay.

== Content ==
Chee began putting together the book after being asked to speak at Columbia University by Lis Harris. One of Harris' requests to Chee was asking him to put together some of his essays to send to her students. After Chee blogged about his experience gathering his essays, he and his agent quickly worked together to amass a "greatest hits," as well as a few essays which Chee had not yet finished. Some the essays "took over a decade to write."

Many of the essays were previously published in magazines, such as "Mr. and Mrs. B" in Apology Magazine and "Girl" in Guernica. The essays address a wide variety of topics and experiences, such as Chee's time at the Iowa Writers' Workshop, working for William F. Buckley Jr., and learning from Annie Dillard. Some essays, like "100 Things About Writing a Novel", are experimental in form. The last essay, "On Becoming an American Writer", was excerpted in The Paris Review shortly after the book's release and was derived from an email Chee wrote to his students in wake of the Iraq War.

== Critical reception ==
Publishers Weekly gave the book a starred review, citing Chee's "marvelously oblique style as an essayist". The New York Times revered the strength of Chee's prose and the subjects which it tackled: "Chee has written a moving and personal tribute to impermanence, a wise and transgressive meditation on a life lived both because of and in spite of America". The Rumpus found the essay collection moving, a reminder of "why we write, but also, why we read, even in these times of never ending distress." NPR called Chee "a very special artist; his writing is lyrical and accessible, whimsical and sad, often all at the same time." Some critics saw the book as an investigation and reflection into the self that animated his prior works, The Queen of the Night and Edinburgh. Many critics noted the unified feeling of the book despite its format. The Washington Independent Review of Books, in particular, stated: "This work calls itself an essay collection. And, yes, each essay stands alone, but they also hum together, ebbing and flowing back and forth through Chee's life ..." The Brooklyn Rail remarked on how the previously published essays had been polished for the book, with the effect that they "form a sort of autobiography themselves."
