= Edinburgh (novel) =

Novel by Alexander Chee

- Author: Alexander Chee
- Language: English
- Genre: Novel
- Publisher: Picador USA
- Publication date: 2001
- Media type: Hardback and paperback
- Pages: 209 pp (hardback edition)
- ISBN: 0-312-30503-6 (paperback edition)
- OCLC: 47666550
- Dewey Decimal: 813/.6 21
- LC Class: PS3603.H44 E35 2002

Edinburgh is a debut novel by author Alexander Chee. It is a coming-of-age story about a young boy who experiences, and eventually triumphs over, the damage inflicted by a child molester.

== Plot ==
In the novel, Aphias "Fee" Zhe, a twelve-year-old Korean American boy growing up in Maine, is selected for membership in a boys' choir along with Peter, who becomes his best friend and first love. Fee and other boys are molested by the choir director Big Eric Gorendt. Fee is afraid to tell, and doesn't want anyone else to tell, for reasons that are deeper than pure embarrassment or fear. When one boy comes out with the secret, all the boys are revealed as victims as well. This novel explores the horrific mental and emotional damage these boys go through and how they cope with this trauma.

== Critical reception ==
Edinburgh won the Michener/Copernicus Prize in fiction, the Asian American Writers Workshop Literary Award, the Lambda Editor's Choice Prize, and was named a Best Book of the Year by Publishers Weekly. The Washington Post wrote, "A coming-of-age novel in the grand Romantic tradition, where passions run high, Cupid stalks Psyche, and love shares the dance floor with death...A lovely, nuanced, never predictable portrait of a creative soul in the throes of becoming."

Alexander Chee was a recipient of a 2003 Whiting Writers' Award.
