= The Incendiaries =

2018 novel by R. O. Kwon

- First edition cover
- Author: R. O. Kwon
- Audio read by: Keong Sim
- Language: English
- Genre: Bildungsroman
- Set in: Noxhurst, New York
- Publisher: Riverhead Books
- Publication date: July 31, 2018
- Publication place: United States
- Media type: Print (Hardcover and Paperback) and e-book
- Pages: 224
- ISBN: 978-0-7352-1389-0
- OCLC: 1101143948
- Dewey Decimal: 813/.6
- LC Class: PS3611.W68 I53 2019

The Incendiaries is a 2018 novel by South Korean–born American author R. O. Kwon, published by Riverhead Books. The novel was inspired by Kwon's own loss of faith in God at the age of 17, and it took her 10 years to finish.

The novel follows a young woman who is indoctrinated into a cult on her campus, as told by three characters: Phoebe Lin, the woman who is recruited, John Leal, the man who recruits her, and Will Kendall, a fellow student who loves Phoebe and struggles to understand her choices.

== Plot ==
Three people meet at Edwards University in Noxhurst, a fictional town in upstate New York: Phoebe Lin, the American daughter of two South Koreans, John Leal, a mysterious half-Korean Edwards drop-out who knows Phoebe's father, and Will Kendall, a poor white Californian who is a former evangelist.

Phoebe grew up as a young piano prodigy but after mastering a challenging piece by the composer Libich and being complimented on it she realizes that her ambition will never match her talent. She abandons her ambition to be a pianist and shortly before graduating high school also loses her mother in a car accident where Phoebe was driving. The double loss causes Phoebe to become a reckless party girl in university where she drinks heavily and is sexually promiscuous with little regard for her own health.

At school she meets Will Kendall, who has recently transferred to the college after a slow crisis of faith caused him to abandon his religion and leave his studies at a religious college. At school Will hides the fact that he is much poorer than his classmates and must work at a restaurant in order to supplement his income and help to send money back home. Will has a crush on Phoebe and the two gradually grow close, with Phoebe eventually confiding in him about her mother's death and Will admitting his relative poverty and difficult home life.

At the same time Phoebe has attracted the attention of the mysterious John Leal, a half-Korean man who knows her father and who is an activist who spent time in a North Korean gulag.

Will manages to obtain several promising positions at school, eventually getting an internship at an investment fund in Beijing. Phoebe, who by this time is his girlfriend, plans to spend the summer with Will, but because of her slipping grades she is forced to spend the summer at school taking remedial courses. During their time apart Will is upset to find she is spending more time with John Leal, who has recruited her into his mysterious group he calls Jejah. When Will returns for the next semester he and Phoebe move in together, but he is surprised to find that she continues to attend Jejah sessions.

To keep an eye on Phoebe, Will also asks to attend Jejah. He is reluctantly allowed in and for a time he, like Phoebe, enjoys the strict regimen that John Leal imposes on his followers. At an anti-abortion rally however he experiences a revelation that Jejah is a cult and taking some sleeping pills to relax himself experiences vivid hallucinations. Rather than take care of him Phoebe sends him back home and spends the weekend with John Leal, causing Will to grow increasingly angry and jealous. As their relationship fractures Will notices that Phoebe has scars and bruises on her back thanks to penance inflected by John Leal. Wanting Phoebe to leave Jejah for good Will proposes to her and then rapes her, finally causing her to leave him and move out of their shared apartment.

A few months later Will learns that several health clinics that provide abortions in and around Noxhurst have been bombed resulting in the deaths of five teenaged girls who were practicing cheer routines in the abandoned parking lot of one of the clinics. Will is convinced John Leal is responsible and tells the dean who notifies the F.B.I. Convinced that Phoebe is innocent Will agrees to help the F.B.I. with their investigation and is surprised to later learn from other Jejah recruits that the bombings were Phoebe's idea. Later still he learns from the F.B.I. that a man saw Phoebe jump off a bridge, ostensibly committing suicide, but Will believes she might have been faking her death as she was a strong swimmer.

After graduation Will moves to Manhattan where he sees Julian, a friend of Phoebe's. When he tries to greet Julian, Julian tells him that Phoebe shared the fact that Will raped her and that he believed Will caused the final mental break that caused her to fully commit to Jejah.

Will continues to believe that Phoebe is alive and will return to him.

== Characters ==
- Phoebe Lin, a South Korean-born American, born Haejin Lin, who is reeling from the double loss of her piano playing and the loss of her mother who died shortly before she entered university.
- John Leal, a half-Korean American who is the son of missionaries. While doing activism work helping North Koreans escape their country to go to China, he was captured and spent time in a North Korean gulag. Upon his release he grows increasingly radical in his methods.
- Will Kendall, a former evangelist who gradually loses faith after his father abandons the family, leaving them in debt and his mother emotionally and financially dependent on him.

== Reception and awards ==
It was named a best book of the year by over 40 publications and organizations, including the Today Show, NPR, BuzzFeed, The Atlantic, PBS Books, Entertainment Weekly, Vulture, and elsewhere. Before the book's release, Kwon was called one of "4 writers to watch" by The New York Times. The Washington Post called it "the most buzzed-about debut of the summer, as it should be."The New Yorker said it is full of "eerie, sombre power". The New York Times Book Review called it "radiant" and "a dark, absorbing story of how first love can be as intoxicating and dangerous as religious fundamentalism." The Guardian called it "a startlingly assured book by an important new writer," and CBC called it "a brilliant examination of the minds of extremist terrorists". The A.V. Club praised the novel for having "a timeless quality" with particular admiration for Kwon's "[s]parkling, deliberate prose". The L.A. Times noted that it had been buzzed about in literary circles long before publication and called it "the rare book that lives up to its pre-publication hype."

The novel is an American Booksellers Association Indie Next #1 Great Read and an American Booksellers Association Indies Introduce Pick. In addition, The Incendiaries was a finalist for the National Book Critics Circle John Leonard Award for Best First Book, Los Angeles Times First Book Prize, and Northern California Independent Booksellers Association Fiction Prize. The book was also nominated for the American Library Association Carnegie Medal and Aspen Prize.

== Television adaptation ==
In September 2022, FilmNation Entertainment and Wishmore Entertainment announced they were developing the book as a limited series. Lisa Randolph will write the screenplay, and Kogonada will direct.
