= R. O. Kwon =

South Korean and American author

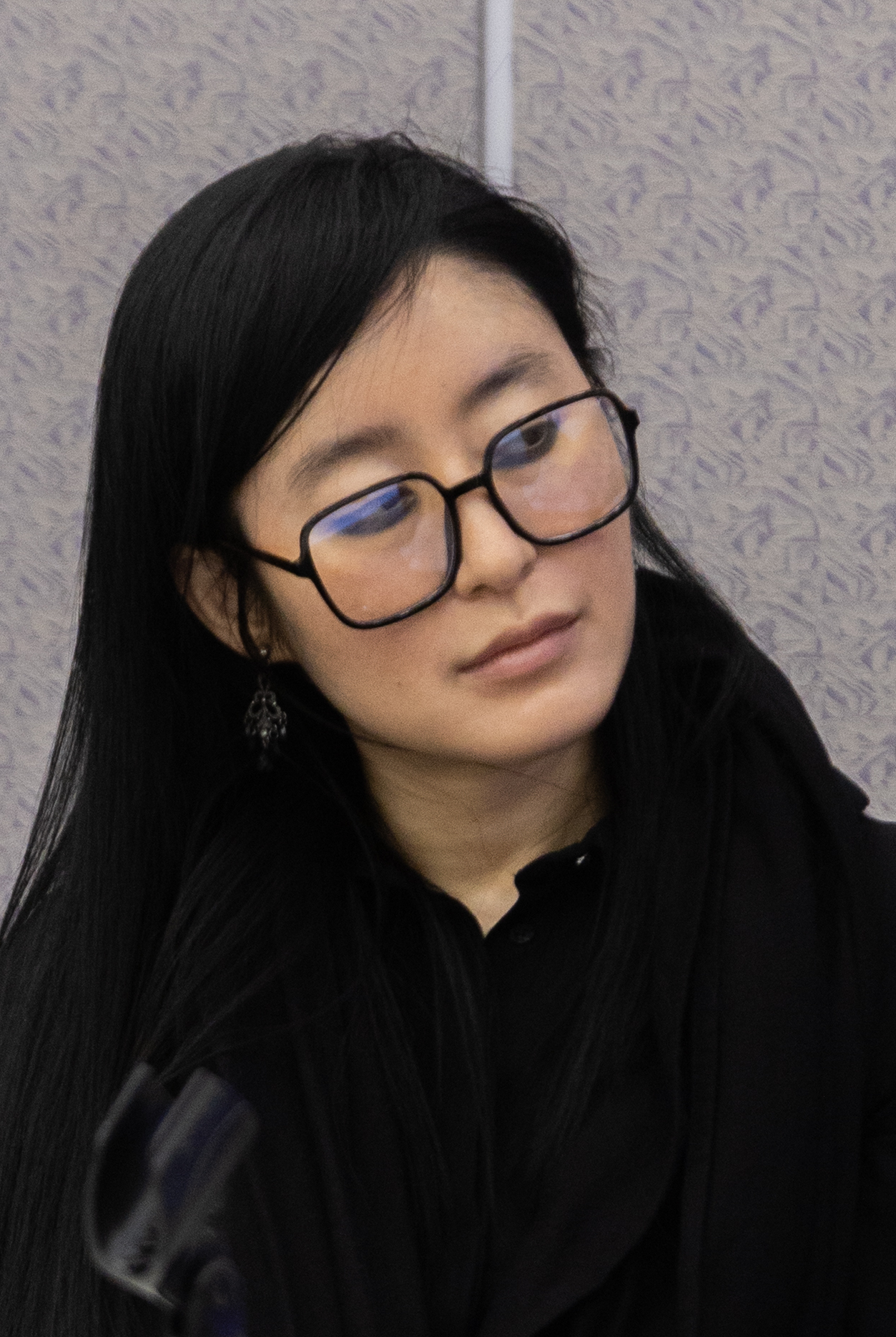
- Kwon at AWP 2025
- Born: Okyong Kwon; Seoul, South Korea
- Education: Yale University (BA); Brooklyn College (MFA)
- Writing career
- Years active: 2017–present
- Notable work: The Incendiaries
- Notable awards: NEA Fellowship (2016)
- Website: ro-kwon.com

- Korean name
- Hangul: 권오경
- RR: Gwon Ogyeong
- MR: Kwŏn Ogyŏng

R.O. Kwon, also known as Reese Okyong Kwon, is a South Korean and American author. In 2018, she published her debut novel, The Incendiaries, with Riverhead Books. Her second novel, Exhibit, was published in 2024.

== Early life ==
Kwon was born in Seoul, South Korea, and moved to Los Angeles, California, with her family when she was three years old. She was raised in a Christian household but at the age of 17 experienced a crisis of faith and stopped believing in God.

She attended Yale University, where she majored in Economics. She has a Master of Fine Arts degree in Creative Writing from Brooklyn College.

== Career ==
Kwon's work has appeared in publications including The New York Times, The Guardian, The Paris Review, BuzzFeed, Vice, New York Magazine's The Cut, and elsewhere. She has received fellowships from the National Endowment for the Arts, Yaddo, and MacDowell.

In 2018, Kwon published her debut novel, The Incendiaries, about a woman who becomes involved with a cult of extremist Christians. The novel was inspired by Kwon's own loss of faith in God, and took 10 years to finish. The Incendiaries was named a best book of the year by more than 40 publications and organizations, including The Today Show, NPR, BuzzFeed, The Atlantic, PBS Books, Entertainment Weekly, Vulture, and elsewhere, and is being translated into seven languages. Before the book's release, Kwon was featured as one of "4 writers to watch" by The New York Times. The Incendiaries is an American Booksellers Association Indie Next #1 Great Read and an American Booksellers Association Indies Introduce Pick. The novel received the Housatonic Book Prize, and was a finalist for the National Book Critics Circle John Leonard Award for Best First Book, the Los Angeles Times First Book Prize, and the Northern California Independent Booksellers Association Fiction Prize. In addition, the book has been nominated for the American Library Association Carnegie Medal and Aspen Prize.

Kink, a nationally bestselling anthology co-edited by Kwon and Garth Greenwell, was released by Simon & Schuster in 2021. The anthology was a New York Times Notable Book of 2021.

"Dynamic and imaginative, Kink ventures into the frontiers of boundary-pushing desires while upholding literary excellence. These fifteen short stories explore love and desire, BDSM, and interests across the sexual spectrum—it is a loud and proud celebration of themes sometimes deemed too taboo for public consumption." —Los Angeles Review of Books

Her second novel, Exhibit, also a national bestseller, was published by Riverhead Books in 2024. Jane Ciabattari at LitHub described the book as "an artfully crafted jewel highlighting the vulnerabilities, strengths, passions and ambitions of three Korean women." The novel won the Jim Duggins Outstanding Mid-Career Novelists' Prize from Lambda Literary in 2025.

== Personal life ==
In November 2018, Kwon revealed that she is bisexual. The initials in her name stand for Reese, her English name, and Okyong, her Korean name. She publishes as R.O. Kwon. Kwon lives in San Francisco, California, and "the long-term plan is to be here until climate change chases us out".

== Awards ==
| Year | Title | Award | Category | Result | Ref. |
|---|---|---|---|---|---|
| 2018 | The Incendiaries | Golden Poppy Book Award | Fiction | Shortlisted | |
| 2018 | The Incendiaries | Los Angeles Times Book Prize | First Fiction | Finalist | |
| 2018 | The Incendiaries | National Book Critics Circle Award | First Book | Finalist | |
| 2019 | The Incendiaries | Andrew Carnegie Medals for Excellence | Fiction | Longlisted | |
| 2019 | The Incendiaries | Aspen Words Literary Prize | — | Longlisted | |
| 2025 | Exhibit | Joyce Carol Oates Literary Prize | — | Longlisted | |
| 2025 | — | Lambda Literary Award | Duggins Prize (Special Award) | Won | |

== Bibliography ==
=== Novels ===
- —— (2018). The Incendiaries (hardcover 1st ed.). Riverhead Books. ISBN 9780735213890.
- —— (2024). Exhibit (hardcover 1st ed.). Riverhead Books. ISBN 9780593190029.

=== Anthologies (edited) ===
- R.O. Kwon; Garth Greenwell, eds. (2021). Kink. Simon & Schuster. ISBN 9781982110215.
