= California Commission on Asian and Pacific Islander Affairs =

The Commission on Asian & Pacific Islander American Affairs advises the Governor of California, the California Legislature and State agencies, departments and commissions on issues relating to the social and economic development, the rights and interests of Asian Pacific Islander American (APIA) communities. The commission also addresses how to respond most effectively to the views, needs and concerns of the State's APIA communities. Members do not receive a salary. This position does not require Senate confirmation.

== Mission ==
The aim of the Commission on Asian and Pacific Islander American Affairs (CAPIAA) is to elevate the political, economic, and social issues of Asians and Pacific Islanders in California by contributing to and strengthening how state government addresses the needs, issues, and concerns of the diverse and complex Asian and Pacific Islander American communities.

== Charge ==
The charge of the California Commission on Asian and Pacific Islander American Affairs is to:

- Advise the Governor and Legislature on how to respond most effectively to views, needs, and concerns of the state's Asian and Pacific Islander American communities.
- Assist the state in being an effective liaison and conducting outreach with Asian and Pacific Islander American communities through information dissemination about Asian and Pacific Islander American communities concerning public and private programs beneficial to their interests.
- Examine issues of access and cultural language sensitivity by state agencies, departments, and commissions.
- Provide assistance to policymakers and state agencies in identifying Asian and Pacific Islander American communities’ needs and issues and develop appropriate responses and programs.
- Educate the public about hate crimes against Asian and Pacific Islander American communities.

== Commissioners ==
Nitasha Sawhney, Chair
She was appointed to the commission in 2005 by Assembly Speaker Fabian Nunez and nominated by Congressman Judy Chu. Sawhney was of the four appointed to the commission in 2010 and will be on the board until Jan. 1, 2014. She was re-appointed to the Commission in 2010 for a four-year term by Assembly Speaker John A. Perez. Sawhney currently serves as chair of the commission. Sawhney is currently the only South Asian member of the commission and is active with multiple community-based organizations locally and nationally. She has received the Spirit in Action Award from an interfaith council in Orange County for her work with raising funds and awareness to aid victims of genocide in Darfur and received the Public Interest Award from the South Asian Bar Association of Southern California's Public Interest Foundation.

Kim-Yen Huynh, Vice Chair
In May 2008, Kim-Yen was appointed by the California Governor Arnold Schwarzenegger as the Commissioner of the Asian and Pacific Islander American Affairs Commission. She has been serving as an executive management for First Vietnamese American Bank, Sanwa Bank, Cathay Bank, and Center Bank since 1980.

Dianne Yamashiro-Omi, Secretary
Yamashiro-Omi joined The California Endowment as a program officer in 2000. On December 19, 2005, Dianne Yamashiro-Omi was appointed as senior program officer for Culturally Competent Health Systems. The California Endowment is a private, statewide health foundation with a mission to build a stronger state by expanding access to affordable, quality health care to underserved communities and improving the overall health of all Californians. Prior to joining TCE, she served as a foundation consultant with numerous organizations including the Levi Strauss Foundation, the Evelyn and Walter Haas Jr. Fund, the Civil Liberties Public Education Fund, the Asian Pacific American Community Fund, and the San Francisco Foundation. Yamashiro-Omi also served as a program officer with the Koret Foundation and the Gap Foundation. Also, she served as executive director, board member and, volunteer for numerous non-profits in the Bay Area.

Catherine 'Ofa Mann, Treasurer
'Catherine 'Ofa Mann lived in Auckland's Glen Eden and Grey Lynn before moving to America in 1996. In 'Ofa Mann was appointed on June 5, 2008, by Governor Arnold Schwarzenegger, along with five other members of the Asian and Pacific Islander American Affairs Commission, representing the Pacific Island community of California. She is believed to be the first Kiwi Pacific Islander to be given such a position. From 1996 to 1998, she was a mental health assistant at the Asian Pacific Community Counseling Center. From 1983 to 1996, Mann served as a computer operator and data entry operator for Farmers Trading Company in New Zealand.

Norman H. Hui, D.D.S., Acting Commissioner
As said in the 2008 Annual Report, Norman H. Hui, a founding member of the commission and its first chair, practices dentistry in the San Francisco Bay Area.

Diane Ujiiye, Acting Commissioner
In week of June 23, 2003 Ujiiye was appointed as a member of the Commission on Asian & Pacific Islander American Affair by Gray Davis. Ujiiye was a principal sponsor for the Commission on API American Affairs. She provided testimony for establishing The commission and is the only appointee form the Health and Human Services field. From 1985 to 1991, she was a Counselor and Prevention Specialist for the Asian American Drug Abuse Program, Incorporated. As Prevention Director, she oversees four programs: Community Prevention, Youth and Family Programs, Indochinese Youth Community Center, and Adolescent Treatment Services.

Andrew Wong

Blong Xiong

Blong Xiong is the first Asian American and first Hmong council member serving on the Fresno City Council, as said in the 2008 Annual Report. Also, Xiong would make history as the first Hmong American in Congress, if elected in November 2012.

Steven Ma
Steven Ma was appointed Commissioner in August 2012. He is currently the President and Founder of ThinkTank Learning. ThinkTank Learning is an educational development company headquartered in Santa Clara, California and was founded by 3 U.C. Berkeley graduates in 2002.

Mimi Song
As stated in the 2010 Annual Report, Ms. Song is CEO of Mimi Song Realty Group, a commercial real estate brokerage firm with offices in Southern California. For more than 20 years, she has been involved with a variety of economic ventures, cultural organizations, philanthropic endeavors, and nonprofit groups, all devoted to bridging cultures and developing leadership in a global economy.
