= Alexander Chee =

American writer (born 1967)

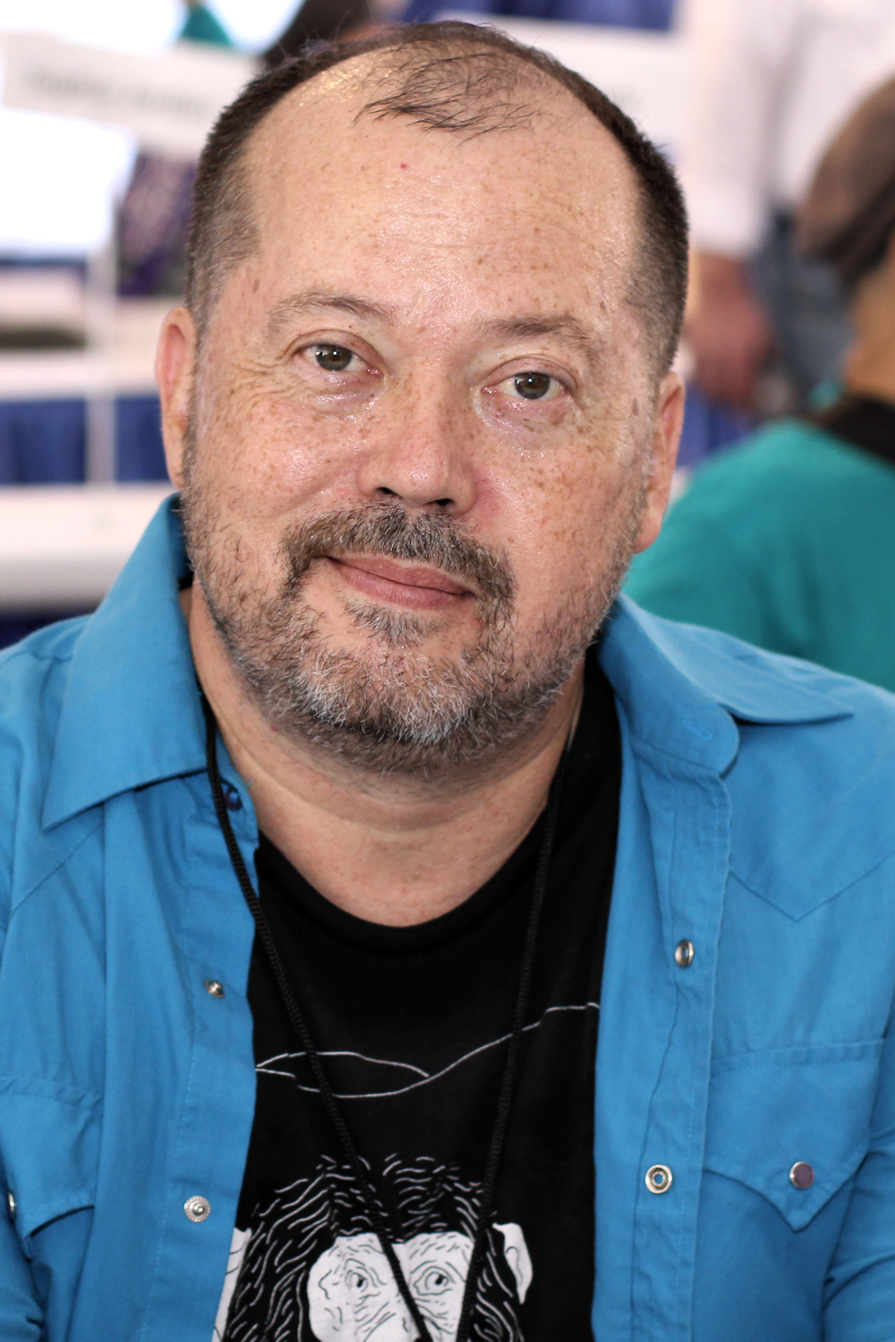
- Chee at the 2018 Texas Book Festival
- Born: August 21, 1967 (age 59); South Kingstown, Rhode Island, United States
- Education: Wesleyan University (BA); Iowa Writers' Workshop, University of Iowa (MFA)
- Occupation: Writer
- Spouse: Dustin Schell
- Writing career
- Notable works: Edinburgh; The Queen of the Night; How to Write an Autobiographical Novel
- Notable awards: Whiting Award (2003); Guggenheim Fellow (2021)
- Website: www.alexanderchee.net

Alexander Chee (born August 21, 1967) is an American fiction writer, poet, journalist and reviewer. His critically acclaimed debut novel, Edinburgh, was awarded the Asian American Writers Workshop Literary Award, the Lambda Editor's Choice Prize, and the Michener/Copernicus Fellowship Prize. In 2003, Out named Chee one of their 100 Most Influential People of the year.

== Early life and education ==
Born in Rhode Island, he spent his childhood in South Korea, Kauai, Truk, Guam and Maine. He attended Wesleyan University and the Iowa Writers' Workshop.

== Career ==
Chee's short fiction appeared in the anthologies Best American Erotica 2007, A Fictional History of the US (With Huge Chunks Missing), Men on Men 2000, His 3, and his personal essays in Out, From Boys To Men, Loss Within Loss, Boys Like Us, The M Word, and The Man I Might Become. His essay "I, Reader" was selected for inclusion in the Notable Essays list of the 2011 edition of the Best American Essays, and his essay "Girl," was included in Best American Essays 2016.

His short stories and essays have also appeared in magazines and journals such as The New York Times Book Review, Tin House, Slate, Guernica, NPR. Chee's poetry has appeared in Barrow Street, LIT, Interview, the James White Review, and XXX Fruit. He has written journalism and reviews for The New York Times, Time Out New York, Out/Look, OutWeek, The Advocate, Out, Bookforum and the San Francisco Review of Books.

He was also the recipient of the 2003 Whiting Award, a 2004 NEA Fellowship, and a 2010 Massachusetts Cultural Council of the Arts Fellowship, as well as residency fellowships at the MacDowell Colony, the Virginia Center for Creative Arts, Civitella Ranieri, and Leidig House. He was a judge for the PEN Open Book Award in 2012 and currently serves on the board of directors of the Authors' Guild of America. He was the recipient of the 2021 Guggenheim Fellowship in Fiction.

Chee was the associate fiction editor of literary magazine The Nervous Breakdown, and is currently a contributing editor at The New Republic, an editor-at-large at VQR and The Lit Hub, and a critic-at-large for Los Angeles Times.

He has taught fiction writing at The New School, Wesleyan, Iowa Writers' Workshop, Columbia University, the University of Texas at Austin, and Princeton University, and has served as a Visiting Writer at Amherst College. In the winter semester 2012/2013 he was Picador Professor for Literature at the University of Leipzig. Chee is currently full professor of creative nonfiction and fiction writing at Dartmouth College in Hanover, New Hampshire.

He wrote an episode of the Netflix limited series East of Eden, based on the novel of the same name by John Steinbeck.

== Bibliography ==
=== Novels ===
- —— (2001). Edinburgh. New York: Picador USA. ISBN 9780312305031.
- —— (2016). The Queen of the Night. Boston: Houghton Mifflin Harcourt. ISBN 9780618663026.

=== Nonfiction ===
- —— (2018). How to Write an Autobiographical Novel. Boston: Mariner Books. ISBN 9781328764522.

=== Anthology appearances ===
- "Memorials". Literature of Tomorrow. Holt, Rinehart, and Winston. 1990. ISBN 978-0-03032-903-6.
- Patrick Merla, ed. (1996). Boys Like Us: Gay Writers Tell Their Coming Out Stories. Avon Books. ISBN 978-0-38097-340-8.
- His(3): Brilliant New Fiction by Gay Writers. Faber & Faber. 1999. ISBN 978-0-57119-963-1.
- "41, 42, 43". The "M" Word: Writers on Same-Sex Marriage. Algonquin Books. 2004. ISBN 978-1-56512-454-7.
- "Dick". From Boys to Men: Gay Men Write About Growing Up. Da Capo Press. 2006. ISBN 978-0-78671-632-6.
- "Little Green Men". Sword Stone Table: Old Legends, New Voices. Vintage. 2021. ISBN 978-0-59308-189-1.
- "Best Friendster Date Ever". Kink. Simon & Schuster. 2021. ISBN 978-1-9821-1021-5.

=== Essays and stories ===
- "Portrait of My Father". Granta. March 12, 2009.
- "Go Away". The Morning News. August 13, 2012.
- "Mr. and Mrs. B". Apology Magazine. 3. Winter 2014.
- "Girl". Guernica: A Magazine of Art and Politics. March 16, 2015.
- "What My Korean Father Taught Me About Defending Myself in America". GQ. May 14, 2021.

== Filmography ==
=== Film appearances ===
- Interview in Sex Is... (1993), Directed by Marc Huestis, as himself

=== Podcast appearances ===
- LGBTQ&A, "Alexander Chee: On Becoming An American Writer," April 23, 2018

=== Television ===
- East of Eden (2026; wrote 1 episode)
