= Garth Greenwell =

American novelist, poet, literary critic, and educator

- Born: March 19, 1978 (age 48); Louisville, Kentucky, U.S.
- Education: State University of New York at Purchase (BA); Washington University in St. Louis (MFA); Harvard University (MA); Iowa Writers' Workshop (MFA)
- Occupation: Novelist
- Known for: What Belongs to You; Cleanness; Small Rain
- Spouse: Luis Muñoz
- Writing career
- Notable awards: Guggenheim Fellow (2020); PEN/Faulkner Award (2025)
- Website: www.garthgreenwell.com

Garth Greenwell (born March 19, 1978) is an American novelist, literary critic, and educator. He has published the novels What Belongs to You (2016), which won the British Book Award for Debut of the Year; Cleanness (2020); and Small Rain (2024), which won the PEN/Faulkner Award for Fiction. He has also published the novella Mitko (2011), as well as stories and criticism in The Paris Review, A Public Space, The Yale Review, The New Yorker and The Atlantic.

Among other prizes, he was a finalist for the 2017 Los Angeles Times Book Prize, the 2016 James Tait Black Memorial Prize, and the 2017 Lambda Literary Award. He was a 2020 Guggenheim Fellow and recipient of the 2021 Vursell Award for prose style from the American Academy of Arts and Letters.

== Early life and education ==
Garth Greenwell was born in Louisville, Kentucky. He attended duPont Manual High School in Louisville and graduated from Interlochen Arts Academy in Interlochen, Michigan in 1996. He studied voice at the Eastman School of Music before transferring to the State University of New York at Purchase, where he earned a BA in Literature with a minor in Lesbian and Gay Studies in 2001.

He later received an MFA in poetry from Washington University in St. Louis and an MA in English and American Literature from Harvard University, where he also spent three years doing Ph.D. coursework. In 2015, Greenwell received an MFA in fiction from the Iowa Writers' Workshop at the University of Iowa.

== Career ==
Early in his career, Greenwell taught English at Greenhills School, a private high school in Ann Arbor, Michigan, and at the American College of Sofia in Bulgaria; the oldest American educational institution outside the US. His frequent book reviews in the literary journal West Branch transitioned into a yearly column called "To a Green Thought: Garth Greenwell on Poetry." In 2013, Greenwell returned to the United States after living in Bulgaria to attend the Iowa Writers' Workshop as an Arts Fellow.

For his poetry, he received the Grolier Prize, the Rella Lossy Award, an award from the Dorothy Sargent Rosenberg Foundation, and the Bechtel Prize from the Teachers & Writers Collaborative. He was the 2008 John Atherton Scholar for Poetry at the Bread Loaf Writers' Conference. Greenwell's first novella, Mitko, won the Miami University Press Novella Prize and was a finalist for the Edmund White Award as well as the Lambda Literary Award for Gay Debut Fiction.

His debut novel, What Belongs to You, was called the "first great novel of 2016" by Publishers Weekly. The book follows an American teacher who meets a charismatic young sex-worker and becomes ensnared in a relationship of mutual predation and romance. It won the British Book Award for Debut of the Year, was longlisted for the National Book Award, and was shortlisted for the PEN/Faulkner Award for Fiction, among several other prizes.

Greenwell's second novel, Cleanness, was published in January 2020 and was well received by critics. It was a New York Times Notable Book and chosen by Dwight Garner as one of the Top Ten Books of the Year, as well as named a Best Book of the Year by over 30 Publications. Longlisted for the Prix Sade, the Joyce Carol Oates Literary Prize, and the Gordon Burn Prize, the book showcases the same American teacher from Greenwell's debut novel, What Belongs to You, as he navigates a life transformed by the discovery and loss of love.

In 2024, Greenwell published his third novel, Small Rain, which won the PEN/Faulkner Award. It was longlisted for the National Book Critics Circle Award for Fiction, and was named a Best Book of the Year by The New Yorker, The Washington Post, NPR, BBC, and many other publications. It follows the same narrator from Greenwell's previous two books, who undergoes a health crisis and is hospitalized in the ICU. Confined to bed, the narrator is plunged into the dysfunctional American healthcare system during the COVID-19 pandemic. In The Chicago Tribune, John Warner called the book "One of the most profound reading experiences I've ever had."

Greenwell is also active as a critic. His essay "A Moral Education", on Philip Roth's Sabbath's Theater, was widely discussed, receiving "a rapturous reception," according to The Chronicle of Higher Education. He has also written on Andrew Holleran, Raven Leilani, Pedro Lemebel, and Georgi Gospodinov, among others. Since November 2022 he has written essays about visual art, film, music, and literature for the Substack newsletter To a Green Thought. His essay on Jonathan Glazer's The Zone of Interest, first published in To a Green Thought, was reprinted in The Point.

Greenwell previously taught at New York University, where he was the Distinguished Writer in Residence for three years. He currently teaches for the Iowa Writers' Workshop. He frequently offers classes on close reading and craft online.

== Awards and recognition ==
=== Literary prizes ===
Year	Title	Award	Category	Result	Ref.
2010	Mitko	Miami University Press Novella Prize	Novella	Won	
2012	Mitko	Edmund White Award	Debut Fiction	Finalist	
2012	Mitko	Lambda Literary Awards	Debut Fiction	Finalist	
2016	What Belongs to You	Center for Fiction First Novel Prize	—	Shortlisted	
2016	What Belongs to You	Green Carnation Prize	—	Shortlisted	
2016	What Belongs to You	James Tait Black Memorial Prize	Fiction	Shortlisted	
2016	What Belongs to You	National Book Award	Fiction	Longlisted	
2017	What Belongs to You	British Book Awards	Debut of the Year	Won	
2017	What Belongs to You	Lambda Literary Awards	Gay Fiction	Finalist	
2017	What Belongs to You	Los Angeles Times Book Prize	Fiction	Finalist	
2017	What Belongs to You	PEN/Faulkner Award for Fiction	—	Finalist	
2018	What Belongs to You	International Dublin Literary Award	—	Longlisted	
2020	Cleanness	Gordon Burn Prize	—	Longlisted	
2020	Cleanness	Lambda Literary Awards	Gay Fiction	Finalist	
2020	Cleanness	L.D. and LaVerne Harrell Clark Fiction Prize	—	Longlisted	
2021	Cleanness	Le Prix Sade	—	Longlisted	
2024	Small Rain	National Book Critics Circle Award	Fiction	Longlisted	
2025	Small Rain	PEN/Faulkner Award for Fiction	—	Won	
2025	Small Rain	PEN Oakland/Josephine Miles Literary Award	—	Won	

=== Other things ===
Year	Awards
2021	Harold D. Vursell Memorial Prize, for distinguished prose style, The American Academy of Arts and Letters
2020	Guggenheim Fellowship, John Simon Guggenheim Memorial Foundation; Monroe K Spears Prize for best essay published in 2020, The Sewanee Review
2016	OUT 100 Honoree, Out Magazine
2010	Bechtel Prize for writing on literary arts education, selected by Phillip Lopate, Teachers & Writers Collaborative, 2010
2008	Dorothy Sargent Rosenberg Poetry Prize, Dorothy Sargent Rosenberg Foundation
2001	Rella Lossy Poetry Award, Poetry Center & American Poetry Archive, SFSU

== Bibliography ==
=== Novels ===
- —— (2016). What Belongs to You (hardcover 1st ed.). New York: Farrar, Straus and Giroux. ISBN 9780374288228.
- —— (2020). Cleanness (hardcover 1st ed.). New York: Farrar, Straus and Giroux. ISBN 9780374124588.
- —— (2024). Small Rain (hardcover 1st ed.). New York: Farrar, Straus and Giroux. ISBN 9780374279547.

=== Anthologies (edited) ===
- Kink, co-edited with R. O. Kwon. Simon & Schuster. 2021.

=== Short fiction ===
Year	Title (Note: Short stories unless otherwise noted.)	First published	Reprinted/collected	Notes
2011	Mitko	Mitko. Miami University Press. 2011.		Novella
2014	Gospodar	"Gospodar". The Paris Review, Vol. 209. 2014.		
2017	An Evening Out	Greenwell, Garth (August 21, 2017). "An Evening Out". The New Yorker. Vol. 93, no. 24. pp. 62–69.		
2018	The Frog King	"The Frog King". The New Yorker. Vol. 94, no. 42. November 26, 2018. pp. 74–81.		
2019	Harbor	"Harbor". The New Yorker. September 16, 2019.		

=== Essays and reporting ===
- To a Green Thought: A newsletter on art and culture
- On Edmund White's Nocturnes for the King of Naples, The New Yorker, 28 May 2024
- On Andrew Holleran's Dancer from the Dance, The Yale Review, 9 July 2024
- On Philip Roth's Sabbath's Theater, The Yale Review, 10 Dec. 2024
- On Andrew Holleran's Kingdom of Sand, The New Yorker, 6 June 2022
- On a Sentence by Raven Leilani, The Sewanee Review, Spring 2022
- On Ceirra Evans, The New Yorker, 15 Feb. 2022
- On John Brooks, The New Yorker, 14 Sept. 2021
- Making Meaning: On Relevance in Art, Harper's Magazine, 15 Oct. 2020
- On Writing Sex, The Guardian, May 2020
- On Mark McKnight, GQ, 29 Sept. 2020,
- On Caleb Crain's Overthrow, The New Yorker, 28 Aug. 2019,
- "Get out of town : 'The end of Eddy', a novel of class and violence in the provinces". The Critics. Books. The New Yorker. 93 (12): 62–65. May 8, 2017.

== Adaptations ==
What Belongs to You was adapted as a 2021 opera by composer/librettist David T. Little. The premiere production was by Mark Morris, starring Karim Sulayman as the narrator, and conducted by Alan Pierson.
