= Steven Ma (API Commissioner) =

Taiwanese-American businessman (born 1978)

- Born: June 16, 1978 (age 48); Taiwan
- Education: University of California, Berkeley (BS)
- Occupations: NexTier Nexus, Managing Partner; Pegasus California School, CEO; CHT Education, Managing Partner

Chinese name
- Simplified Chinese: 马振翼
Transcriptions
Standard Mandarin
- Hanyu Pinyin: Ma Zhen Yi

Steven Ma (born June 16, 1978) is a Taiwanese-born American businessman who served as secretary of the California Commission on Asian and Pacific Islander Affairs, the first International Education Liaison for California Department of Education and many other State appointed position.

== Life and career ==
Steven Ma was born in Taiwan and immigrated with his family to Oakland, California, at age 11. His family moved a few years later to Lockeford, California, where they raised zinfandel grapes on a small vineyard. Ma attended University of California Berkeley and has a B.S. in math and physics. After college he taught math at Castlemont High School, and tutored math, which led him to believe in the need for additional extra educational resources for students. In 2002 he started ThinkTank Learning to fill the gap by providing test prep services.

In early 2020, ThinkTank Learning ceased operations due to the global pandemic (COVID-19), and in April 2020, it filed for Chapter 7 bankruptcy. Ma has been a leader in Asian American issues in the bay area through his work with the Hep B Free Coalition, the Chinese American Voter Education Committee, the Asian American Education Media Foundation and the San Francisco Ethnic Dance Festival. In 2012 he was appointed by ASM Speaker John Perez to the California Commission on Asian & Pacific Islander American Affairs. Ma has been interviewed by media outlets including Bloomberg Businessweek, Bloomberg TV, and CBS This Morning. In 2017, Ma was appointed as a member of UC Regents Selection Advisory Committee, and then as the first Director of the International Education Liaison, California Department of Education.

== Leadership in API community ==
In 2012, Ma was appointed to the California Commission on Asian & Pacific Islander American Affairs where he currently serves as secretary. The APIA advises the governor of California, the California Legislature and State agencies, departments and commissions on issues relating to the social and economic development, the rights and interests of Asian Pacific Islander American (APIA) communities. Steven Currently serves as the Secretary of the commission.

Prior to this appointment, Ma served as chairman of the Education Committee of the International Leadership Foundation, which seeks to develop young leaders in the United States, Asia, and other Pacific-rim countries in the fields of public service, entrepreneurship and the international arena.

== Awards ==
Steven Ma has been recognized for by the California State Legislature and the Cities of Sunnyvale, Saratoga, San Jose, Cupertino. In 2010, Steven was recognized as one of China's Top 10 Economic Talents and given a special recognition at the 7th Annual “Greater China Economic Excellence Awards” in Beijing. He was the 2013 “Partner of the Year”’ from the SF Hep B Free Coalition and was honored by the Chinese American Voter Education Committee for his work with youth in 2014 In 2015, he was recognized at the Oakland Military Institute (OMI) by students, faculty, and staff for ThinkTank Learning’s efforts to raise the students’ SAT scores.

== Philanthropic activities ==
Ma's philanthropic activities include creating the Asian American Education Media Foundation, a non-profit dedicated to providing Asian Pacific Islanders resources and opportunities in education; working with students at the Oakland Military Institute to raise their test scores; eradicating Hepatitis B, a disease that disproportionately affects the Asian population around the world. Ma received "Partner of the Year" from the SF Hep B Free Coalition for his innovative public/private partnership efforts); and supports the New Hope Foundation China: caring for abandoned babies who are at-risk or require special medical treatment.
