= Pam Rosenthal =

American romance author

- Born: Brooklyn, New York, United States
- Occupation: Novelist
- Writing career
- Pen name: Molly Weatherfield
- Language: English
- Genre: Erotic historical romance novels
- Website: pamrosenthal.com/index.php

Pam Rosenthal is a Brooklyn-born author of erotic historical romance novels. Under the pseudonym Molly Weatherfield, she has written erotic novels in the BDSM genre ("bondage, domination and sadomasochism").

She and her husband Michael Rosenthal were part owners of the Modern Times bookstore in San Francisco.

== Biography ==
=== Writer ===
Rosenthal's first Weatherfield novel Carrie's Story made number 12 on Playboy.com's list of the 25 Sexiest Novels Ever Written. The novel has gone through sixteen printings since its publication in 1995. Carrie's Story and its sequel Safe Word (named for the BDSM term safeword) are influenced by the erotic classic Story of O.

=== Critic and essayist ===
Like Jennifer Crusie, Rosenthal takes a scholarly interest in the romance genre. Rosenthal has reviewed literary biography and fiction for Salon and other newspapers and magazines. In 2010 Rosenthal participated in an academic conference held in Brussels by the International Association for the Study of Popular Romance. Diverging from much of the current academic and scholarly production on romance, her critical work does not primarily focus on vindicating the genre and its values (a project furthered in recent years by, among others, Crusie, Jayne Ann Krentz, Mary Bly, Sarah MacLean and Jen Prokop, Pamela Regis, Maya Rodale, Candy Tan and Sarah Wendell, and others), but rather pursues a formal inquiry, based in both her own experience with genre conventions and the hermeneutic practices of queer theory adapted to the cultural studies tradition usually traced to Raymond Williams.

== Themes ==
While satisfying the requirements of the romance genre, Rosenthal's work also exhibits some features typical of literary novels but infrequently found in genre romance, including the development of symbolic themes. Her approximately "Regency-set" historical romances are unusual in the genre for their relatively unvarnished depiction of the period's inequalities, violence and physical hardships. The genre generally requires softening the depiction of the life of servants and the working class, but Rosenthal's work demonstrates an awareness of the elitism of the genre's formulae, and develops the labouring class figures in her world into compelling secondary characters.

== Books ==
As Molly Weatherfield:

- Carrie's Story 1995
- Safe Word 1998

As Pam Rosenthal:

- Almost a Gentleman 2003
- The Bookseller's Daughter 2004
- The Slightest Provocation 2006
- The Edge of Impropriety 2008
