= Saints & Sinners LGBTQ+ Literary Festival =

Annual literary festival in New Orleans, U.S.

- Saints & Sinners LGBTQ+ Literary Festival Logo
- Genre: LGBTQ+ Literature
- Dates: 2003- present
- Locations: French Quarter, New Orleans, Louisiana, U.S.
- Website: www.sasfest.org

Saints and Sinners LGBTQ+ Literary Festival is an alternative literary festival specializing in LGBTQ+ literature. It is held in various locations around the French Quarter neighborhood in the city of New Orleans, Louisiana, each March. The event is coordinated by the Tennessee Williams & New Orleans Literary Festival.

== Overview ==
Founded by Paul J. Willis in 2003 as a way to promote information about HIV and AIDS in literature, Saints and Sinners has since expanded to include works of fiction and nonfiction relating to gay, lesbian, bisexual, and transgender issues. The Festival provides a forum for the dissemination of ideas and promotes those writers and publishers within the community who have successfully brought the issues of LGBTQ+ individuals to the forefront. Workshops and discussion panels are hosted where authors can discuss their works for future and emerging authors as well as fans.

The festival launched the Jim Duggins Outstanding Mid-Career Novelists' Prize, a prize to honor a noted LGBTQ+ writer's body of work, in 2007. The award was subsequently taken over by the Lambda Literary Awards program in 2011.

Past participants in the Saints and Sinners Literary Festival include Dorothy Allison, Poppy Z. Brite, Patrick Califia, 1999 Pulitzer Prize-winner Michael Cunningham, 2008 National Book Award winner Mark Doty, Amie M. Evans, Jewelle Gomez, Emanuel Xavier, Greg Herren, William J. Mann, Jeff Mann, Martin Pousson, Radclyffe, Michelle Tea, and Scissor Sisters front man Jake Shears, among many others.

Saints and Sinners benefits the NO/AIDS Task Force and was designed as an innovative way to reach the community with information about HIV/AIDS, particularly the development of prevention messages via the writers, thinkers, and spokespeople of the LGBTQ+ community. Participants provide support to the literary community, the NO/AIDS Task Force, and the economy of the City of New Orleans.

The Tennessee Williams & New Orleans Literary Festival coordinates the event and provides the staff and resources to make the Saints and Sinners LGBTQ+ Literary Festival possible. In addition, The Haworth Press Inc. serves as a major sponsor of Saints and Sinners.

In 2020, this festival went on hiatus. In 2021 the festival was virtual. In 2022 the festival resumed fully in-person.
