= Zelda Lockhart =

African-American writer, speaker, teacher and researcher

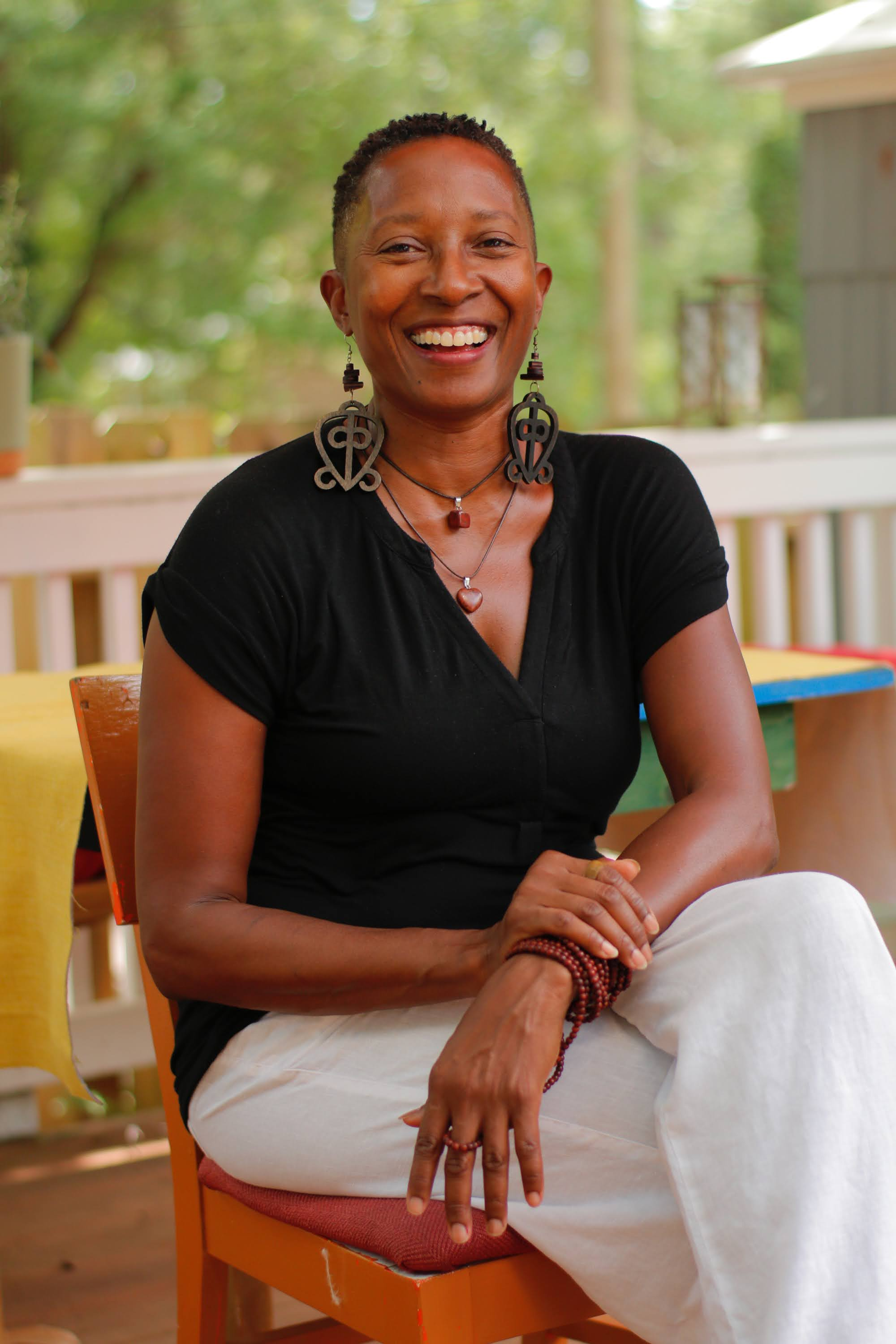

Zelda Lockhart is a contemporary African-American writer, speaker, teacher and researcher. Her latest novel Trinity was published in July 2023. She is the director of LaVenson Press and Her Story Garden Studios. Her recent books include Diamond Doris: The True Story of the World’s Most Notorious Jewel Thief by Doris Payne with Zelda Lockhart (2019), and 20/20: A Living & Learning poetry collection (2017). She is the author of three novels: Fifth Born (2003), Cold Running Creek (2006), and Fifth Born II: The Hundredth Turtle (2010). Her first novel was published to critical acclaim and was a finalist for an award—for a debut novel—from the Zora Neale Hurston/Richard Wright Legacy Foundation. Her novels emphasize the struggles, sexual trauma, and triumphs of African and Native American women historically and contemporarily. Her research focuses on inquiries into intergenerational healing and the ways creating personal experience-based literature while consuming personal experience-based literature has the potential to be emotionally, psychologically, and socially transformative for individuals. Areas of interest are Black women and girls, Native populations, people of color, LGBT individuals and financially disenfranchised people. In her position as director of LaVenson Press and Her Story Garden Studios, Lockhart seeks to create a space where women can "self-define through writing and publishing." She is currently associate professor of Creative Writing and African American Literature at North Carolina Central University.

== Education ==
Lockhart holds a PhD in expressive therapies from Lesley University, a MA in English literature with creative writing emphasis from Old Dominion University, a BA in English from Norfolk State University, and a Certificate in Film Studies from New York Film Academy.

== Awards and praise ==
Lockhart was named the 2010 Piedmont Laureate. She is a 2012 Distinguished Alumna of Old Dominion University.

Lockhart's first novel, Fifth Running (2003), was a 2002 Barnes & Noble Discovery selection and a finalist for the Zora Neale Hurston/Richard Wright Legacy Foundation's award for debut fiction.

Lockhart's Cold Running Creek won the Black Caucus of the American Library Association's Honor Book award for fiction in 2008. Fifth Born II was a 2011 Lambda Literary Award Finalist for lesbian fiction. She is author of The Soul of the Full-Length Manuscript: Turning Life's Wounds Into the Gift of Literary Fiction, Memoir, or Poetry.

== See also ==
- Jaki Shelton Green - 1st Piedmont Laureate (2008)
