= Western Motel =

1957 painting by Edward Hopper

- Year: 1957
- Medium: oil paint, canvas
- Dimensions: 76.8 cm (30.2 in) × 127.3 cm (50.1 in)
- Location: Yale University Art Gallery
- Accession: 1961.18.32

Western Motel is a 1957 oil on canvas painting by the American artist Edward Hopper. The work depicts a sunlit motel room with a woman sitting on a bed, looking to her right. It is a composite interior scene, synthesized from motels in El Paso, Texas, that Hopper visited, and the Huntington Hartford Foundation art colony in Los Angeles, where he held a six-month artist's residency. Both the Kunsthalle Wien in Austria and the Virginia Museum of Fine Arts in the United States have hosted artistic 3D reconstructions of the painting. The work is currently held by the Yale University Art Gallery.

== Background ==
Edward Hopper worked as a commercial artist in the 1920s for the hospitality industry illustrating hotel magazines. From the 1930s until the 1960s, Hopper and his wife Josephine Hopper (Jo) enjoyed traveling on long road trips to Mexico and across the United States by car, making great use of motels and hotels along the way. Hopper used these themes in his work, with many paintings making use of artistic and interpretive renderings and idealized depictions of the original places where they stayed. Two notable works from this time on this theme include Room in New York (1932) and Hotel Lobby (1943).

In July 1956, the Huntington Hartford Foundation awarded Hopper $1000 ($11,842 in 2025) and a six-month residence at their upper Rustic Canyon art colony near Pacific Palisades in California. Hopper was not a fan of California nor of art colonies, but after Jo discovered that people had nothing but good things to say about Rustic Canyon, she convinced Edward to go. They left their summer home on Cape Cod in October, with plans to drive a southwesterly route, presumably at some time in November. A Time magazine cover story on Hopper from December 1956, indicated that they drove a 1954 green and white Buick Century sedan to California, arriving in Los Angeles on December 9. Finding the lodgings comfortable and the food beyond reproach, they remained for the full six months. During their visit, they stayed in accommodations designed by Lloyd Wright, the son of Frank Lloyd Wright.

== Development ==
Hopper began two works during this time, an oil painting titled Western Motel and a watercolor titled California Hills. He initially made a charcoal and graphite study for Western Motel, informally referred to as a Sketch of Hotel, that originally featured two windows and two figures seated in a hotel lobby-like environment. The initial sketch changed in the painting, with the window on the left becoming a wall, the two figures reduced to one, a woman sitting on a bed, with the hotel lobby transformed into a bedroom.

Hopper completed the painting in either February or March 1957. In her notes for the work, Jo recalls that the large window depicted in the painting was similar to the Wright-designed window in their room that looked out over Rustic Canyon. She described the scene as "Deluxe green motel room, mahogany bed, pink cover, dark red chair with blue robe", with the woman as a "haughty blond in dark red, her Buick outside window green." The Hoppers left Rustic Canyon for Cape Cod on June 6, with Edward, now 74 years old, driving the 3,000 mile journey. They arrived at home in South Truro, Massachusetts, on June 19. Hopper finished California Hills in South Truro that summer.

== Description ==
A blonde woman wearing a sleeveless, V-neck burgundy dress sits on the edge of a fully made bed with a mahogany-colored frame in a sparsely furnished green motel room. She looks toward the viewer, but her eyes are turned to her right. Near the end of her gaze, two fully packed suitcases sit in the lower left-hand corner. Behind the woman, to her left, next to the bed, is a nightstand with a gooseneck lamp and a small clock. Directly across from the bed on the right is a red chair with a blue sweater draped across it near the front door of the room. The chair, the bed, the bedspread, and the woman's dress are all in matching red tones. Daylight enters the room through large plate-glass windows. The hood of a green Buick is visible through the window, with the low, rounded hills of a Southwestern mesa in shadow on the horizon. The painting is signed "Edward Hopper" in the lower right corner.

== Analysis ==
Art historian Leo G. Mazow of the Virginia Museum of Fine Arts believes that the original hotel stay depicted in the painting may derive from the Hopper's 1952 trip to El Paso, Texas, at the Weseman Motor Court from December 15–22. Mazow matched a partial description of the painting from Jo's 1952 diary entry about accommodations in the area. Weseman was then located near U.S. Route 80 in Texas before the Interstate Highway System replaced it. This area contained several motor courts, one of which was named "Western Motel", which originally opened in 1950. A newspaper account of the construction of the motel describes the interior room with a bed made from limed oak, an easy chair, and other furnishings, with pastel color mixed directly into the plaster walls.

The positioning of the scene has been compared to several of Hopper's other paintings, including Compartment C and New York Movie. Yale curator Mark D. Mitchell describes the work as if it were a scene from a film storyboard. Art critic Mark Strand argues that this is the only Hopper painting where the subject stares directly at the viewer. Mazow disputes this idea, noting that a close examination of the painting shows that the eyes of the woman are turned to her right, looking to the left of the viewer, not straight at them.

== Provenance ==
Art collector Stephen Carlton Clark, heir to the Singer sewing machine company through his grandfather Edward Cabot Clark, and a Hopper collector throughout the 1950s, purchased Western Motel in 1957 from the Rehn Gallery in New York. Upon his death, it was bequeathed to the Yale University Art Gallery in 1961. Yale later obtained Hopper's original study for the painting in 2009.

== Exhibitions ==
View through the glass window at the Virginia Museum of Fine Arts

The painting was first featured in an Edward Hopper retrospective exhibition at the Whitney Museum of American Art from September to November 1964. Western Motel first received widespread media attention when it appeared at the New York Painting and Sculpture: 1940–1970 centennial exhibition sponsored by Xerox at the Metropolitan Museum of Art from October 1969 to February 1970. The exhibition was said to have been "the largest showing of contemporary United States art ever brought together" up to that point.

Hopper's Western Motel was reconstructed in three-dimensional form in at least two exhibitions: by Austrian artist Gustav Deutsch in 2008 at the Kunsthalle Wien as a set-based spatial reconstruction, and in 2019 by designer S. Ryan Schmidt as a functional, habitable environment at the Virginia Museum of Fine Arts. Under director Gerald Matt, the Kunsthalle held the Western Motel: Edward Hopper and Contemporary Art exhibition in Vienna, Austria. It hosted American and European artists who were influenced by Hopper. Deutsch recreated Hopper's work as a film set installation titled "Wednesday, 28th of August, 1957, 6 p.m., Pacific Palisades". Visitors could enter the set and interact with it, with a video camera showing them sitting on the bed in place of Hopper's female figure. Deutsch later incorporated this installation into his film Shirley: Visions of Reality (2013), a live-action tableau that recreates 13 paintings by Hopper in a unified narrative, including Western Motel.

The 2019 exhibition of Edward Hopper and the American Hotel at the Virginia Museum of Fine Arts, curated by Leo G. Mazow and Sarah G. Powers, also recreated the painting, this time as a functional hotel room that guests could rent and sleep in on an overnight basis. Designer S. Ryan Schmidt used framing projectors adjusted for color temperature to mimic the natural sunlight as it appears in Hopper's painting, while lighting the background with RGB wash fixtures. A glass window allowed visitors to the exhibition to view the room. Hotel rates ranged from $150–500 per night and were sold as part of a package called "The Hopper Hotel Experience".

== See also ==
- List of works by Edward Hopper
