= Office at Night =

1940 painting by Edward Hopper

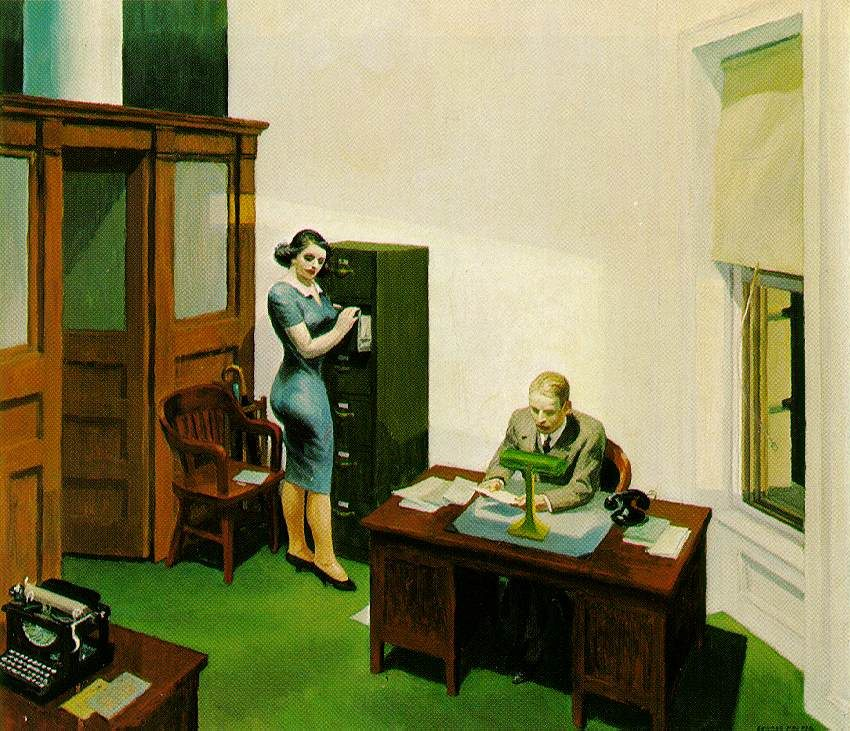
- Artist: Edward Hopper
- Year: 1940
- Medium: oil paint, canvas
- Dimensions: 56.4 cm (22.2 in) × 63.8 cm (25.1 in)
- Accession: 1948.21

Office at Night is a 1940 oil-on-canvas painting by the American realist painter Edward Hopper. It is owned by the Walker Art Center in Minneapolis, Minnesota, which purchased it in 1948.

The painting depicts an office occupied by a young woman in a short-sleeved blue dress, standing at an open file cabinet, and a man of middle age, dressed in a three-piece suit, seated behind a desk. The nature of the office is not definitively clear, as it could represent the workspace of a lawyer, an accountant, or a small business.

== History ==
=== Inspiration and creation ===
In late December 1939 and early January 1940, Edward Hopper went through a creative dry spell. During this time, according to entries in the diary kept by his wife Josephine ("Jo"), he occupied himself by reading a book by the French poet and essayist, Paul Valéry.

On January 25, at Jo's insistence, Edward and Jo attended an exhibition of Italian masters at the Museum of Modern Art. Jo's diary records that their attention was drawn, in particular, to Botticelli's 15th century The Birth of Venus, which she had seen before their marriage at its home in the Uffizi. Edward had, before this time, only ever seen photographs of the painting. She enthused about the painting, while Edward dismissed it as "only another pretty girl picture"—a dismissive characterization that causes his biographer, Gail Levin, to conclude that this comment betrayed "some deeper stir."

The next evening, Edward declared (as Levin puts it) "that he needed to go out to 'meditate' a new picture". His journey around town seems to have included a trip on the elevated train. A day after this, on January 27, he made another trip, to purchase canvas, indicating that he had conceived his new painting and would soon be ready to begin. Jo's diary for this date notes that "he has a black and white drawing of a man at a desk in an office & a girl to left side of room & an effect of lighting."

Several sketches followed as Hopper adjusted the image on paper to more closely match his vision. As was his practice, Jo served as his model for the female figure. Her February 1 diary entry records,

E. has his new picture drawn in charcoal. He is doing things with no end of preparation—had 2 brightly finished crayon sketches. Seems to seek delays for beginning a canvas. It's a business office with older man at his desk & a secretary, female fishing in a filing cabinet. I'm to pose for the same tonight in a tight skirt—short to show legs. Nice that I have good legs & up & coming stockings.

Each day, Edward worked on the painting "until it is almost pitch dark." By February 19 the canvas had progressed to the point that Jo observed, "Each day I don't see how E. can add another stroke"—but also that his changes were making "this picture…more palpable—not fussy ... reduced to essentials ... so realized."

On February 22, the finished painting was taken to a gallery, where a variety of titles were suggested. The gallery-owner's assistant suggested: "Cordially Yours; Room 1506." Hopper himself suggested "Time and Half for Over Time, Etc." Further proposed names, derived from these ones, were recorded a few days later by Jo in her and Edward's journal of his paintings.

=== Notes on the painting from Hopper's journal ===
Starting shortly after their marriage in 1924, Edward and Jo kept a journal in which he would, using a pencil, make a sketch-drawing of each of his paintings, along with a precise description of certain technical details. Jo Hopper would then add additional information in which the themes of the painting are, to some degree, illuminated.

A review of the page on which Office at Night is entered contains the following notes about the painting, in Jo's handwriting:

Office at Night. 22x25. "Confidentially Yours". "Room 1005".

Feb 22, 1940.

White walls, electric light from ceiling, from desk lamp (green cover) & from light outside window. Green floor (dark green), mahogany furniture, blue blotter on desk, green metal filing cabinet. Brown wood partitions with pebbled glass panes. [illegible] window shade. Outside window edge of masonry putty color. Man in grey coat, blond hair. "Shirley" in red dress, white collar, flesh stockings black pumps & black hair & plenty of lipstick. Figures stand out in space, not fastened to background.

=== Ownership and exhibition history ===
The painting remained in Hopper's ownership for several years. According to notes in Jo's journal, it was displayed at the Salmagundi Club's 75th anniversary exhibition in 1945, where Edward had been invited as a guest exhibitor. At the exhibition, the painting was awarded a $1,000 prize.

The journal includes a note, partially crossed out, indicating that the painting was sold in the spring 1948 to the Butler Art Institute in Youngstown, Ohio for "1,500 -1/3", paid on July 27, 1949. A conflicting note immediately below suggests that the painting was instead sold to the Walker Art Center in Minneapolis for the same amount, on June 27, 1949.

Another note in Jo’s handwriting cites an insurance value of $15,000 for the painting, as provided by John Clancy in 1964.

In 2006, the painting was on display for several months at the Whitney Museum of American Art for an exhibition.

== Analysis ==
Several clues provide context. The high angle from which the viewer looks down on the office implies that the viewer may be observing in from a passing elevated train. Hopper later informed Norman A. Geske, the curator of the Walker Art Center, which acquired the painting in 1948, that the idea for the painting was "probably first suggested by many rides on the 'L' train in New York City after dark glimpses of office interiors that were so fleeting as to leave fresh and vivid impressions on my mind." This may suggest the office is not intended to convey prestige, a view supported by the unusual lozenge shape of the room and the small size of the man's desk. A smaller desk, holding a typewriter, may belong to the woman, which has led to suggest that she could be his secretary.

Still, this office appears to be a corner space, which may suggest it is the most prestigious available space in their small organization. This could suggest that the man holds a managerial or leadership position, although this is speculative without further supporting evidence.

As in many of his other paintings, Hopper conveys a sense of movement through the wind-blown curtain. In this painting, the ring at the bottom of the drawstring on the blind swings outward after the blind has been blown in by a gust of wind, possibly in response to a cross-breeze caused by the passing train.

The gust explains two other details. First, a sheet of paper lies on the floor beside the desk, suggesting it was blown there from the desk and caught the woman's eye. Second, the wind has caused the woman's dress to be blown tightly around her legs, emphasizing the movement and atmosphere of the scene. Meanwhile, the man remains focused on the document, unaware of the outside disruption.

There are various interpretations of the relationship between the two individuals in this painting. In some of Hopper's works, such as Evening Wind (1921) and Summertime (1943), the movement of curtains or blinds can symbolize emotional or physical stirrings. By contrast, listless curtains may suggest emotional stagnation or an inability to connect other works like Eleven A.M. (1926) and Hotel by a Railroad (1952). These interpretations are open to discussion and may vary depending on the viewer's perspective.

One critic writes, "Although the room is brightly lit, we sense that something strange is going on. Apart from the relationship between the two figures, the suspenseful mood arises from the circumstance that they are apparently poring over confidential material at this late hour, looking for a certain document that has yet to turn up." The man's intense concentration might suggest the matter is urgent, as he has not chosen to keep his jacket on despite the warmth in the room, indicated by the open windows. He also seems unaware of the wind, which has caused a page to fall to the floor.

Another critic observes, "In this painting Hopper offers more clues to a narrative than he ordinarily does. To the left of the desk is a piece of paper the woman has just seen. One assumes that when this voluptuous female reaches for the paper, her action will arouse the man. On the back wall Hopper has painted a section of artificial light, which in turn dramatizes the point where the man and woman will interact with each other." While this is one interpretation, another possibility is to view the painting as part of a series about lost opportunities. For instance, the woman might bend down and, like the figure in Night Windows (1928), reveal her presence to unseen observers on the elevated train, still unnoticed by her male companion.

Early proposed titles for the painting included Room 1005 and Confidentially Yours, which may suggest that the relationship between the man and the woman involves a high level of trust, or that they are working together on a confidential matter. In the end, Hopper chose the more ambiguous title Office at Night.

As in other nighttime scenes, Hopper needed to realistically recreate the complexity of a room lit by multiple, overlapping sources of varying brightness. In Office at Night, the light comes from three sources: an overhead light, a lamp on the man's desk, which sheds a small puddle of intense light, and from a street-light shining in the open window on the right-hand side. Hopper reported that the overlap of the ceiling light and the exterior light presented technical challenges, as it required him to use different shades of white to convey the idea of degrees of shadow. A close examination of the corner behind the woman reveals the faint shadow she casts in the weak light of the ceiling fixture, nearly obscured by the sharply etched shadow of the filing cabinet illuminated by the light of the street lamp.

=== See also ===
- List of works by Edward Hopper
- Office in a Small City
