= List of works by Edward Hopper =

The following is an incomplete list of works by American painter Edward Hopper.

Title	Medium	Date	Collection	Dimensions	Image
Cylinder	Charcoal on paper	1894	Whitney Museum of American Art	37.9 cm × 27.3 cm (14 15/16 in. × 10 3/4 in.)	
Sailboats	Watercolor, graphite pencil on paper	1895	Whitney Museum of American Art	10.8 cm × 12.5 cm (4 1/4 in. × 4 15/16 in.)	
At Valley Forge	graphite pencil on paper	1895	Whitney Museum of American Art	20 cm × 15.6 cm (7 7/8 in. × 6 1/8 in.)	
The Lion at Play	Watercolor on paper	1896	Whitney Museum of American Art	10.8 cm × 16.8 cm (4 1/4 in. × 6 5/8 in.)	
Satan in Red	Oil on paperboard	1900	Whitney Museum of American Art	31.3 cm × 23.7 cm (12 5/16 in. × 9 5/16 in.)	
Dutch Girl	Oil on canvas	1900	Whitney Museum of American Art	94.9 cm × 65.2 cm (37 3/8 in. × 25 11/16 in.)	
Standing Indian Chief	Oil on canvas	1901	Whitney Museum of American Art	35.7 cm × 20.3 cm (14 1/16 in. × 8 in.)	
Young Woman in a Studio	Oil on paperboard	1901-1902	Whitney Museum of American Art	31.4 cm × 23.8 cm (12 3/8 in. × 9 3/8 in.)	
Standing Girl in White Dress	Oil on paperboard	1902	Whitney Museum of American Art	43 cm × 31 cm (16 5/16 in. × 12 3/16 in.)	
Nude Walking through Doorway	Oil on paperboard	1902	Whitney Museum of American Art	31 cm × 23.2 cm (12 3/16 in. × 9 1/8 in.)	
Seated Male Nude Seen From Behind	Oil on canvas	1902-1903	Whitney Museum of American Art	61 cm × 41 cm (24 in. × 16 1/8 in.)	
Female Nude, from Rear, Seated on a Stool	Oil on board	1902-1904	Whitney Museum of American Art	46.8 cm × 31 cm (18 7/16 in. × 12 3/16 in.)	
Standing Male Nude, from Rear	Oil on canvas	1902-1904	Whitney Museum of American Art	125.1 cm × 75.2 cm (49 1/4 in. × 29 5/8 in.)	
Male Nude with Raised Arms	Oil on canvas	1902-1904	Whitney Museum of American Art	112.1 cm × 66.4 cm (44 1/8 in. × 26 1/8 in.)	
Standing Male Nude	Oil on canvas	1902-1904	Whitney Museum of American Art	105.7 cm × 59.7 cm (41 5/8 in. × 23 1/2 in.)	
Standing Male Nude	Oil on canvas	1902-1904	Whitney Museum of American Art	105.3 cm × 69.2 cm (41 7/16 in. × 27 1/4 in.)	
Seated Male Nude	Oil on canvas	1902-1904	Whitney Museum of American Art	100.3 cm × 105.6 cm (39 1/2 in. × 41 9/16 in.)	
Standing Nude	Oil on canvas	1902-1904	Whitney Museum of American Art	56.5 cm × 38.7 cm (22 1/4 in. × 15 1/4 in.)	
Standing Nude	Oil on canvas	1902-1904	Whitney Museum of American Art	105.1 cm × 67.6 cm (41 3/8 in. × 26 5/8 in.)	
Standing Nude	Oil on linen	1902-1904	Whitney Museum of American Art	112.1 cm × 66.7 cm (44 1/8 in. × 26 1/4 in.)	
Reclining Female Nude, from Rear	Oil on paperboard	1902-1904	Whitney Museum of American Art	30.5 cm × 47 cm (12 in. × 18 1/2 in.)	
Painter and Model	Oil on composition board	1902-1904	Whitney Museum of American Art	26.4 cm × 21 cm (10 3/8 in. × 8 1/4 in.)	
Solitary Figure in a Theater	Oil on board	1902-1904	Whitney Museum of American Art	31.8 cm × 23.7 cm (12 1/2 in. × 9 5/16 in.)	
Don Quixote on Horseback	Oil on paperboard	1902-1904	Whitney Museum of American Art	43.2 cm × 31.1 cm (17 in. × 12 1/4 in.)	
Still Life with Wine Bottle and Metal Bowl	Oil on paperboard	1903	Whitney Museum of American Art	20.2 cm × 26.4 cm (7 15/16 in. × 10 3/8 in.)	
Still Life with Earthenware Jug	Oil on canvas	1903	Whitney Museum of American Art	56.4 cm × 46.2 cm (22 3/16 in. × 18 3/16 in.)	
Self-Portrait	Oil on canvas	1903	Whitney Museum of American Art	35.9 cm × 25.9 cm (14 1/8 in. × 10 3/16 in.)	
Nude Crawling into Bed	Oil on composition board	1903-1905	Whitney Museum of American Art	31.4 cm × 23.3 cm (12 3/8 in. × 9 3/16 in.)	
Portrait of Model, Jimmy Corsi	Oil on canvas	1903-1906	Whitney Museum of American Art	89.1 cm × 50.8 cm (35 in. × 20 1/16 in.)	
Portrait of a Woman	Oil on canvas	1903-1906	Whitney Museum of American Art	56.2 cm × 46.4 cm (22 1/8 in. × 18 1/4 in.)	
Portrait of a Young Man	Oil on canvas	1903-1906	Whitney Museum of American Art	56.2 cm × 46 cm (22 1/8 in. × 18 1/8 in.)	
Self-Portrait	Oil on canvas	1903-1906	Whitney Museum of American Art	71.4 cm × 46.4 cm (28 1/8 in. × 18 1/4 in.)	
Self-Portrait	Oil on board	1903-1906	Whitney Museum of American Art	43 cm × 31.3 cm (16 15/16 in. × 12 5/16 in.)	
Self-Portrait	Oil on canvas	1903-1906	Whitney Museum of American Art	65.9 cm × 56.2 cm (25 15/16 in. × 22 1/8 in.)	
Two Standing Men at Easel	Oil on paperboard	1903-1906	Whitney Museum of American Art	43.2 cm × 31.3 cm (17 in. × 12 5/16 in.)	
Student and Teacher at the Easel	Oil on board	1903-1906	Whitney Museum of American Art	32.1 cm × 23.7 cm (12 5/8 in. × 9 5/16 in.)	
Painting Class	Oil on canvas	1903-1906	Whitney Museum of American Art	56.7 cm × 47 cm (22 5/16 in. × 18 1/2 in.)	
Seated Man with Standing Figure	Oil on board	1903-1906	Whitney Museum of American Art	47.3 cm × 31.6 cm (18 5/8 in. × 12 7/16 in.)	
Blond Woman Before an Easel	Oil on board	1903-1906	Whitney Museum of American Art	43.2 cm × 31.3 cm (23 3/4 in. × 28 7/8 in.)	
Portrait of a Man	Oil on canvas	1903-1906	Whitney Museum of American Art	60 cm × 52.4 cm (23 5/8 in. × 20 5/8 in.)	
Group of Musicians in an Orchestra Pit	Oil on canvas	1904-1906	Whitney Museum of American Art	38.4 cm × 30.6 cm (15 1/8 in. × 12 1/16 in.)	
Ferry Slip	Oil on paperboard	1904-1906	Whitney Museum of American Art	31.4 cm × 23.7 cm (12 3/8 in. × 9 5/16 in.)	
Sailboat at Dock	Oil on paperboard	1904-1906	Whitney Museum of American Art	28.9 cm × 23.3 cm (12 3/8 in. × 9 3/16 in.)	
Rooftops of Ferry Slip	Oil on paperboard	1904-1906	Whitney Museum of American Art	43.2 cm × 31.3 cm (17 in. × 12 5/16 in.)	
Porch Steps	Oil on paperboard	1904-1906	Whitney Museum of American Art	13.3 cm × 9.7 cm (5 1/4 in. × 3 13/16 in.)	
Portrait of Hettie Duryea Meade	Oil on canvas	1905	Whitney Museum of American Art	126.2 cm × 84.5 cm (49 11/16 in. × 33 1/4 in.)	
Portrait of Marion Hopper	Oil on canvas	1905-1906	Whitney Museum of American Art	114.9 cm × 70 cm (45 1/4 in. × 27 9/16 in.)	
Portrait of an Old Woman	Oil on canvas	1905-1906	Whitney Museum of American Art	59.7 cm × 49.5 cm (23 1/2 in. × 19 1/2 in.)	
Portrait of a Young Man	Oil on canvas	1905-1906	Whitney Museum of American Art	51.3 cm × 40.6 cm (20 3/16 in. × 16 in.)	
Portrait of a Man with Spectacles	Oil on canvas	1905-1906	Whitney Museum of American Art	50.8 cm × 38.7 cm (20 in. × 15 1/4 in.)	
Seated Woman at Piano	Oil on board	1905-1906	Whitney Museum of American Art	40 cm × 31.1 cm (15 3/4 in. × 12 1/4 in.)	
Man Seated on Bed	Oil on canvas mounted on board	1905-1906	Whitney Museum of American Art	28.6 cm × 23.5 cm (11 1/4 in. × 9 1/4 in.)	
Studies of Hands	Oil on board	1905-1906	Whitney Museum of American Art	42.9 cm × 31.1 cm (16 7/8 in. × 12 1/4 in.)	
Man Drinking	Oil on board	1905-1906	Whitney Museum of American Art	35.9 cm × 25.7 cm (14 1/8 in. × 10 1/8 in.)	
The Artist's Bedroom, Nyack	Oil on linen	1905-1906	Whitney Museum of American Art	35.6 cm × 25.4 cm (14 in. × 10 in.)	
Artist's Bedroom, Nyack	Oil on composition board	1905-1906	Whitney Museum of American Art	38.4 cm × 28.3 cm (15 1/8 in. × 11 1/8 in.)	
Steps in Paris	Oil on wood	1906	Whitney Museum of American Art	33 cm × 23.5 cm (13 in. × 9 1/4 in.)	
Bridge and Embankment	Oil on wood	1906	Whitney Museum of American Art	33 cm × 23.7 cm (13 in. × 9 5/16 in.)	
Statue Near the Louvre	Oil on board	1906	Whitney Museum of American Art	33 cm × 23.5 cm (13 in. × 9 1/4 in.)	
Bridge in Paris	Oil on wood	1906	Whitney Museum of American Art	23.5 cm × 33 cm (9 1/4 in. × 13 in.)	
Stairway at 48 rue de Lille, Paris	Oil on wood	1906	Whitney Museum of American Art	32.7 cm × 23.7 cm (12 7/8 in. × 9 5/16 in.)	
View Across Interior Courtyard at 48 rue de Lille, Paris	Oil on wood	1906	Whitney Museum of American Art	33 cm × 23.5 cm (13 in. × 9 1/4 in.)	
Interior Courtyard at 48 rue de Lille, Paris	Oil on wood	1906	Whitney Museum of American Art	33 cm × 23.5 cm (13 in. × 9 1/4 in.)	
Two Figures at Top of Steps in Paris	Oil on canvas board	1906	Whitney Museum of American Art	33 cm × 23.5 cm (13 in. × 9 1/4 in.)	
Paris Street	Oil on canvas board	1906	Whitney Museum of American Art	30.5 cm × 23.7 cm (23 in. × 9 5/16 in.)	
Woman Walking	Oil on wood	1906	Whitney Museum of American Art	33 cm × 23.5 cm (13 in. × 9 1/4 in.)	
Woman Seated at Table	Oil on composition board	1906	Whitney Museum of American Art	43 cm × 31.3 cm (16 15/16 in. × 12 5/16 in.)	
Le Pont des Arts	Oil on canvas	1907	Whitney Museum of American Art	60.2 cm × 73.2 cm (23 11/16 in. × 28 13/16 in.)	
Après-midi de juin	Oil on canvas	1907	Whitney Museum of American Art	60.3 cm × 73.3 cm (23 3/4 in. × 28 7/8 in.)	
Le Louvre et la Seine	Oil on canvas	1907	Whitney Museum of American Art	60 cm × 7.27 cm (23 5/8 in. × 28 5/8 in.)	
Trees in Sunlight, Parc de Saint-Cloud	Oil on canvas	1907	Whitney Museum of American Art	60 cm × 73.3 cm (23 5/8 in. × 28 7/8 in.)	
Park Benches and Trees	Oil on canvas mounted on composition board	1907	Whitney Museum of American Art	23.8 cm × 33.3 cm (9 3/8 in. × 13 1/8 in.)	
Louvre and Boat Landing	Oil on canvas	1907	Whitney Museum of American Art	60 cm × 73 cm (23 5/8 in. × 28 3/4 in.)	
Le Parc de Saint-Cloud	Oil on canvas	1907	Whitney Museum of American Art	60.3 cm × 73.5 cm (23 3/4 in. × 28 15/16 in.)	
Canal Lock at Charenton	Oil on canvas	1907	Whitney Museum of American Art	59.7 cm × 73 cm (23 1/2 in. × 28 3/4 in.)	
Canal at Charneton	Oil on canvas	1907	Whitney Museum of American Art	60.3 cm × 73 cm (23 3/4 in. × 28 3/4 in.)	
Gateway and Fence, Saint-Cloud	Oil on canvas	1907	Whitney Museum of American Art	60 cm × 72.5 cm (23 5/8 in. × 28 9/16 in.)	
Boat Landing at Gare d'Orléans	Oil on canvas	1907	Whitney Museum of American Art	59.7;cm × 73.7 cm (23 1/2 in. × 29 in.)	
Le Pavillon de Flore in the Spring	Oil on canvas	1907	Whitney Museum of American Art	60.2;cm × 72.9 cm (23 11/16 in. × 28 11/16 in.)	
Pont du Carrousel and Gare d'Orléans	Oil on canvas	1907	Whitney Museum of American Art	60.2 cm × 73.2 cm (23 3/4 in. × 28 7/8 in.)	
Pont du Carrousel in the Fog	Oil on canvas	1907	Whitney Museum of American Art	60.3 cm × 73.3 cm (23 11/16 in. × 28 13/16 in.)	
The El Station	Oil on canvas	1907	Whitney Museum of American Art	51.4 cm × 74.5 cm (20 1/4 in. × 29 5/16 in.)	
Le Quai des Grands Augustins with Tree	Oil on canvas	1907	Whitney Museum of American Art	60.5 cm × 73.7 cm (23 13/16 in. × 29 in.)	
Park Scene	Oil on canvas	1907	Whitney Museum of American Art	56.2 cm × 66 cm (22 1/2 in. × 26 in.)	
Tugboat at Boulevard Saint Michel	Oil on canvas	1907	Whitney Museum of American Art	60 cm × 73.7 cm (23 5/8 in. × 29 in.)	
River and Buildings	Oil on board	1907	Whitney Museum of American Art	23.5 cm × 33 cm (9 1/4 in. × 13 in.)	
Notre Dame de Paris	Oil on board	1907	Whitney Museum of American Art	59.7 cm × 73 cm (23 1/2 in. × 28 3/4 in.)	
Notre Dame, No. 2	Oil on board	1907	Whitney Museum of American Art	59.7 cm × 73 cm (23 1/2 in. × 28 3/4 in.)	
Les lavoirs à Pont Royal	Oil on canvas	1907	Whitney Museum of American Art	59.7 cm × 73 cm (23 1/2 in. × 28 3/4 in.)	
Railroad Train	Oil on canvas	1908	Addison Gallery of American Art	61.6 cm × 73.66 cm (24 1/4 in. × 29 in.)	
Tugboat with Black Smokestack	Oil on canvas	1908	Whitney Museum of American Art	51.8 cm × 74.5 cm (20 3/8 in. × 29 5/16 in.)	
Île Saint-Louis	Oil on canvas	1909	Whitney Museum of American Art	60 cm × 73 cm (23 5/8 in. × 28 3/4 in.)	
River Boat	Oil on canvas	1909	Whitney Museum of American Art	97 cm × 122.4 cm (38 3/16 in. × 48 3/16 in.)	
The Louvre in a Thunderstorm	Oil on canvas	1909	Whitney Museum of American Art	59.8 cm × 73.2 cm (23 9/16 in. × 28 13/16 in.)	
Bridge on the Seine	Oil on canvas	1909	Whitney Museum of American Art	60 cm × 73.3 cm (23 5/8 in. × 28 7/8 in.)	
Écluse de la Monnaie	Oil on canvas	1909	Whitney Museum of American Art	60 cm × 73.3 cm (23 5/8 in. × 28 7/8 in.)	
Le Bistro or The Wine Shop	Oil on canvas	1909	Whitney Museum of American Art	61 cm × 73.3 cm (24 in. × 28 7/8 in.)	
Valley of the Seine	Oil on canvas	1909	Whitney Museum of American Art	64 cm × 96.4 cm (26 in. × 37 15/16 in.)	
Summer Interior	Oil on canvas	1909	Whitney Museum of American Art	61.6 cm × 74.1 cm (24 1/4 in. × 29 3/16 in.)	
Le Pont Royal	Oil on canvas	1909	Whitney Museum of American Art	61 cm × 73.8 cm (24 in. × 29 1/16 in.)	
Le Quai des Grands Augustins	Oil on canvas	1909	Whitney Museum of American Art	60.2 cm × 73 cm (23 11/16 in × 28 3/4 in.)	
Le Pavillon de Flore	Oil on canvas	1909	Whitney Museum of American Art	60 cm × 73.2 cm (23 5/8 in × 28 13/16 in.)	
Sailing	Oil on canvas	1911	Carnegie Museum of Art	60.96 cm × 73.66 cm (24 in. × 29 in.)	
Blackwell's Island	Oil on canvas	1911	Whitney Museum of American Art	61.9 cm × 74.5 cm (24 3/8 in. × 2 5/16 in.)	
American Village	Oil on canvas	1912	Whitney Museum of American Art	66 cm × 96.8 cm (26 in. × 38 1/8 in.)	
Briar Neck, Gloucester	Oil on canvas	1912	Whitney Museum of American Art	61.4 cm × 74 cm (24 3/16 in. × 38 5/16 in.)	
Squam Light	Oil on canvas	1912	Private Collection	61 cm × 73.7 cm (24 in. × 29 in.)	
Gloucester Harbor	Oil on canvas	1912	Whitney Museum of American Art	67 cm × 97.3 cm (26 3/8 in. × 29 1/8 in.)	
Italian Quarter, Gloucester	Oil on canvas	1912	Whitney Museum of American Art	61.3 cm × 73.8 cm (24 1/8 in. × 29 1/16 in.)	
Tall Masts	Oil on canvas	1912	Whitney Museum of American Art	61.6 cm × 74.3 cm (24 1/4 in. × 29 1/4 in.)	
Queensborough Bridge	Oil on canvas	1913	Whitney Museum of American Art	65.7 cm × 96.8 cm (25 7/8 in. × 38 1/8 in.)	
Soir Bleu	Oil on canvas	1914	Whitney Museum of American Art	91.8 cm × 182.7 cm (36 1/8 in. × 71 15/16 in.)	
Rocks and Houses, Ogunquit	Oil on canvas	1914	Whitney Museum of American Art	61.6 cm × 74.3 cm (24 1/4 in. × 29 1/4 in.)	
Road in Maine	Oil on canvas	1914	Whitney Museum of American Art	61.6 cm × 74.3 cm (24 1/4 in. × 29 1/4 in.)	
Dories in a Cove	Oil on canvas	1914	Whitney Museum of American Art	25.1 cm × 33.7 cm (9 7/8 in. × 13 1/4 in.)	
Cove at Ogunquit	Oil on canvas	1914	Whitney Museum of American Art	62.2 cm × 74.6 cm (24 1/2 in. × 29 3/8 in.)	
Square Rock, Ogunquit	Oil on canvas	1914	Whitney Museum of American Art	61.8 cm × 74.3 cm (24 5/16 in. × 29 1/4 in.)	
Sea at Ogunquit	Oil on canvas	1914	Whitney Museum of American Art	61.8 cm × 74.3 cm (24 5/16 in. × 29 1/4 in.)	
The Dories, Ogunquit	Oil on canvas	1914	Whitney Museum of American Art	61.6 cm × 74.3 cm (24 1/4 in. × 29 1/4 in.)	
Elizabeth Griffiths Smith Hopper, The Artist's Mother	Oil on canvas	1915-1916	Whitney Museum of American Art	95.6 cm × 81.3 cm (37 5/8 in. × 32 in.)	
Rocky Cliffs by the Sea	Oil on canvas	1916	Whitney Museum of American Art	24.4 cm × 32.7 cm (9 5/8 in. × 12 7/8 in.)	
Rocks and Sand	Oil on canvas	1916	Whitney Museum of American Art	24.4 cm × 33 cm (9 5/8 in. × 13 in.)	
Yonkers	Oil on canvas	1916-1919	Whitney Museum of American Art	61.8 cm × 74.1 cm (24 5/16 in. × 29 3/16 in.)	
Bluff	Oil on canvas	1916-1919	Whitney Museum of American Art	24.3 cm × 30.8 cm (9 9/16 in. × 12 1/8 in.)	
Bluffs	Oil on canvas	1916-1919	Whitney Museum of American Art	24.1 cm × 32.5 cm (9 9/16 in. × 12 1/8 in.)	
Bluffs, Monhegan Island	Oil on canvas	1916-1919	Whitney Museum of American Art	30.8 cm × 41 cm (12 1/8 in. × 16 1/8 in.)	
Blackhead, Monhegan	Oil on canvas	1916-1919	Whitney Museum of American Art	24.3 cm × 33.3 cm (9 1/2 in. × 12 13/16 in.)	
Blackhead, Monhegan	Oil on canvas	1916-1919	Whitney Museum of American Art	24.1 cm × 33 cm (9 1/2 in. × 13 in.)	
Blackhead, Monhegan	Oil on canvas	1916-1919	Whitney Museum of American Art	29.8 cm × 40.3 cm (11 3/4 in. × 15 7/8 in.)	
Rocks and Sea	Oil on canvas	1916-1919	Whitney Museum of American Art	29.8 cm × 40.8 cm (11 3/4 in. × 16 1/16 in.)	
Rocks and Shore	Oil on canvas	1916-1919	Whitney Museum of American Art	23.8 cm × 33 cm (9 3/8 in. × 13 in.)	
Rocks and Swirling Water	Oil on canvas	1916-1919	Whitney Museum of American Art	24.1 cm × 31.8 cm (9 1/2 in. × 12 1/2 in.)	
Rocks and Waves	Oil on canvas	1916-1919	Whitney Museum of American Art	24.5 cm × 33 cm (9 5/8 in. × 13 in.)	
Rocky Projection at the Sea	Oil on canvas	1916-1919	Whitney Museum of American Art	23.2 cm × 32.9 cm (9 1/8 in. × 12 15/16 in.)	
Rocky Projection	Oil on canvas	1916-1919	Whitney Museum of American Art	24.6 cm × 32.9 cm (9 11/16 in. × 12 15/16 in.)	
Rocky Sea Shore	Oil on canvas	1916-1919	Whitney Museum of American Art	24.5 cm × 33.2 cm (9 5/8 in. × 13 1/16 in.)	
Rocky Shore and Sea	Oil on canvas	1916-1919	Whitney Museum of American Art	30 cm × 40.2 cm (11 13/16 in. × 15 13/16 in.)	
Rocky Shore and Sea	Oil on canvas	1916-1919	Whitney Museum of American Art	30.3 cm × 41.1 cm (11 15/16 in. × 16 3/16 in.)	
Rocky Shore and Sea, Monhegan	Oil on canvas	1916-1919	Whitney Museum of American Art	24.4 cm × 33 cm (9 5/8 in. × 13 in.)	
Little Cove, Monhegan	Oil on composition board	1916-1919	Whitney Museum of American Art	24.3 cm × 33.2 cm (9 7/16 in. × 13 13/16 in.)	
Rocky Shore	Oil on canvas	1916-1919	Whitney Museum of American Art	24 cm × 32.5 cm (9 9/16 in. × 12 1/16 in.)	
Rocky Shore	Oil on canvas	1916-1919	Whitney Museum of American Art	24 cm × 33 cm (9 7/16 in. × 13 in.)	
Sea and Rocky Shore	Oil on canvas	1916-1919	Whitney Museum of American Art	24.1 cm × 33 cm (9 1/2 in. × 13 in.)	
Sea and Shore	Oil on canvas	1916-1919	Whitney Museum of American Art	24.3 cm × 32.7 cm (9 9/16 in. × 12 7/8 in.)	
Three Dories	Oil on canvas	1916-1919	Whitney Museum of American Art	24.6 cm × 33.2 cm (9 11/16 in. × 13 1/16 in.)	
Trees and Beach	Oil on canvas	1916-1919	Whitney Museum of American Art	24.1 cm × 33 cm (9 1/2 in. × 13 in.)	
Waves and Rocky Shore	Oil on canvas	1916-1919	Whitney Museum of American Art	29.8 cm × 40 cm (11 3/4 in. × 15 3/4 in.)	
Waves Crashing on Rocks, Monhegan	Oil on canvas	1916-1919	Whitney Museum of American Art	23.7 cm × 33.3 cm (9 5/16 in. × 13 1/8 in.)	
Landscape with Fence and Trees	Oil on canvas	1916-1919	Whitney Museum of American Art	24.4 cm × 32.5 cm (9 5/8 in. × 12 13/16 in.)	
Night on the El Train	Etching	1918	Private Collection	18.7 cm x 19.9 cm (7 3/8 in. x 7 13/16 in.)	
Small Town Station	Oil on canvas	1918-1920	Whitney Museum of American Art	66.7 cm × 97.3 cm (26 1/4 in. × 38 5/16 in.)	
Statue at Park Entrance	Oil on canvas	1918-1920	Whitney Museum of American Art	61.6 cm × 74.5 cm (24 1/4 in. × 29 5/16 in.)	
The El Station	Etching	1919–1923	Whitney Museum of American Art	17.5 cm x 22.4 cm (6 7/8 in. x 8 13/16 in.)	
American Landscape	Etching	1920	Philadelphia Museum of Art	18.4 cm × 31.8 cm (7 1/4 in. × 12 1/2 in.)	
House Tops	Etching	1921	Philadelphia Museum of Art	14.8 cm x 19.9 cm (5 13/16 in. x 7 13/16 in.)	
Night Shadows	Etching	1921	Whitney Museum of American Art & Metropolitan Museum of Art	17.4 cm × 20.8 cm (6 7/8 in. × 8 3/16 in.)	
Girl at Sewing Machine	Oil on canvas	1921	Thyssen-Bornemisza Museum	48.3 cm × 46 cm (19 in. × 18 in.)	
Evening Wind	Etching	1921	Whitney Museum of American Art & Metropolitan Museum of Art	17.6 cm × 21 cm (6 15/16 in. × 8 1/4 in.)	
New York Interior	Oil on canvas	c. 1921	Whitney Museum of American Art	61.8 cm × 74.6 cm (24 5/16 in. × 29 3/8 in.)	
Soldier Entering a Parlor	Oil on linen	1921	Whitney Museum of American Art	68.1 cm × 100.7 cm (26 3/4 in. × 39 5/8 in.)	
Native Attacking White Hunters	Oil on canvas	1922	Whitney Museum of American Art	67.9 cm × 100.6 cm (26 13/16 in. × 39 5/8 in.)	
Figures in Automobile Racing Alongside Freightcar	Oil on canvas	1922	Whitney Museum of American Art	67.9 cm × 100.6 cm (26 3/4 in. × 39 5/8 in.)	
East Side Interior	Etching	1922	Whitney Museum of American Art	20 cm × 24.9 cm (7 7/8 in. × 9 13/16 in.)	
The Cat Boat	Etching	1922	Addison Gallery of American Art	19.69 cm × 24.77 cm (7 3/4 in. × 9 3/4 in.)	
New York Restaurant	Oil on canvas	1922	Muskegon Museum of Art, Michigan	61 cm x 76.2 cm	
The Cat Boat	Etching on paper	1922	Smithsonian American Art Museum	20 cm × 24.9 cm (7 7/8 in. × 9 3/4 in.)	
Railroad Crossing	Oil on canvas	1922–1923	Whitney Museum of American Art	74.8 cm × 101.8 cm (29 7/16 in. × 4 1/16 in.)	
Apartment Houses	Oil on canvas	1923	Pennsylvania Academy of the Fine Arts	24 in. × 28 15/16 in.	
Drawing for Aux Fortifications	Charcoal, chalk, graphite on bristol board	1923	Pennsylvania Academy of the Fine Arts	13 13/16 in. × 18 7/16 in.	
The Mansard Roof	Watercolor on paper	1923	Brooklyn Museum	13 3/4 in. × 19 inches	
The Locomotive	Etching	1923	Whitney Museum of American Art		
The Lonely House	Etching	1923	Metropolitan Museum of Art	29.7 cm x 35.4 cm (11 11/16 in. x 13 15/16 in.)	
Moonlight Interior	Oil on canvas	1923			
House in Italian Quarter	Watercolor on paper	1923	Smithsonian American Art Museum	50.5 cm × 60.6 cm (19 7/8 in. × 23 7/8 in.)	
Haskell's House	Watercolor over graphite on paperboard	1924	National Gallery of Art	34.3 x 49.5 cm (13 1/2 x 19 1/2 in	
New York Pavements	Oil on canvas	1924–1925	Chrysler Museum of Art	62.9 × 75.6 cm (24 3/4 × 29 3/4 in.)	
House by the Railroad	Oil on canvas	1925	Museum of Modern Art	61 cm x 73.7 cm (24 in. x 29 in.)	
The Bootleggers	Oil on canvas	1925	Currier Museum of Art	77 cm × 97 cm (30 1/8 in. × 38 in.)	
Ranch House, Santa Fe	Watercolor	1925	Williams College Museum of Art		
Day after the Funeral	Watercolor, graphite on paper	1925	Private collection	32.5 cm × 50.6 cm (12 13/16 in. × 19 15/16 in.)	
Self-Portrait	Oil on canvas	1925–1930	Whitney Museum of American Art	64.5 cm × 51.8 cm (25 3/8 in. × 20 3/8 in.)	
Sunday	Oil on canvas	1926	The Phillips Collection	73.66 cm × 83.36 cm (29 in. × 34 in.)	
Universalist Church	Watercolor over graphite on cream wove paper	1926	Princeton University Art Museum	35.6 cm × 50.8 cm (14 in. × 20 in.)	
Maine in Fog	Oil on canvas	1926-1929	Whitney Museum of American Art	88.9 cm × 151.3 cm (35 in. × 59 9/16 in.)	
Drug Store	Oil on canvas	1927	Museum of Fine Arts, Boston	73.7 cm x 101.9 cm	
Lighthouse and Buildings, Portland Head, Cape Elizabeth, Maine	Watercolor over graphite pencil on paper	1927	Museum of Fine Arts, Boston	34.3 cm x 49.5 cm	
Lighthouse Hill	Oil on canvas	1927	Dallas Museum of Art	73.819 cm x 102.235 cm (29 1/16 in. x 40 1/4 in.)	
Captain Upton's House	Oil on canvas	1927	collection of Steve Martin	71.8 cm x 92.1 cm (28 1/4 in. x 36 1/4 in.)	
Coast Guard Station	Watercolor, graphite pencil on paper	1927	Whitney Museum of America Art	35.4 cm × 50.6 cm (13 15/16 in. × 19 15/16 in.)	
Coast Guard Station, Two Lights, Maine	Watercolor, gouache, charcoal on paper	1927	Metropolitan Museum of Art	35.2 cm × 50.5 cm (13 7/8 in. × 19 7/8 in.)	
Light at Two Lights	Watercolor, graphite pencil on paper	1927	Whitney Museum of American Art	35.4 cm × 50.8 cm (13 15/16 in. × 20 in.)	
Automat	Oil on canvas	1927	Des Moines Art Center	71.4 cm × 91.4 cm (28 in. × 36 in.)	
Two on the Aisle	Oil on canvas	1927	Toledo Museum of Art	102.2 cm × 122.6 cm	
The City	Oil on canvas	1927	University of Arizona Museum of Art		
Cape Ann Granite	Oil on canvas	1928	Private Collection	71.1 cm × 102.2 cm (29 in. × 40 1/4 in.)	
Night Windows	Oil on canvas	1928	Museum of Modern Art	73.7 cm x 86.4 cm (29 in. x 34 in.)	
Manhattan Bridge Loop	Oil on canvas	1928	Addison Gallery of American Art	88.9 cm × 152.4 cm (35 in. × 60 in.)	Manhattan Bridge Loop
From Williamsburg Bridge	Oil on canvas	1928	Metropolitan Museum of Art	74.6 cm × 111.1 cm (29 3/8 in. × 43 3/4 in.)	
Blackwell's Island	Oil on canvas	1928	Crystal Bridges Museum of American Art	87.6 cm × 151.3 cm (34.5 in. × 59.5 in.)	
Freight Cars, Gloucester	Oil on canvas	1928	Addison Gallery of American Art	73.66 cm × 101.92 cm (29 in. × 40 1/8 in.)	
Chop Suey	Oil on canvas	1929	Barney A. Ebsworth Collection	81.3 cm × 96.5 cm (32 in. × 38 in.)	
The Lighthouse at Two Lights	Oil on canvas	1929	Metropolitan Museum of Art	74.9 cm × 109.9 cm (29.5 in. × 43.25 in.)	
Coast Guard Station	Oil on canvas	1929	Montclair Art Museum	73.7 cm × 109.2 cm (29 in. × 43 in.)	
Railroad Sunset	Oil on canvas	1929	Whitney Museum of American Art	74.5 cm × 122.2 cm (29 5/16 in. × 48 1/8 in.)	
Early Sunday Morning	Oil on canvas	1930	Whitney Museum of American Art	89.4 cm × 153 cm (35.2 in. × 60.3 in.)	
Tables for Ladies	Oil on canvas	1930	Metropolitan Museum of Art	122.6 cm × 153 cm (48.25 in. × 60.25 in.)	
Apartment Houses, East River	Oil on canvas	1930	Whitney Museum of American Art	89.1 cm × 152.7 cm (35 1/16 in. × 60 1/8 in.)	
Corn Hill (Truro, Cape Cod)	Oil on canvas	1930	McNay Art Institute, San Antonio	72.4 cm × 108cm cm (28 1/2 in. × 42 1/2 in.)	
Hills, South Truro	Oil on canvas	1930	Cleveland Museum of Art	69.5 cm × 109.5 cm	
House in Provincetown	Watercolor	1930	University of Oklahoma Museum of Art		
Cobb's Barns, South Truro	Fabricated chalk and wax crayon on paper	1930–1933	Whitney Museum of American Art	87.2 cm x 127.2 cm (34.33 in. x 50.08 in.)	
New York, New Haven and Hartford	Oil on canvas	1931	Indianapolis Museum of Art	81.28 cm x 127 cm (32 in. x 50 in.)	
Hotel Room	Oil on canvas	1931	Thyssen-Bornemisza Museum		
Barber Shop	Oil on canvas	1931	Neuberger Museum of Art	60 in. × 78 in.	Oil painting by american artist Edward Hopper
Roofs of the Cobb Barn	Watercolor on paper	1931	Crystal Bridges Museum of American Art	50.6 cm x 70.8 cm (19.94 in. × 27.88 in.)	
Dauphinée House		1932	ACA Galleries		
Room in New York	Oil on canvas	1932	Sheldon Memorial Art Gallery and Sculpture Garden, Lincoln NE	73.66 cm × 93.028 cm (29 in. × 36 5/8 in.)	
Room in Brooklyn	Oil on canvas	1932	Museum of Fine Arts, Boston	73.98 cm × 86.36 cm (29 1/8 in. × 34 in.)	
Locust Trees	Watercolor & graphite on wove paper	1932	Addison Gallery of American Art	35.56 cm × 50.8 cm (14 in. × 20 in.)	
Ryder's House	Oil on canvas	1933	Smithsonian American Art Museum	91.6 cm × 127 cm (36 1/8 in. × 50 in.)	
Sun on Prospect Street (Gloucester, Massachusetts)	Oil on canvas	1934	Cincinnati Art Museum	71.1 cm x 92.1 cm (28 in. x 36 1/4 in.)	
East Wind Over Weehawken	Oil on canvas	1934	Pennsylvania Academy of the Fine Arts (1952–2013); Private collection	86.4 cm × 127.6 cm (34 in × 50.2 in)	
House at Dusk	Oil on canvas	1935	Virginia Museum of Fine Arts	92.08 cm × 127 cm (36 1/4 in. × 50 in.)	
Shakespeare at Dusk	Oil on canvas	1935	private collection		
The Long Leg	Oil on canvas	1935	The Huntington Library Collection	50.8 cm x 76.8 cm (20 in. x 30 1/4 in.)	
Macomb's Dam Bridge	Oil on canvas	1935	Brooklyn Museum	88.9 cm x 152.9 cm (35 in. x 60 3/16 in.)	Macomb's Dam Bridge
The Circle Theater	Oil on canvas	1936	Private collection		
Jo Painting	Oil on canvas	1936	Whitney Museum of American Art	46.2 cm × 41.1 cm (18 3/16 in. × 16 3/16 in.)	
Cape Cod Afternoon	Oil on canvas	1936	Museum of Art, Carnegie Institute	86.36 cm × 127 cm (34 in. × 50 in.)	
The Sheridan Theater	Oil on canvas	1937	Newark Museum	64.13 cm x 43.56 cm (25.25 in. x 17.15 in.)	
White River at Sharon	Watercolor and pencil on paper	1937	Smithsonian American Art Museum	55.3 cm × 75.6 cm (21 3/4 in. × 29 3/4 in.)	White River at Sharon
Mouth of Pamet River—Fall Tide	Watercolor and graphite pencil on paper	1937	Collection of Thelma Z. & Melvin Lenkin	55.4 cm × 68.1 cm (21 13/16 in. × 26 13/16 in.)	
Compartment C, Car 293	Oil on canvas	1938	IBM Corporation Collection		
Cottages at North Truro	Watercolor, pencil on paper	1938		50.8 cm x 71.1 cm (20 in. x 28 in.)	
Bridle Path	Oil on canvas	1939		59.4 cm × 107 cm (23.375 in. × 42.125 in.)	
New York Movie	Oil on canvas	1939	Museum of Modern Art	81.9 cm x 101.9 cm (32 1/4 in. x 40 1/8 in.)	
Cod Evening	Oil on canvas	1939	National Gallery of Art	76.2 cm x 101.6 cm (30 in. x 40 in.)	
Ground Swell	Oil on canvas	1939	National Gallery of Art	91.92 cm × 127.16 cm (36 3/16 × 50 1/16 in.)	
Gas	Oil on canvas	1940	Museum of Modern Art	66.7 cm × 102.2 cm (26 1/4 in. × 40 1/4 in.)	
Office at Night	Oil on canvas	1940	Walker Art Center	56.4 × 63.8 cm (22.2 in. × 25.2 in)	Office at Night
The Lee Shore	Oil on canvas	1941	Private collection	71.76 cm x 109.22 cm (28.25 in. x 43 in.)	
Nighthawks	Oil on canvas	1942	Art Institute of Chicago	84.1 cm × 152.4 cm (33 1/8 in. × 60 in.)	
Dawn in Pennsylvania	Oil on canvas	1942	Terra Foundation for American Art	61.9 cm x 112.4 cm (24 3/8 in. x 44 1/4 in.)	
Hotel Lobby	Oil on canvas	1943	Indianapolis Museum of Art	81.9 cm × 103.5 cm (32 1/4 in. × 40 3/4 in.)	Hotel Lobby
Summertime	Oil on canvas	1943	Delaware Art Museum	74 cm × 111.8 cm (29 1/8 in. × 44 in.)	
Saltillo Mansion	Watercolor on paper	1943	Metropolitan Museum of Art	54 cm × 68.9 cm (21 1/4 in. × 27 1/8 in.)	Saltillo Mansion
Solitude		1944	Private collection	81.3 cm × 127 cm	
Morning in a City	Oil on canvas	1944	Williams College Museum of Art	112.5 cm × 152 cm (44 5/16 × 59 13/16 in.)	
Rooms for Tourists	Oil on canvas	1945	Yale University Art Gallery	76.8 cm × 107 cm (30 1/4 in. × 42 1/8 in.)	
August in the City	Oil on canvas	1945	Norton Museum of Art; West Palm Beach		
Jo in Wyoming	Watercolor and graphite pencil on paper	1946	Whitney Museum of American Art	35.4 cm × 50.6 cm (13 15/16 × 19 15/16 in.)	
Approaching a City	Oil on canvas	1946	The Phillips Collection		
El Palacio	Watercolor and graphite pencil on paper	1946	Whitney Museum of American Art	57 cm × 77.8 cm (22 7/16 × 30 5/8 in.)	
Summer Evening	Oil on canvas	1947	Private collection		
Pennsylvania Coal Town		1947	Butler Institute of American Art		
Seven AM	Oil on canvas	1948	Whitney Museum of American Art	76.7 cm × 101.9 cm (30 3/16 in. × 40 1/8 in.)	
High Noon	Oil on canvas	1949	Dayton Art Institute	69.9 cm x 100.3 cm (27 1/2 in. x 39 1/2 in.)	
Conference at Night	Oil on canvas	1949	Wichita Art Museum	70.5 cm x 101.6 cm (27 3/4 in. x 40 in.)	
Stairway	Oil on canvas	1949	Whitney Museum of American Art	40.6 cm × 30.2 cm ( 16 in. × 11 7/8 in.)	
Cape Cod Morning	Oil on canvas	1950	Smithsonian American Art Museum	86.7 cm × 102.3 cm (34 1/8 in. × 40 1/4 in.)	
Portrait of Orleans	Oil on canvas	1950	De Young Museum, San Francisco	66 cm x 101.6 cm (26 in. x 40 in.)	
Rooms by the Sea	Oil on canvas	1951	Yale University Art Gallery	74.3 cm × 101.6 cm (29 1/4 in. × 40 in.)	
First Row Orchestra	Oil on canvas	1951	Hirshhorn Museum and Sculpture Garden	79 cm × 101.9 cm (31 1/8 in. × 40 1/8 in.)	
Morning Sun	Oil on canvas	1952	Columbus Museum of Art	71.4 cm × 101.9 cm (28 1/10 in. × 40 1/10 in.)	
Hotel by a Railroad	Oil on canvas	1952	Hirshhorn Museum and Sculpture Garden	79.4 cm x 101.9 cm (31.3 in. x 40.1 in)	
Sea Watchers		1952	Private collection		
Office in a Small City	Oil on canvas	1953	Metropolitan Museum of Art	71 cm × 102 cm (28 in. × 40 in.)	
City Sunlight	Oil on canvas	1954	Hirshhorn Museum	71.6 × 101.9 cm (28 3/16 in. × 40 1/8 in.)	
South Carolina Morning	Oil on canvas	1955	Whitney Museum of American Art	77.2 cm × 102.2 cm (30 3/8 in. × 40 1/4 in.)	
Hotel Window	Oil on canvas	1956	The Forbes Magazine Collection		
Four Lane Road	Oil on canvas	1956	Private collection		
Sunlight on Brownstones	Oil on canvas	1956	Brooklyn Museum	7.05 cm × 101.88 cm (30 3/8 in. × 40 1/4 in.)	
Western Motel	Oil on canvas	1957	Yale University Art Gallery	77.8 cm × 128.3 cm (30 1/4 in. × 50 1/8 in.)	
Sunlight in a Cafeteria	Oil on canvas	1958	Yale University Art Gallery	102.1 cm × 152.7 cm (40 3/16 in. × 60 1/8 in.)	
Excursion into Philosophy	Oil on canvas	1959	Private collection		
Second Story Sunlight	Oil on canvas	1960	Whitney Museum of American Art	102.1 cm × 127.3 cm (40 3/16 in. × 50 1/8 in.)	
People in the Sun	Oil on canvas	1960	Smithsonian American Art Museum; Washington, D.C.	102.6 cm × 153.4 cm (40 3/8 in. × 60 3/8 in.)	
A Woman in the Sun	Oil on canvas	1961	Whitney Museum of American Art	101.9 cm × 155.6 cm (40 1/8 in. × 61 1/4 in.)	
New York Office	Oil on canvas	1962	Montgomery Museum of Fine Arts	101.6 cm x 139.7 cm (40 in. x 55 in.)	
Intermission	Oil on canvas	1963	San Francisco Museum of Modern Art	101.6 cm × 152.4 cm (40 in. × 60 in.)	
Sun in an Empty Room	Oil on canvas	1963	Private collection	73 cm x 100.3 cm (28 3/4 in. x 39 1/2 in.)	
Chair Car	Oil on canvas	1965	Private collection	127 cm x 101.6 cm (50 in. x 40 in.)	
Two Comedians	Oil on canvas	1965	Private collection	73.7 cm × 101.6 cm	
