= The Bootleggers (Hopper) =

1925 painting by Edward Hopper

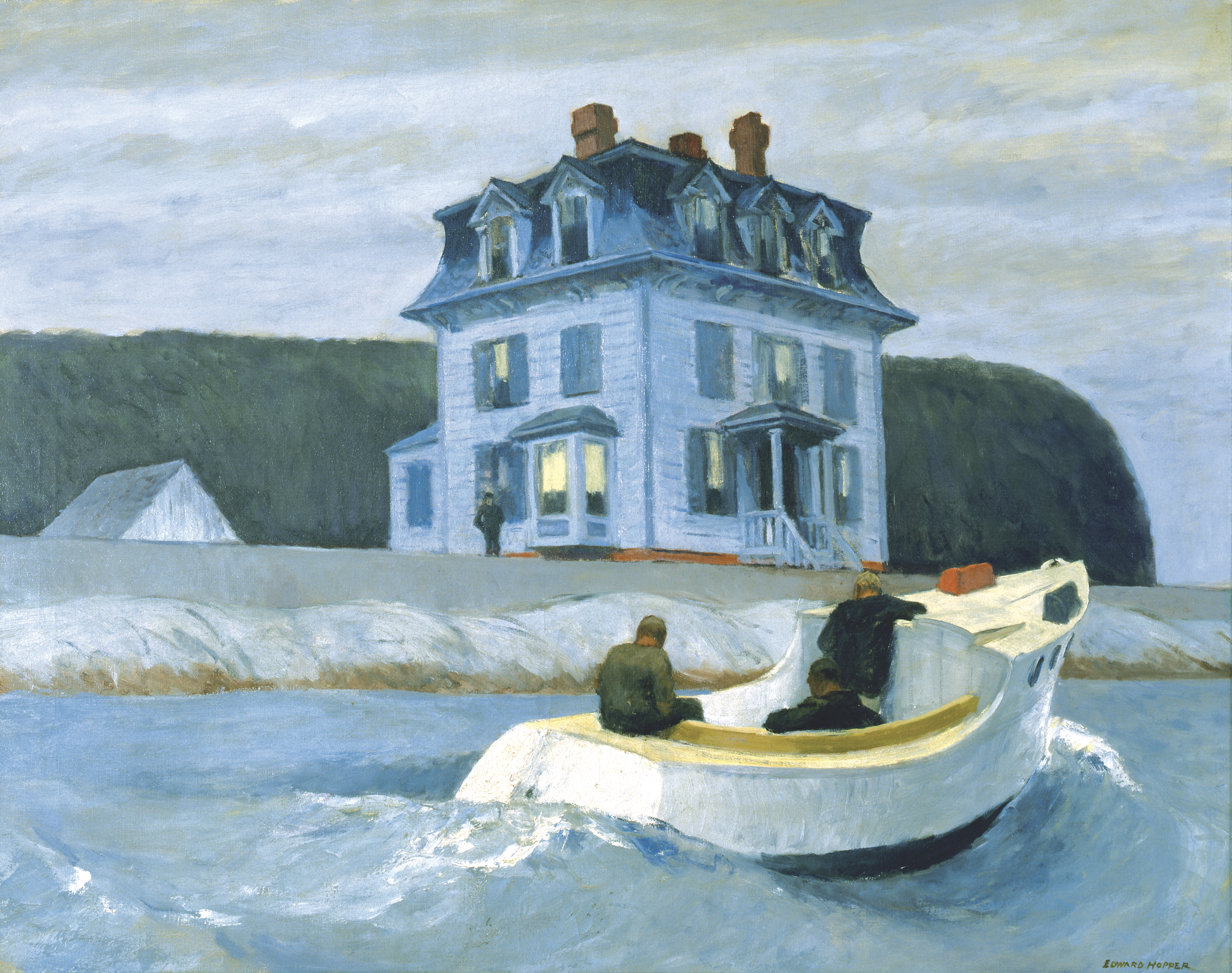
- Artist: Edward Hopper
- Year: 1925
- Medium: oil paint, canvas
- Movement: American realism
- Subject: rum-running
- Dimensions: 76.52 cm (30.13 in) × 96.52 cm (38.00 in)
- Location: Currier Museum of Art
- Accession: 1956.4

The Bootleggers is a 1925 painting by American realist Edward Hopper. The work generally marks the end of his early period before painting the House by the Railroad that same year, the start of his mature or classic period. The painting depicts a nautical scene in a subdued blue and gray palette, showing three men on board a motorboat staring at the shore where another man, standing besides a large house, stares back at them. It has been described and interpreted as Hopper's most overt, political, and even contrarian work.

Art historians and critics believe that the painting is loosely based on the history of rum-running during Prohibition (1920–1933). The scene is thought to depict the smuggling of alcohol along the coast of Gloucester, Massachusetts, but Hopper's art dealer made it known that the painting was not based on an actual location but on several different scenes blended together. The Bootleggers was first exhibited in November at the Brooklyn Museum, followed by several other showings. Hopper held on to the painting for almost three decades until the Currier Museum of Art acquired it for their collection in 1956.

== Background ==
Edward Hopper maintained a lifelong interest in nautical themes, a passion that began in his early life growing up in the village of Nyack, New York, once known for its port and former shipbuilding industry on the west bank of the Hudson River. As a teenager in Nyack, Hopper was an introvert; his father persuaded him to build a sailboat to try and make him more sociable. Hopper built himself a catboat and later considered pursuing a career in naval engineering. He would often bicycle from his home to the end of Van Houten Street to watch boats being built and launched at the shipyards. At 11 years of age, Hopper painted The Race (1893), a watercolor featuring two boats. Hopper completed what is considered his first oil painting, Rowboat in Rocky Cove (1895), at the age of 13.

Early nautical works he created during this time include Sailboat (c. 1900) and Tramp Steamer (1908). In the summer of 1912, Hopper began painting in the village of Gloucester, Massachusetts, a town popular with many artists. He produced several notable works that year, including Tall Masts and Italian Quarter, Gloucester. Hopper returned to the town to paint several times over the next two decades. In February 1913, Hopper was encouraged to submit work to the Armory Show. The committee accepted his painting Sailing (1911), where it sold for $250. Hopper was 30 years old, and it was his first sale ever, and his last for the next ten years.

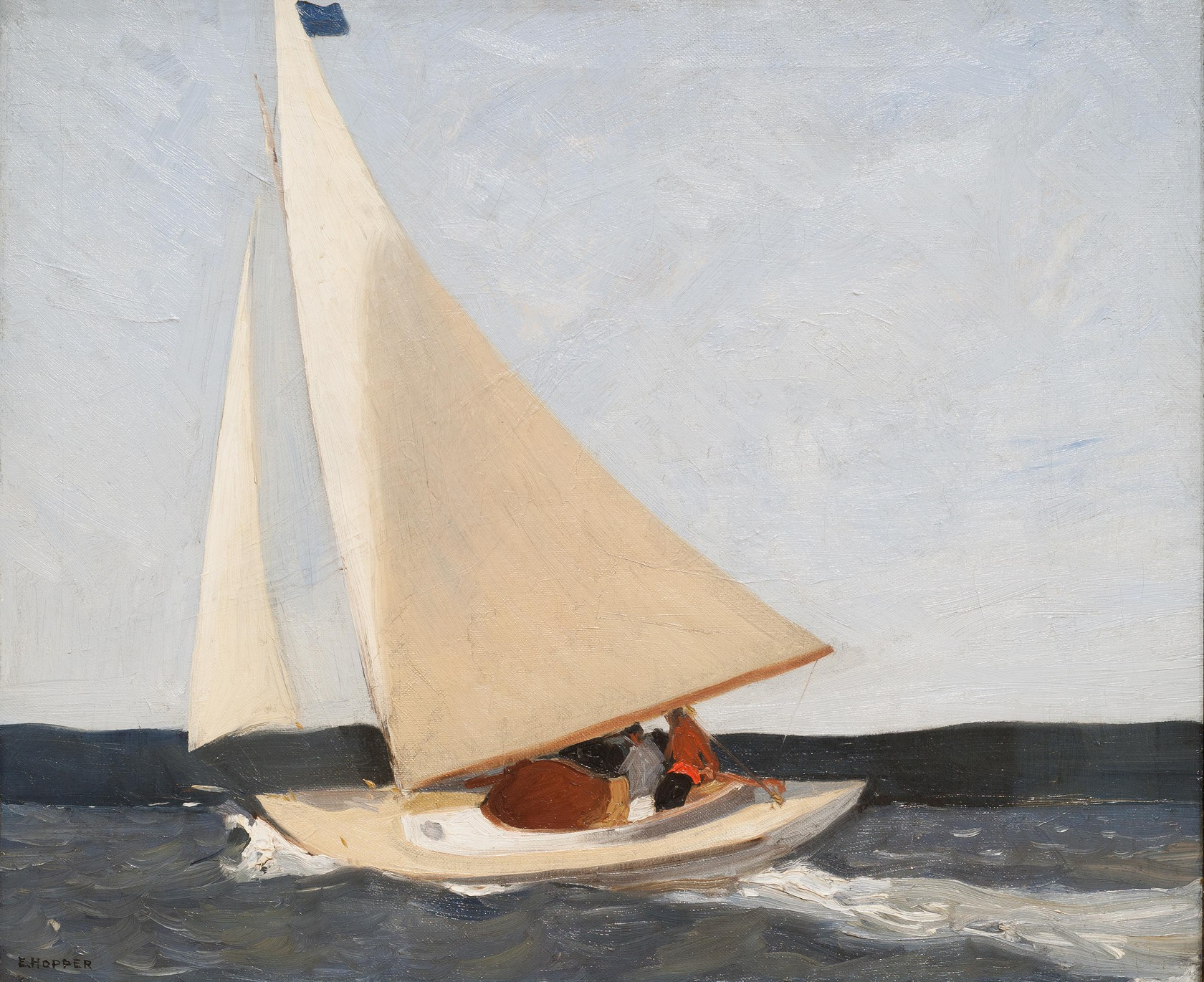
Sailing (1911)

In 1923, Hopper produced a series of successful watercolors in Gloucester leading to increasing recognition of his art. The best of the series, The Mansard Roof, featured a Victorian house with a mansard roof, a style of house he had previously painted in 1909 while in Paris (Le Pavillon de Flore, Le Pont Royal). Josephine Nivison (Jo), Hopper's fellow pupil from art school, was impressed by his work. That year, the Brooklyn Museum invited Jo to show her watercolors in November. Before the show, she convinced the curator to consider Hopper's work for the exhibition as well. It was agreed, with the museum showing six of Hopper's watercolors next to her own. The Mansard Roof stole the show, received critical acclaim, and was purchased by the museum, marking Hopper's second major sale.

The next year, Hopper married Jo; they spent their honeymoon in Gloucester, visiting yet again in 1928. Notable nautical works during his early period in the 1920s include Bow of Beam Trawler (1923), Two Trawlers (1923–1924), and The Bootleggers (1925). Although Hopper developed a preference for painting architectural subjects such as buildings and structures, nautical motifs continued to play a role in Hopper's work for the remainder of his life. Hopper produced dozens of paintings focusing on seascapes, maritime landscapes, rivers, bridges, bay views from houses, and the architecture of lighthouses and coastal towns in New England. Later in life, Jo made him give up sailing due to concerns about his safety.

== Development ==
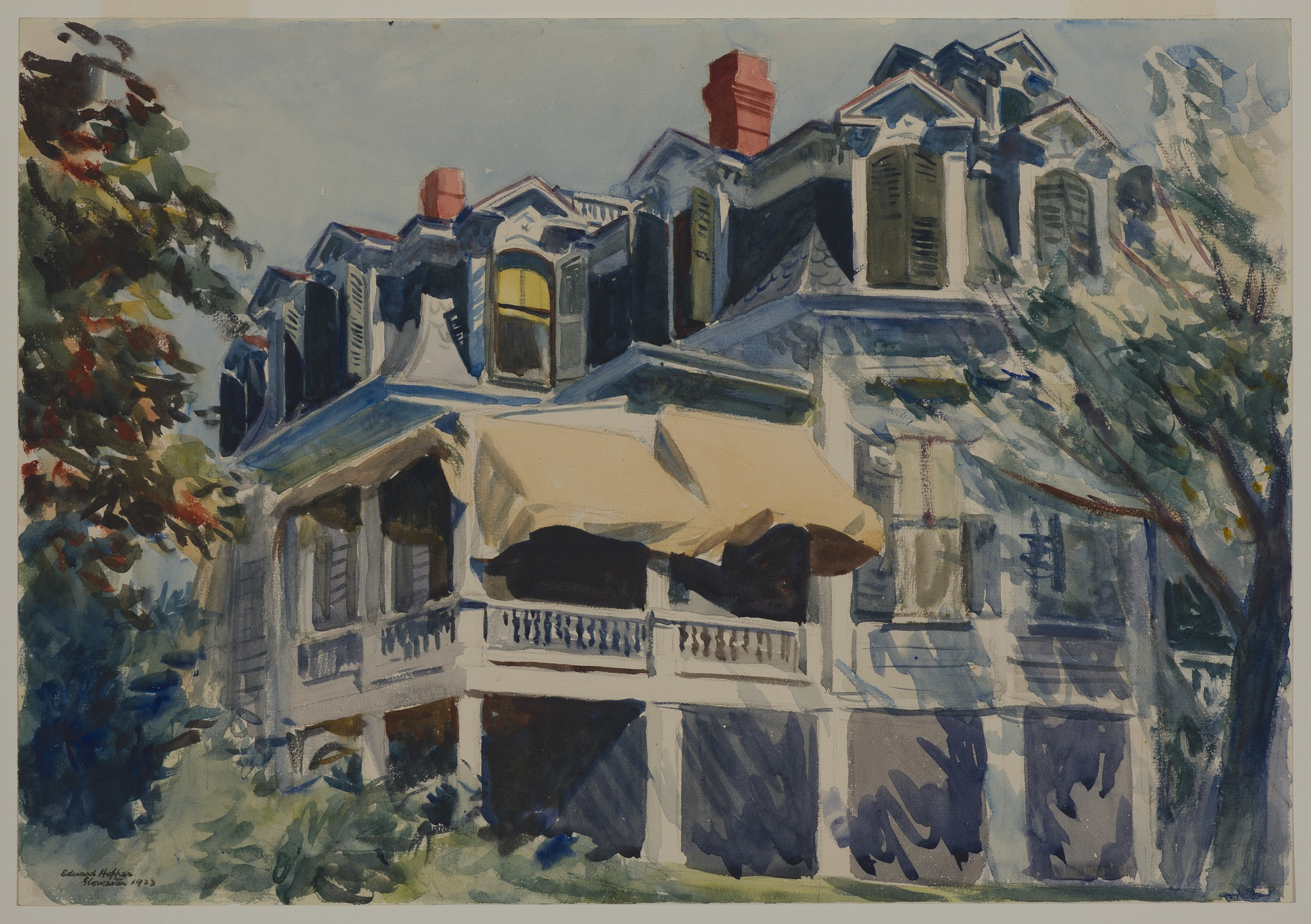
The Mansard Roof (1923)

By 1924, Hopper was finally able to devote himself full-time to his painting at the age of 42 and leave commercial work as an illustrator. 1925 was a major turning point for Hopper, demarcating the transition from his early period to his middle or mature style as an artist. The year began with the death of fellow Ashcan artist George Bellows (1882–1925), whose passing evoked a rare emotional response from Hopper. The experience led to a grief-stricken watercolor titled Day After the Funeral, showing two people dressed in black walking down a street on a frigid, winter day. Hopper began selling his first works to museums, with the Pennsylvania Academy of the Fine Arts purchasing Apartment Houses (1923) in March. Museums in London and New York soon followed.

By this time, Prohibition in the United States had been underway for the previous five years. Alcohol smuggling was common in the U.S., particularly along the New England coastline where rum-runners in their boats were often seen at dusk. The problem had increased to such a point that the United States Attorney General made an announcement in February publicly declaring the illegal actions of foreign ships helping the bootlegging industry, who waited off the coast for small boats to arrive and transfer the cargo to their holds. The smaller, faster boats would then secretly deliver the illegal alcohol to shore. Historian Joseph E. Garland later documented the practice of rum-running in Gloucester in the area near Cape Ann. According to art historian Gail Levin, these small boats, often known as "rummies", were used as the basis for the scene depicted in The Bootleggers. Hopper painted it at his Washington Square North studio in Greenwich Village, New York City.

== Composition ==
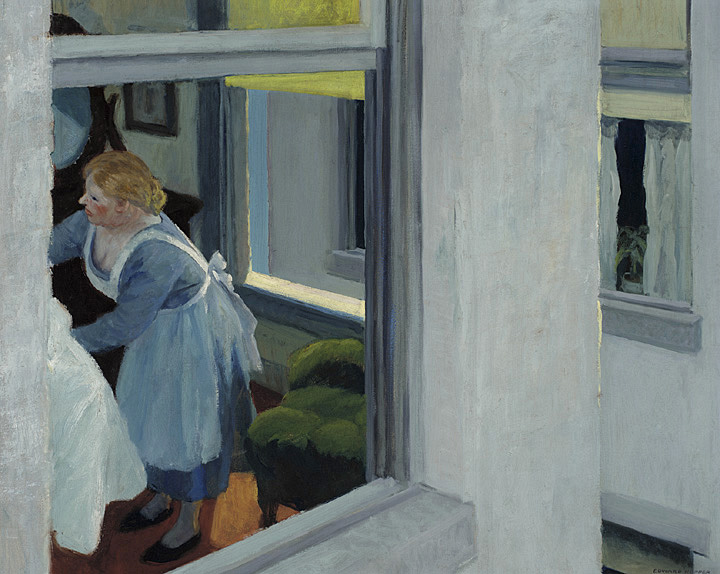
Apartment Houses (1923)

A motorboat navigates along the edge of a body of water in the relative darkness. Three men are in the boat, their backs turned, all staring towards the shore at a blue Victorian house with a mansard roof where a person appears to stare back at them, possibly a lookout. A sense of illegality permeates the scene. Trees appear in the background, but they are indistinct and blend together. In her ledger book where she made notes of every painting Hopper made, Jo notes the date as "1925 or late 1924", describing it as "very early A.M. Water & cloudy sky blue, white house, pale blue, roof dark, 3 red chimneys. Pale cement wall built on rocks, amber rock weed along edge of water. Ridge back of house dark dull green. 4 men (one left side of house) dull on dark business. Covers of port & starboard light red & green on bow." Art dealer John Clancy, who was managing the Rehn Gallery when the painting was sold in 1956, explained that the imagery depicted in The Bootleggers was based on a mixture of different scenes; it did not represent an actual place.

Hopper was drawn to architectural styles and subjects that had roots in both the 19th-century American style he grew up with as a child in Nyack, as well as the French architecture he witnessed while painting in Paris in the first decade of the 20th century. His interest in the former was partly due to a sense of nationalism that was flourishing at the time, but also to having visited Europe, allowing him to self-reflect and recognize the American style he had been surrounded with from the beginning. One of these elements, found both at home and abroad, was the mansard roof, which Hopper originally painted in Paris, but now at home was preoccupied with painting in Massachusetts, Maine, and the state of New York. He continued to return to the mansard roof throughout the 1920s, most notably in paintings like The Mansard Roof (1923), Haskell's House (1924), and The Bootleggers. The mansard roof also featured prominently in his next painting, House by the Railroad (1925), the first work in his fully mature style, and Talbot's House (1926) a year later. Hopper later returned to a similar scene featuring a motorboat in Maine in Fog (1926–1929) and Blackwell's Island (1928). More than two decades after The Bootleggers, Hopper recalled the 1920s, Prohibition-era theme one more time, but in a far more subtle way, this time with Seven A.M. (1948), a painting of an innocuous storefront thought to represent an illegal speakeasy.

== Exhibitions and provenance ==
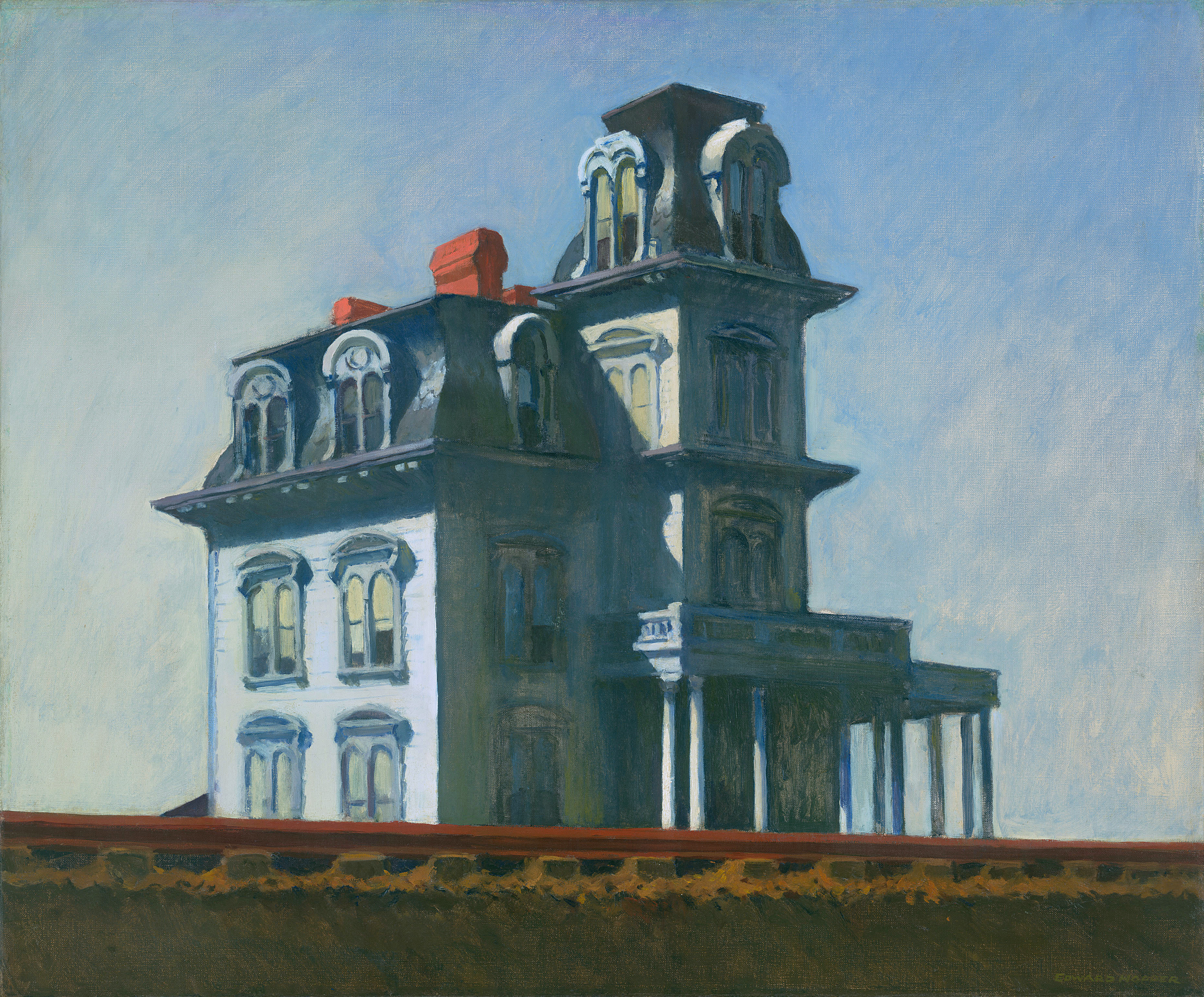
House by the Railroad (1925)

The Bootleggers was exhibited four times in the late 1920s: in 1925, 1926, 1927, and 1928. Shortly after its creation, the Brooklyn Museum featured it in the Paintings in Oil by American and European Artists exhibition, which ran from late November 1925 to early January 1926. By the end of that month, it was displayed again alongside Hopper's prints from late January to mid-February 1926 in the Exhibition of Tri-National Art, which toured Paris, London, New York City, and Germany. In 1927, Hopper's art dealer, Frank Knox Morton Rehn, showcased the painting at his gallery. The following year, it appeared at the Twenty-second Annual Exhibition of Selected Paintings by American Artists at the Buffalo Fine Arts Academy, from late April to late June 1928.

Hopper stored the painting in his Washington Square studio for almost 30 years. Decades later, in November 1955, photographer Sidney J. Waintrob arrived at Hopper's studio to take photos for the then upcoming January 1956 article about Hopper in American Artist magazine by Jacob Getlar Smith. With all of his current paintings on display at the gallery, Hopper pulled The Bootleggers out of his archives and posed next to it on the easel. Hopper then quipped to Waintrob that he would now have to sell it. Early that next year, the painting was acquired from the Rehn Gallery by Charles E. Buckley for the Currier Museum of Art.

== See also ==
- List of works by Edward Hopper
