= Second Story Sunlight =

Painting by Edward Hopper

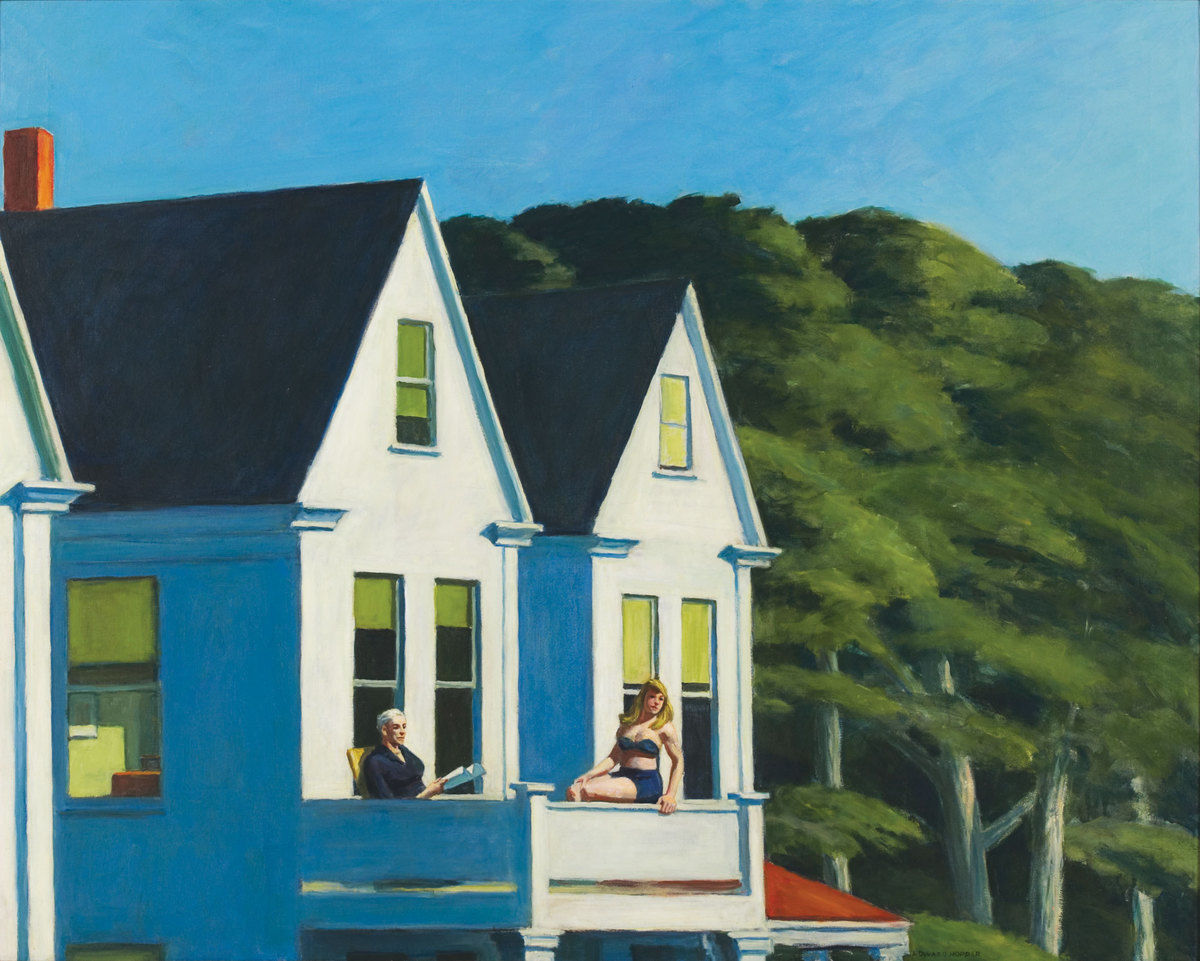
- Year: 1960
- Medium: Oil on canvas
- Dimensions: 100 cm (39 in) × 130 cm (51 in)
- Location: Whitney Museum of American Art, New York

Second Story Sunlight is a 1960 oil painting by the American artist Edward Hopper. It depicts two women of different ages on the second-story balcony of a white house. The older woman reads a newspaper while the younger woman sits on the railing. It is in the collections of the Whitney Museum of American Art, in New York.

Hopper described the painting to Katharine Kuh as one of his personal favorites.

== Creation ==
According to Hopper, the painting was "an attempt to paint sunlight as white with almost no yellow pigment in the white", and "any psychological idea will have to be supplied by the viewer". Hopper's wife Josephine posed for both women in the picture. This was disputed by Hopper's neighbors, Marie Stephens and her adolescent daughter Kim, who argued that the young woman must have been based on one of them, citing the depicted woman's bust size. The painting was finished on September 15, 1960.

== See also ==
- List of works by Edward Hopper
