= Saltillo Mansion =

1943 painting by Edward Hopper

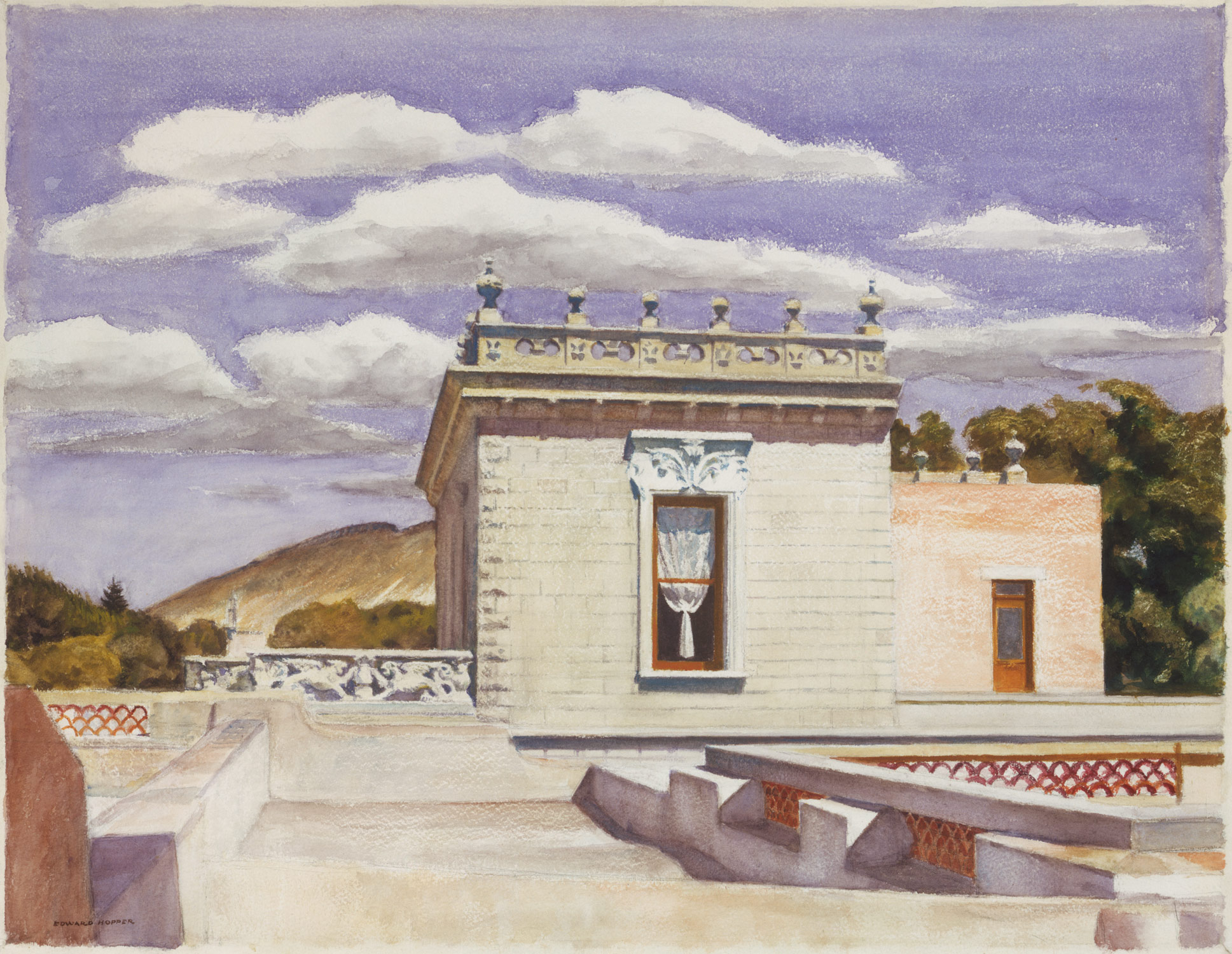
- Artist: Edward Hopper
- Year: 1943
- Medium: Watercolor
- Movement: American Realism
- Subject: Mansion on Victoria Street, Saltillo
- Dimensions: 21 1/4 x 27 1/8 in. (54 x 68.9 cm)
- Location: Metropolitan Museum of Art, New York

Saltillo Mansion is a 1943 watercolor painting by the American Realist artist Edward Hopper. The work depicts a Neoclassical, Spanish Revival manse in Saltillo, Mexico, from the rooftop of his residence. For the summer of 1943, Hopper and his wife resided in Saltillo, first having stationed for a while in Mexico City.

== See also ==
- List of works by Edward Hopper
