= Coast Guard Station, Two Lights, Maine =

1927 painting by Edward Hopper

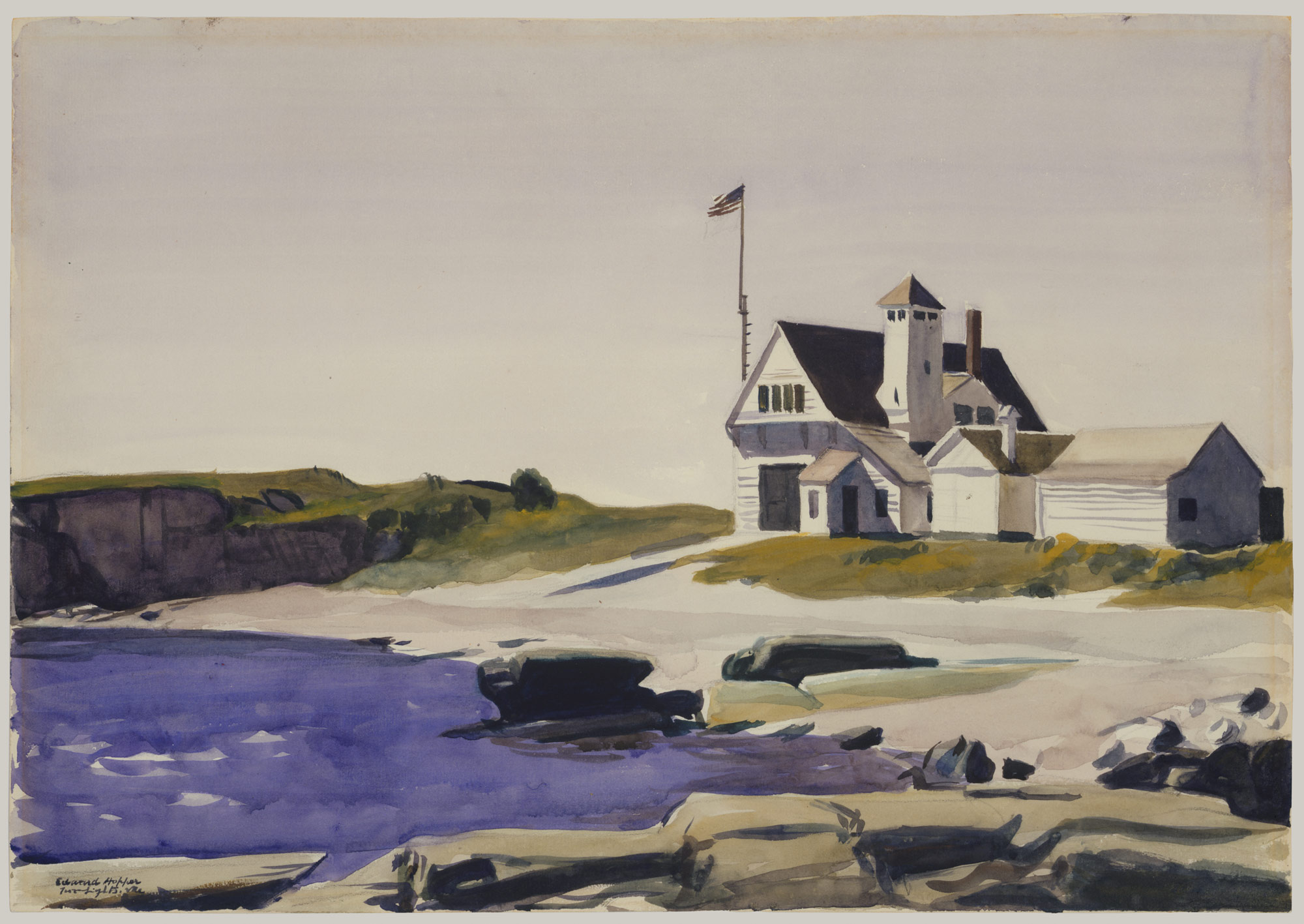
- Artist: Edward Hopper
- Year: 1927
- Movement: American Realism
- Subject: Cape Elizabeth Lights
- Dimensions: 13 7/8 x 19 7/8 in. (35.2 x 50.5 cm)
- Location: Metropolitan Museum of Art, New York

Coast Guard Station, Two Lights, Maine is a 1927 painting by the American Realist artist Edward Hopper. The mediums used were gouache, watercolor, and charcoal on paper. The work depicts the Cape Elizabeth Lights, a frequent subject of Hopper and wife's frequent summer visits to Cape Elizabeth, Maine. It is held in the Metropolitan Museum of Art, in New York.

== See also ==
- List of works by Edward Hopper
- 1927 in art
