= Ground Swell =

1939 painting by Edward Hopper

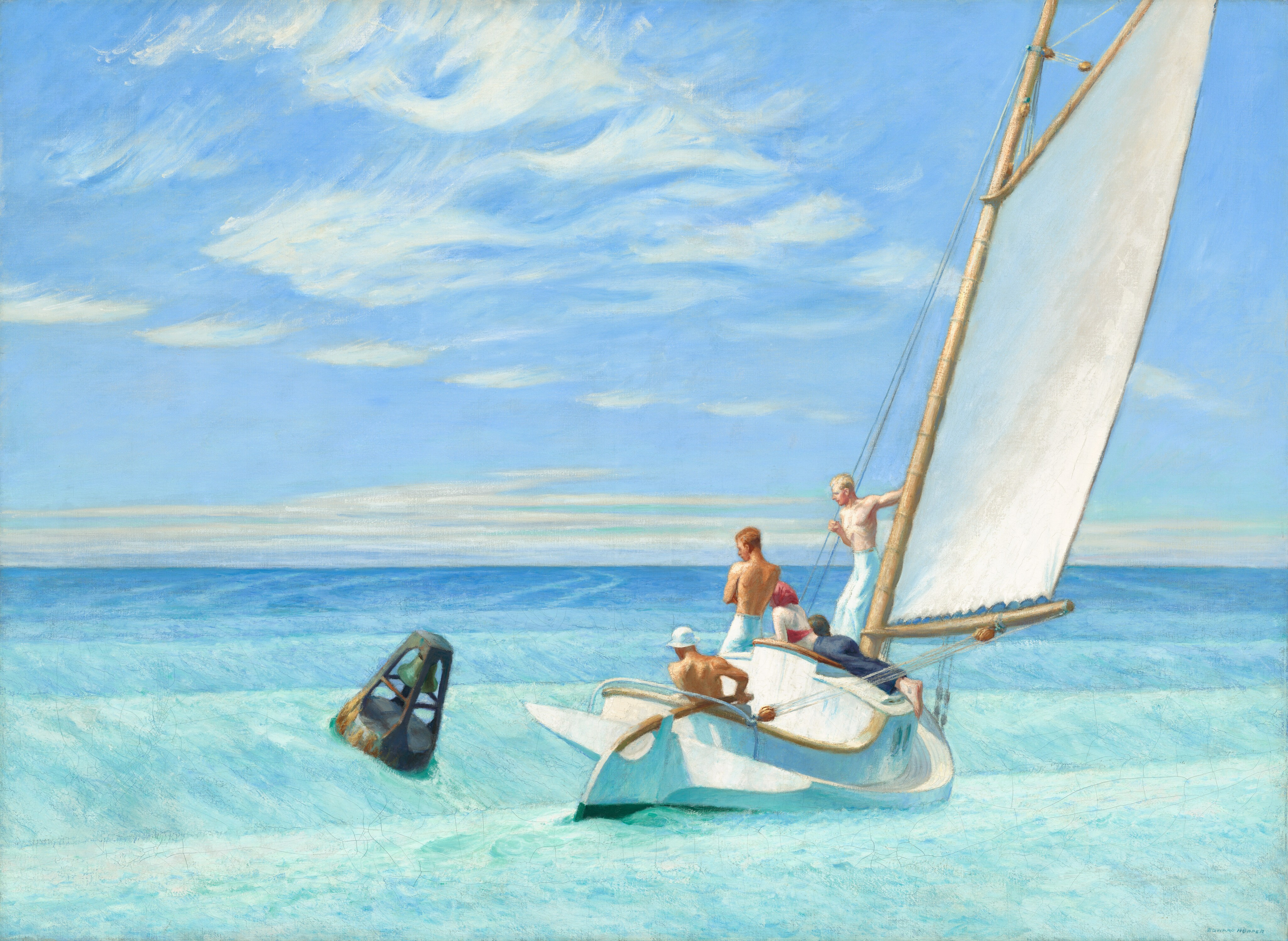
- Artist: Edward Hopper
- Year: 1939
- Medium: oil paint, canvas
- Dimensions: 91.92 cm (36.19 in) × 127.16 cm (50.06 in)
- Location: National Gallery of Art
- Accession no.: 2014.79.23

Ground Swell is a 1939 painting by American artist Edward Hopper which depicts five people on a heeling catboat in a light swell, looking at an ominous buoy. It was in the collection of the Corcoran Gallery of Art from 1943 until it was purchased by the National Gallery of Art in Washington, D.C. in 2014. Several preparatory studies are held by the Whitney Museum of American Art in New York City.

== Description ==
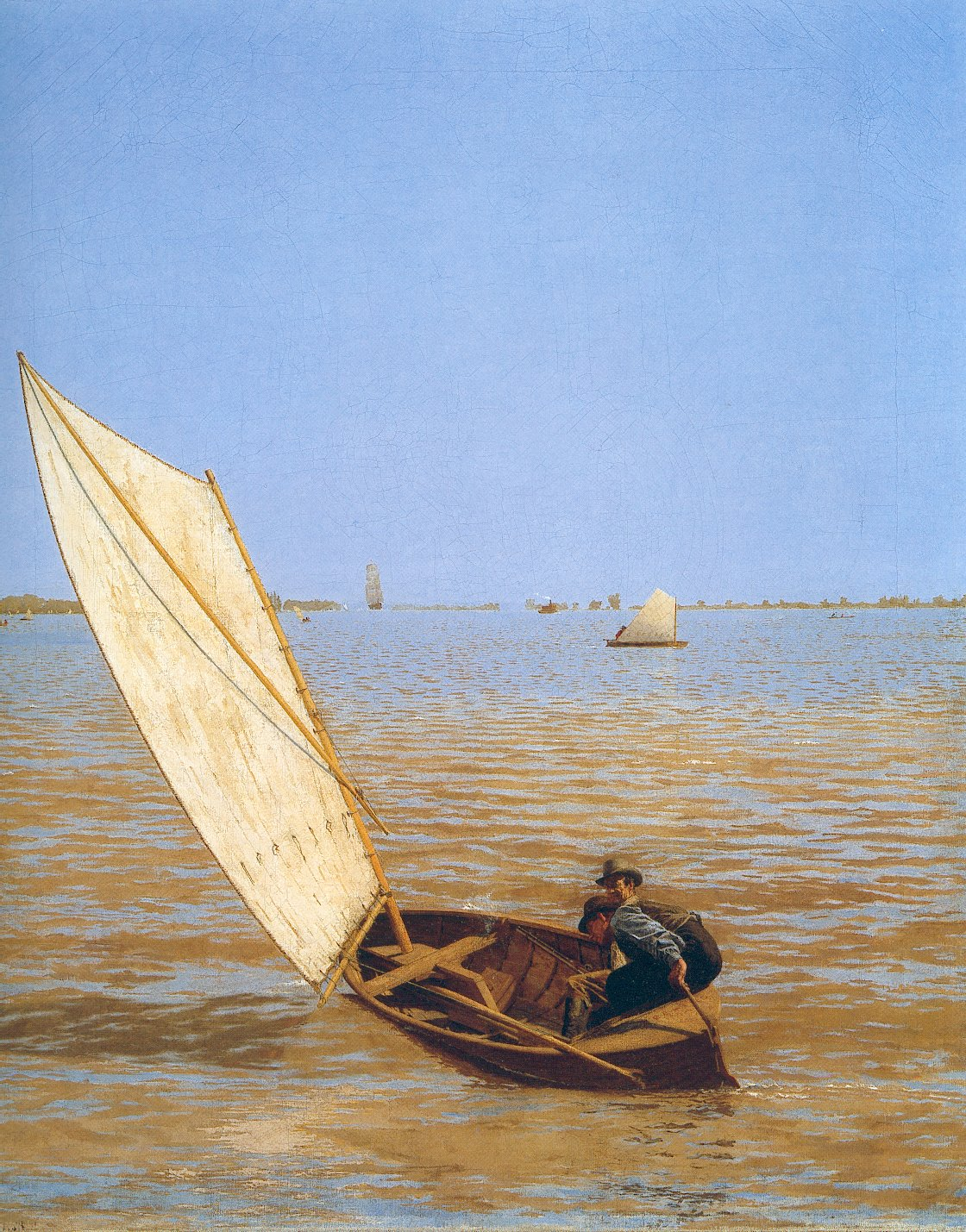
Thomas Eakins, Starting Out after Rail, 1874, Museum of Fine Arts, Boston

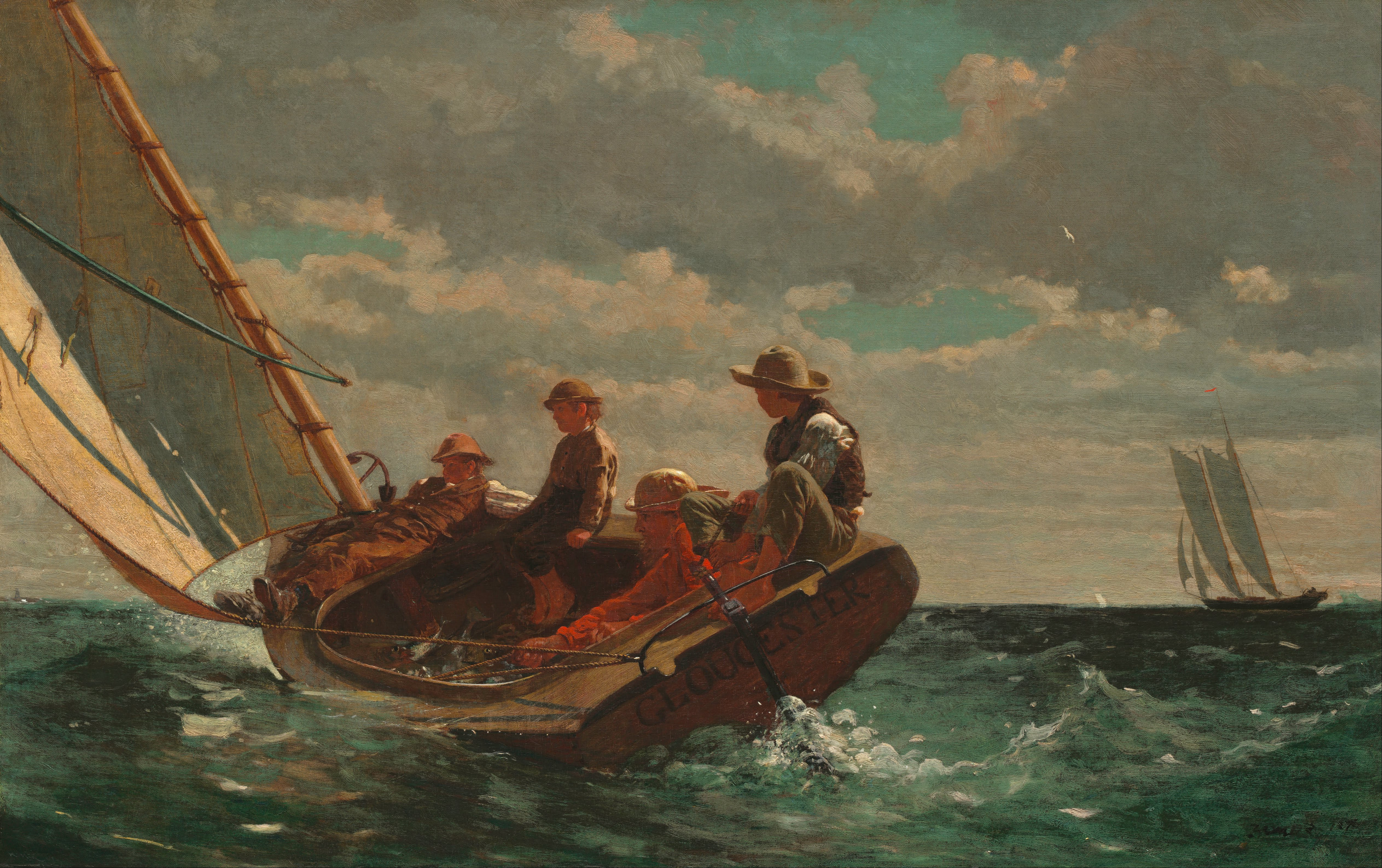
Winslow Homer, Breezing Up (A Fair Wind), 1873–1876, National Gallery of Art

The painting depicts a group of young people in a boat caught in the titular ocean swell. The bright sunlit exhibits Hopper's enthusiasm for the sea, which can also be found in his other nautical paintings and seascapes – most notably his paintings of New England lighthouses such as Lighthouse Hill (1927) and The Long Leg (1930). However, a sense of isolation pervades all of these paintings. In Ground Swell specifically, the loneliness of the boat and the rather ominous presence of a buoy signify themes of impending doom. National Gallery of Art (NGA) curator Adam Greenhalgh writes that the painting possibly references the beginning of World War II, which occurred while Hopper was working on Ground Swell.

The boat is sailing on a sunlit sea, with three passengers, two men and a woman, and another man at the tiller. The men are topless, with long white slacks; the woman wears a red kerchief over her hair, and a red halter top with dark slacks. The people pay no attention to each other as they are all focused on an ominous bell buoy bobbing on the rolling waves. The blue-green buoy with brown seaweed is the only dark feature in a scene dominated by bright blues and whites, its clanging bell warning of imminent but hidden dangers. Cirrus clouds in the sky herald an approaching storm hinted by the dark line of the horizon, perhaps influenced by Hopper's experience during the 1938 New England hurricane the previous year.

The composition, with a heeling catboat, is similar to Thomas Eakins's 1874 Starting Out after Rail and Winslow Homer's 1873–1876 Breezing Up (A Fair Wind). Homer's painting was made a few years after the end of the American Civil War, with the crew of the boat optimistically looking to the horizon: in Hopper's work, the scene of tranquility contains notes of peril.

Before executing Ground Swell, Hopper made a number of preparatory studies, some of which are now in the Whitney Museum of American Art. Compositionally, the sketches are the same, but Whitney museum curator Carter Foster notes that there were small variations between the sketches, such as cropping and level of detail, that were synthesized in the final work.

Hopper used a medium-weight plain-weave "Winton" canvas, with a grain that makes it suitable for landscapes and seascapes, commercially pre-primed with a thin layer of cream paint. Graphite squaring-off lines suggest it was scaled up from an earlier drawing or photograph. The paint is applied thinly in many areas, but the sea is painted with many thick layers through which Hopper dragging his brush, and the white sail was thickly applied with a palette knife. The rigging was added in graphite pencil.

== Provenance ==
Hopper painted the work at his studio in Truro, Massachusetts, in August and September 1939. His daybook records he completed it on September 15, 1939. The completed work was exhibited at the Eighteenth Biennial Exhibition of Contemporary American Oil Paintings at the Corcoran Gallery of Art in 1943, for which Hopper was a juror. It was acquired from the exhibition by the Corcoran and remained there until the gallery was dissolved in 2014. Ground Swell was purchased by the NGA with the William A. Clark fund. The painting is currently part of the NGA's Corcoran Collection.

== Legacy ==
Hopper's painting became the subject of a lecture and an article by Stanford University professor Alexander Nemerov, both titled Ground Swell: Edward Hopper in 1939. In the lecture and the article, Nemerov examines Ground Swell's connections with the political and cultural events of 1939, as well as the personal significance of the painting for Hopper. Nemerov's lecture was held in 2007 with funding from the Wyeth Foundation for American Art, while the article was featured in the 2008 fall volume of the journal American Art.

== See also ==
- List of works by Edward Hopper
