= White River at Sharon =

1937 painting by Edward Hopper

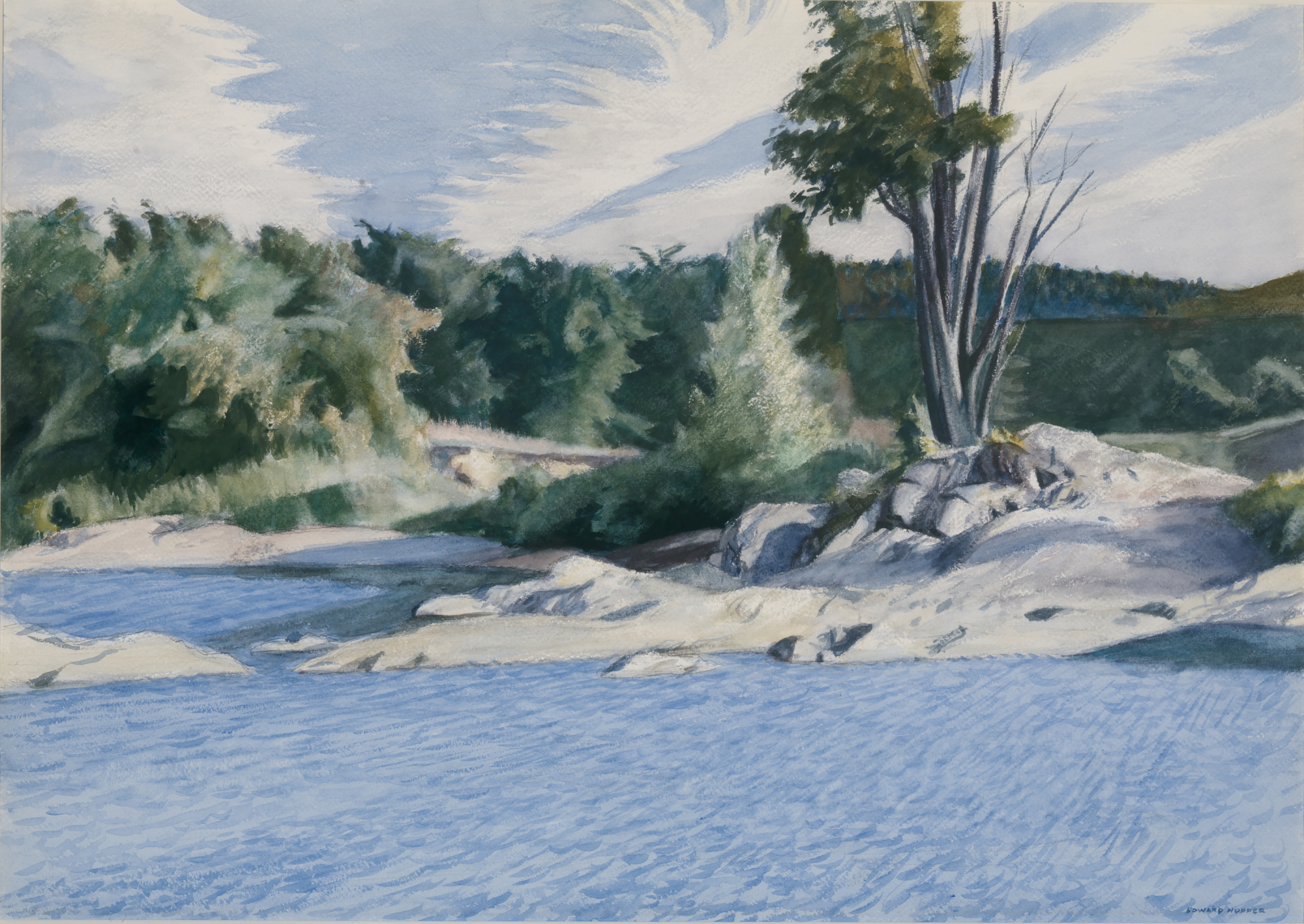
- Artist: Edward Hopper
- Year: 1937
- Completion date: <
- Movement: American Realism
- Subject: White River (Vermont)
- Dimensions: 30 5/8 x 50 1/2 in. (77.8 x 128.3 cm) framed: 37 1/4 x 57 1/4 x 3 in. (94.6 x 145.4 x 7.6 cm)
- Location: Smithsonian American Art Museum, Washington, D.C.
- Owner: Smithsonian, gifted by Sara Roby

White River at Sharon is a 1937 watercolor painting by the American Realist artist Edward Hopper. It was painted in September 1937 while Hopper and his wife were visiting friends on their farm in Sharon, Vermont. It is held in the Smithsonian American Art Museum, in Washington, D.C.

== See also ==
- List of works by Edward Hopper
