= Manhattan Bridge Loop =

1928 painting by Edward Hopper

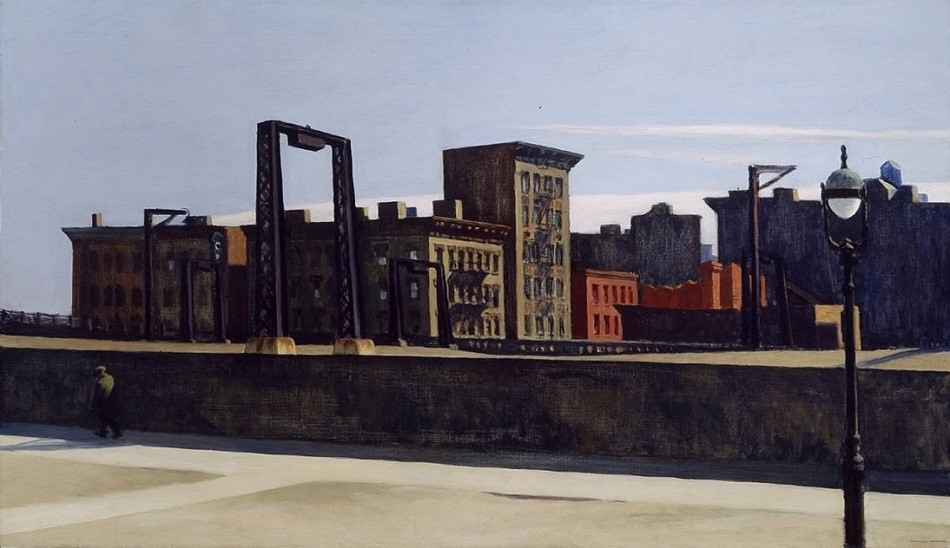
- Artist: Edward Hopper
- Year: 1928
- Dimensions: 88.9 cm (35.0 in)
- Location: United States
- Accession no.: 1932.17

Manhattan Bridge Loop is a 1928 oil painting by American artist Edward Hopper, depicting the Manhattan Bridge in New York City. It is on display in the Addison Gallery of American Art of the Phillips Academy in Andover, Massachusetts, which received the painting as a gift from art collector Stephen Carlton Clark in 1932.

When the Addison Gallery presented a special exhibition about the painting in 1939, Hopper provided a statement and drawings for the show. Art historian Avis Berman has identified this painting as a significant example of how Hopper's paintings have affected the way people see New York City. Critic Jackie Wullschlager has described it as a "sombre masterpiece", "an industrial cityscape with a lone flâneur casting his long shadow on an empty sidewalk".

== See also ==
- List of works by Edward Hopper
