= Room in New York =

1932 painting by Edward Hopper

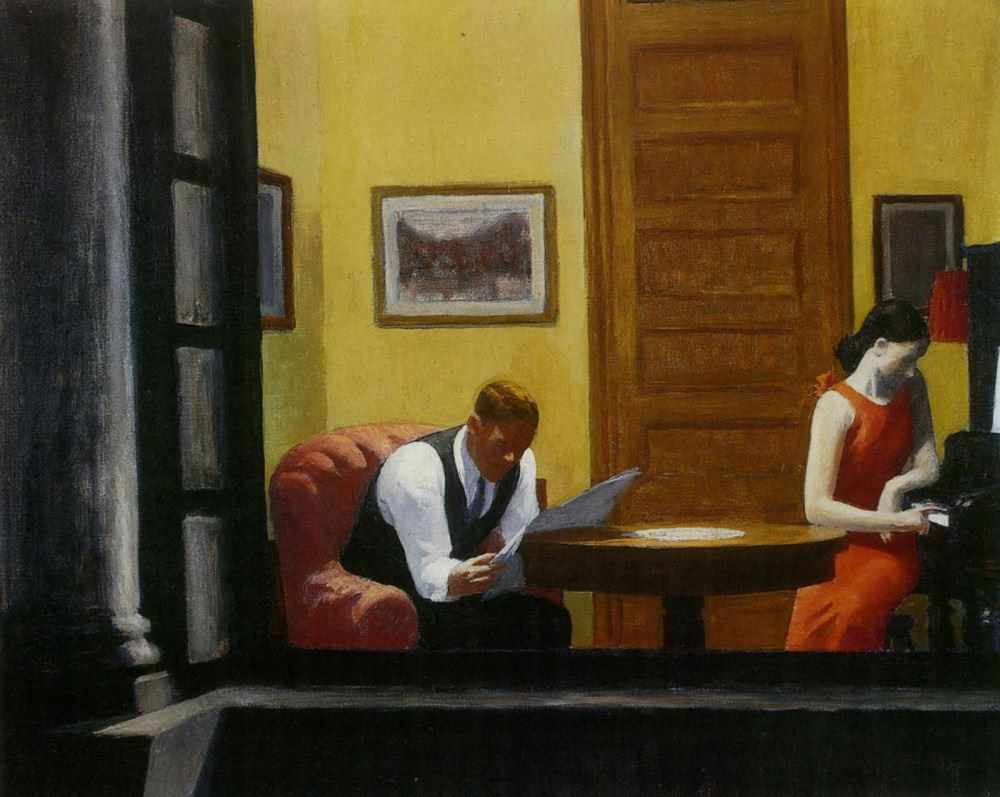
- Year: 1932
- Dimensions: 73.66 cm (29.00 in) × 93.03 cm (36.63 in)

Room in New York is a 1932 oil-on-canvas painting by the American artist Edward Hopper that portrays two individuals in a New York City flat. It is held in the collection of the Sheldon Museum of Art. The painting is said to have been inspired by the glimpses of lighted interiors seen by the artist near the district where he lived in Washington Square.

== Formal qualities ==
The scene of a brightly lit room is contained within the dark sill of a window. The stark framing makes the room the main focus, drawing the eye and giving realness to the action of peeping into a space where the subjects are unaware they are being watched. The genuineness of spying is a product of Hopper’s artistic process. He admitted the inspiration for Room in New York came from "glimpses of lighted interiors seen as I walked along city streets at night." Despite the snapshot-esque quality of the scene, it is actually no one particular window or moment Hopper peered into but rather a culmination of many different narratives he saw as he roamed New York City. The act of peering gives the viewer the sense that what is being seen is wholly real and unfiltered; “the self-absorbed figures do not know of his presence; otherwise, they would be embarrassed, startled, or otherwise uncomfortable.” Thus, the narrative Hopper portrays is one of unapologetic realness. The harsh lines and blocks of color that frame the scene not only divide the space between viewer and subject but also divide space within the room itself. Hopper places a door almost exactly center to divide the work into two distinct halves horizontally, isolating the man and the woman into their respective sides. While the man reads the newspaper, his counterpart plays the piano with her back to him. Blocks of color delineate space and suggest a lack of movement. Art historian and scholar Jean Gillies argues that the less details the viewer has to look at, the slower the eye will move across the work. The idea comes from the notion that when viewing a work of art, the eye jumps from detail to detail in order to perceive the whole. By reducing the number of elements, Hopper creates a slow moving or even still scene. Gilles argues the formal techniques function to give the subjects a timeless quality as if they are frozen in that instant.

== Interpretations ==
A majority of scholars focus on loneliness and alienation as the theme of Hopper's work. Art historian Pamela Koob points out that the "solitary figures in Hopper’s paintings may well be evocations of such contented solitude rather than the loneliness so often cited." The evidence for contentedness comes from Hopper’s own notion that a work of art is an expression of the creator’s "inner life". According to his wife Jo Hopper, he loved his inner life to the point that he could "get on fine without the interruption from other humans."

In addition to the main theme of alienation, a variety of other factors are highlighted in Hopper's work. Hopper himself describes it as, “you know, there are many thoughts, many impulses that go into a picture, not just one". Some scholars have asserted that Hopper’s clearly defined shapes and figures might be a relic of his previous work in advertising. While it was well known Hopper gave himself very little credit when talking about his longtime work as a book and magazine illustrator, some of the formal qualities seen in commercial work tend to appear in his oil paintings. Specifically, art historian Linda Nochlin argues that Hopper still held on to "vestiges of its figural conventions, its spatial shorthand, and its coy puritan stiffness of contour." These rigid formalities in regard to shape are what Nochlin argues gives Hopper’s work an undeniably American look.

== In context ==
The feeling of separation often connected to the New York City flat is a running theme in Hopper’s work. In particular, Hopper’s pieces that contain two main subjects cut deep to the idea of loneliness. Hopper’s couples tend to be a man and woman in close proximity and yet completely oblivious to one another. While these estranged pairs appear in many of Hopper’s works, art historian Joseph Stanton suggests that Hotel by a Railroad (1952) might be something of a companion piece to Room in New York. Stanton points out the couple by the railroad might actually be the same couple in Room in New York, just three or four decades older. In both works, the dresses the women wear are the same color and the extremely dark hair and pale skin furthers the likeness between them. Likewise, the men in both paintings wear black suits without the jacket. Beyond the physical similarities of the two couples, the notion of physical closeness yet complete alienation ties the two works together.

== In popular culture ==
The painting inspired a 2016 short story by Stephen King, "The Music Room". The story was collected in the 2016 book In Sunlight or In Shadow: Stories Inspired by the Paintings of Edward Hopper.

A print of this same work is seen in King’s YouTube reading of an excerpt from a story in his collection “You Like It Darker”

== See also ==
- List of works by Edward Hopper
