= Gas (Hopper) =

1940 painting by Edward Hopper

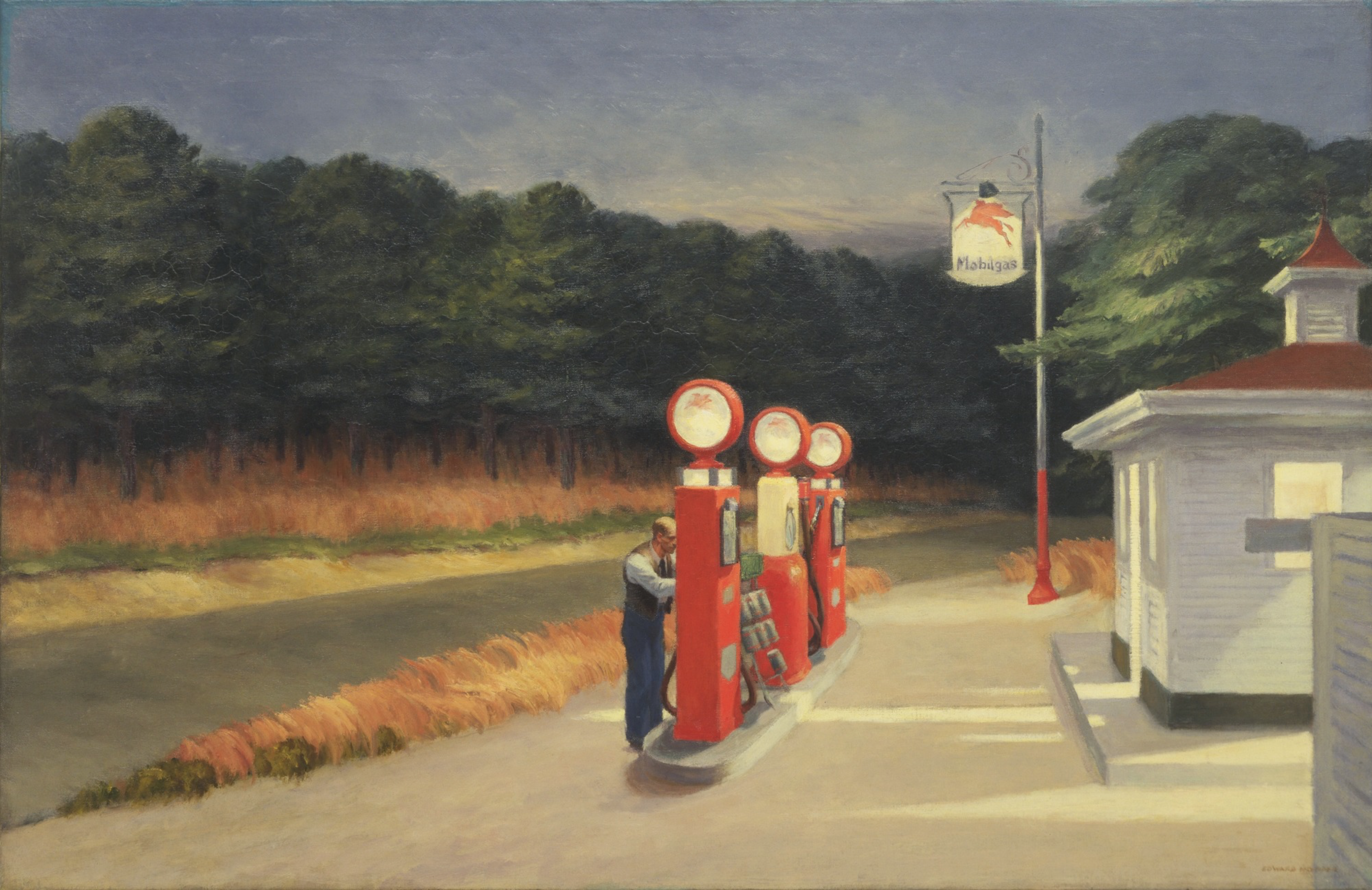
- Artist: Edward Hopper
- Year: 1940
- Catalogue: 80000
- Medium: Oil on canvas
- Dimensions: 66.7 cm × 102.2 cm (26 1/4 in × 40 1/4 in)
- Location: Museum of Modern Art; New York
- Accession: 577.1943

Gas is an oil painting executed in 1940 by the American painter Edward Hopper. It depicts an American gas station. The painting belongs to the Museum of Modern Art, in New York.

== History and description ==
The subject was a composite of several gas stations Hopper had visited. According to Hopper's wife Josephine, the gas station motif was something he had wanted to paint for a long time. Hopper struggled with the painting. He had begun to produce new paintings at a slower rate than before, and had trouble finding suitable gas stations to paint. Hopper wanted to paint a station with the lights lit above the pumps, but the stations in his area only turned the lights on when it was pitch dark outside, to save energy.

This painting depicts a Mobil gas station alongside a road, and a man alone working at a pump as evening falls. The lighting of the gas station contrasts with the arrival of night. The attendant's outfit (vest, white shirt, tie and clothes) as well as the lighting brings a kind of priestly aspect to the picture.

The painting also depicts details of the fuel pump, sign and electric lighting, and the dark gray asphalt road in perspective, opposing the nature present in the edge of a green pine forest, on the left, with tall yellow grass in front of it, the acacia visible beyond the station office, and the straw turning reddish on the edge of the roadway. This painting deviates from the painter's preliminary studies in many details.

Since 1927, the year when he acquired a Dodge and then traveled through the United States, the painter had made several paintings with the road as a recurring subject. The ambivalence between civilization and nature remains frequent in other similar Hopper's paintings, which ultimately represent neither the city nor the countryside.

== Provenance ==
The painting is in the Museum of Modern Art, in New York, due to the legacy of Mrs. Simon Guggenheim, in 1943.

== See also ==
- List of works by Edward Hopper
