= Office in a Small City =

American realist painting by Edward Hopper

- Artist: Edward Hopper
- Year: 1953
- Medium: oil paint, canvas
- Dimensions: 71.1 cm (28.0 in) × 101.6 cm (40.0 in)
- Location: Metropolitan Museum of Art
- Identifiers: The Met object ID: 488730

Office in a Small City is a 1953 oil painting by the American realist painter Edward Hopper. It is held by the Metropolitan Museum of Art, in New York.

== Description ==
The painting depicts a man sitting in a corner office surveying the cityscape outdoors. The painting depicts loneliness and beauty in a uniquely stark yet pleasing fashion, a common theme amongst Hopper's works. It was described by Hopper's wife, Josephine, as "the man in concrete wall."

== Analysis ==
Hopper commonly created compositions that have a voyeuristic perspective, depicted here from peering through the office window's at the working man inside.

New York City, the artist's home, was becoming a place for new immigrants to obtain jobs and the American Dream. During his lifetime, the city underwent tremendous development, both in terms of buildings and population. However, Hopper's depictions of New York remained small and largely unpopulated.

== See also ==
- List of works by Edward Hopper
