= House by the Railroad =

1925 painting by Edward Hopper

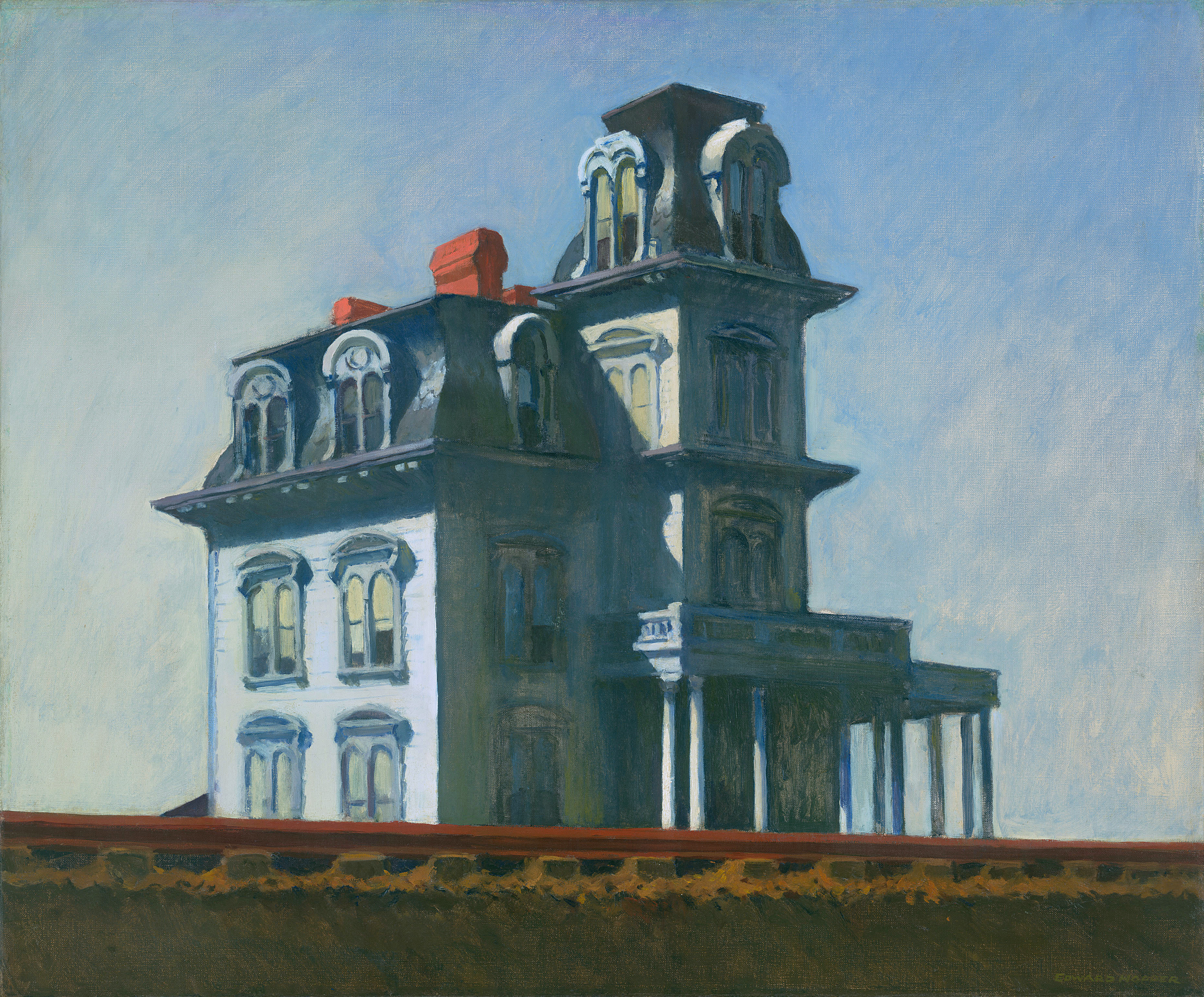
- Artist: Edward Hopper
- Year: 1925
- Catalogue: 78330
- Medium: Oil on canvas
- Subject: 49 Conger Avenue; Haverstraw, New York
- Location: Museum of Modern Art, New York City
- Accession: 3.1930

House by the Railroad is a 1925 oil-on-canvas painting by the American artist Edward Hopper.

== Background ==
The house that is said to have inspired the painting is a Second Empire style Victorian mansion in Haverstraw, New York, where it still stands today. The painting is reported to have influenced the Bates home in Alfred Hitchcock's Psycho, one of the homes in the 1956 film Giant directed by George Stevens, the home Charles Addams created for The Addams Family, and the house in Days of Heaven.

In 1929–30, the canvas was included in Paintings by 19 Living Americans, the Museum of Modern Art’s initial show solely of American art. MoMA acquired it in 1930, one of the inaugural pieces to become part of the then new art institution's holdings. The work was donated to the MoMA by the Singer sewing machine company heir, art collector, and philanthropist Stephen Clark.

== See also ==
- List of works by Edward Hopper
