= Hotel by a Railroad =

Painting by Edward Hopper

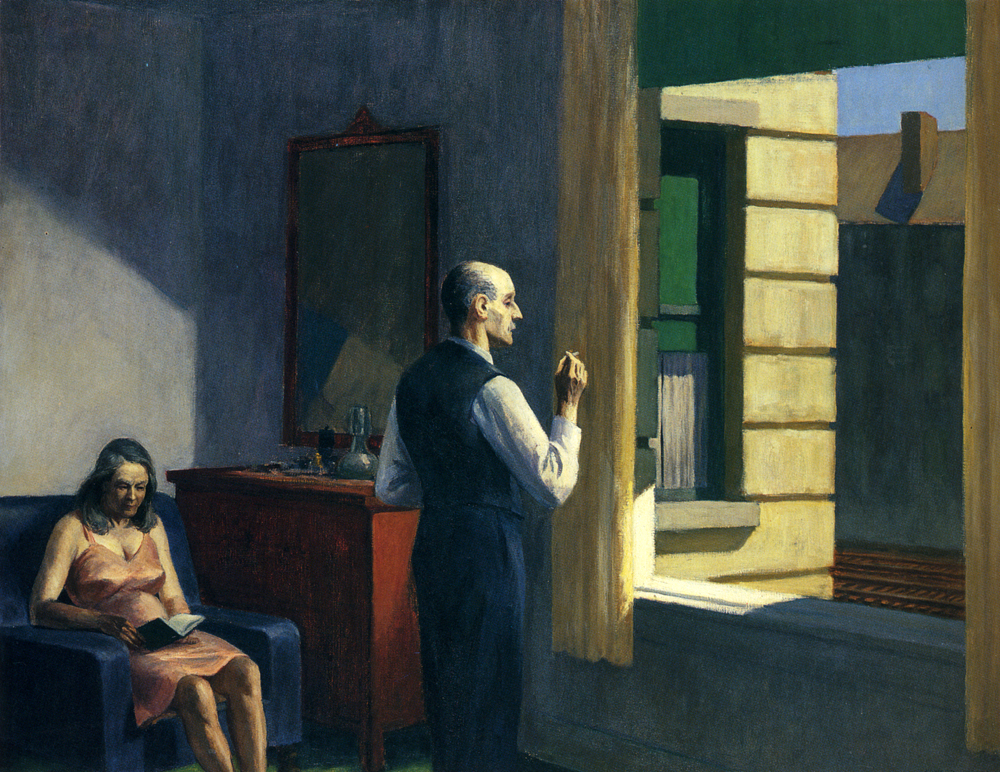
- Artist: Edward Hopper
- Year: 1952
- Dimensions: 79.4 cm (31.3 in) × 101.9 cm (40.1 in)

Hotel by a Railroad is a painting completed in 1952 by the American realist painter and printmaker Edward Hopper. The work is an oil on canvas, measuring 101.9 x 79.3 cm. It resides in the collection of the Hirshhorn Museum and Sculpture Garden.

== Description ==
The painting depicts a man and a woman, presumably a middle-aged couple, inside a room. The woman is seated at the left, reading a book, while the man is looking at the window. They both have grey hair; the man is bald, has a moustache, and is smoking a cigarette. The man and the woman do not look at each other, and they seem absorbed on their own interests. This simultaneously connects them, making them similar, and separates them, creating a barrier between the two. This is emphasized by the reduced perspective. Through the window, in the direction the man is looking, there is a wall and a closed window. In the mirror, at the left, which together with the window forms the center of the composition, nothing is visible except fuzzy reflections.

The woman's attention is focused on her book, while the man is looking on something outside that isn't visible. The painting depicts a complex interplay of dynamics, boundaries and surfaces.

== See also ==
- List of works by Edward Hopper
