= Hotel Lobby =

1943 painting by Edward Hopper

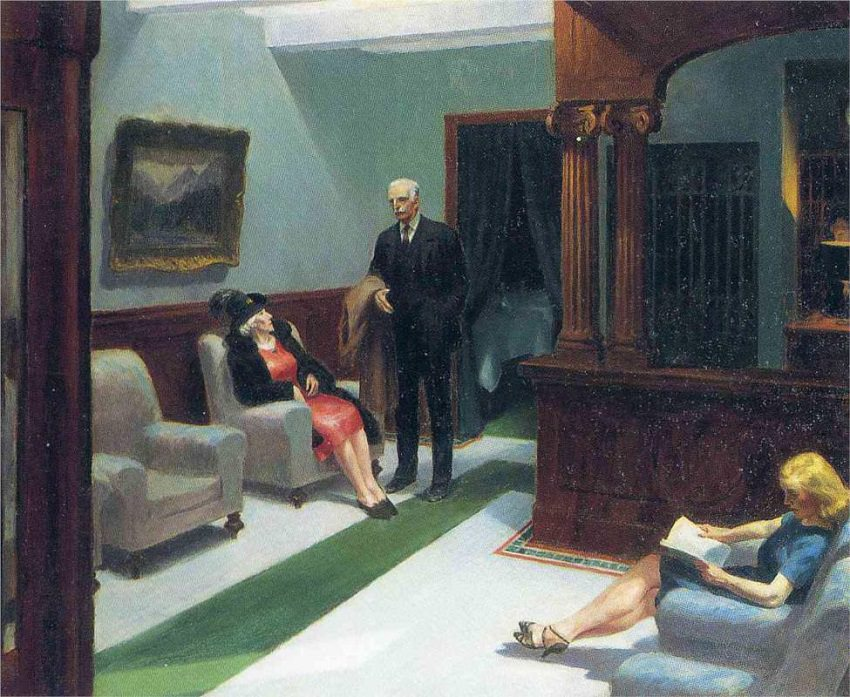
- Artist: Edward Hopper
- Year: 1943
- Medium: oil paint, canvas
- Dimensions: 81.9 cm (32.2 in) × 103.5 cm (40.7 in)
- Location: Indianapolis Museum of Art

Hotel Lobby is a 1943 oil painting on canvas by American realist painter Edward Hopper; it is held in the collection of the Indianapolis Museum of Art (IMA), in Indianapolis, Indiana, United States.

== Description ==
The painting depicts two women and a man in the lobby of a hotel. On the right is a woman with blond hair and a blue dress, sitting with her legs crossed and reading a book. To the left sits an older woman in a red dress, wearing a coat and a hat. A man stands next to her, facing forward, wearing a suit and holding an overcoat draped over his right arm. On the left wall, above the seated woman, is a framed landscape painting. A clerk behind the reception desk is barely visible in the shadows.

== Context ==
Hotel Lobby is a signature piece in Hopper's work, displaying his classic themes of alienation and brevity. The Hoppers traveled frequently, staying in many motels and hotels throughout his career. This is one of numerous works in his catalog that depict a hotel, such as Hotel Window, Western Motel, Hotel by a Railroad, Hotel Room etc. The older couple are believed to represent Hopper and his wife, at that date in their 60s. The hotel guests have been described as being "both traveling and suspended in time," reflecting a stoic and dramatic feeling, reminiscent of the film noir movies Hopper might have seen and the complex structure and feeling of works by Edgar Degas. The painting uses harsh light and rigid lines to create a "carefully constructed" uncomfortable environment. The elevated and theatrical vantage point of the painting may be derived from Hopper's love of Broadway theatre which he often watched from the balcony.

=== Sketches ===
Before he created the Hotel Lobby Hopper drew ten studies of the work, which were later given to the Whitney Museum of American Art by the estate of his wife, Josephine. Nine of the ten studies are described as:

- Study one was believed to have been executed while Hopper in a hotel lobby observed two seated figures separated by a lamp and table. That wall features a curtained opening, a registration desk and a painting on the wall with the stairwell and railing on the left.
- Study two lacks the table and lamp and includes a second painting, which is separated from the other by a wall sconce, and one figure.
- Study three depicts the stairwell being moved into the background. A figure believed to be male stands in the open doorway to the left of the stairs while a woman sits to the left of the doorway with an empty chair, a painting on the wall and a tiled floor.
- Study four is more refined and has greater detail. The stairs are now removed with three people on the left: two seated figures next to a standing man. The rear doorway has a curtain, columns are on the reception desk, the ceiling appears to be beamed, a second painting is on the wall and a stripe is added to the floor.
- Study five is double sided. One side appears to be an abandoned diagram of a room. The reverse side shows the room with a more detailed revolving door and a return to a single, framed painting on the wall. The reception desk columns are more detailed, and the stripe on the floor is darkened.
- Study six is missing the seated figure from the left with only three remaining and in more detail. The figures and the elevator are in their final locations.
- Study seven shows the fourth figure reappearing by the couple. The ceiling, desk, revolving door, curtained doorway and elevator all have greater detail. The couple also appears to be having a conversation.
- Study eight was created to further detail the older woman's clothing and hands, showing her with a gold glove.
- Study nine is a partial sketch of the younger woman who is reading, which shares the page with sketch eight, in greater detail. Until this sketch the other seated figure was a man.

These studies show the older couple communicating, only to cease their conversation in the final painting and the reading man is replaced with a blonde young woman reading in the final painting. The modeling for both women in the painting was done by his wife Josephine. After their marriage in 1920 she insisted on being the model for all of his female figures.

The coat the older woman wears is based on a fur coat owned by Hopper's wife, a coat she often wore to openings and a rare find in the Hopper's frugal household.

The red dress that the older woman wears (that Jo, in her journal, describes as "coral") signifies anger and extroversion, while the blue dress worn by the younger woman shows youth and distance. Throughout Hopper's sketches the clerk does not appear until the final painting. Under X-ray it can be seen that Hopper did little to change the canvas once he began work. Most alterations were made in the position of the young woman's head and in outlines of some areas in dark blue paint. A partial underdrawing was found but little detail remains.

Hopper was known to model for himself for figures, as in Nighthawks, leading some to believe he may have modeled for the male figure in Hotel Lobby.

One of the few paintings by Hopper to lack windows, Hotel Lobby uses light from the revolving door and an unseen area from between the ceiling beams.

== Reception ==
In 1945 Hopper was awarded the Logan Medal of the Arts and a $500 honorarium for Hotel Lobby. The painting was chosen by a jury composed of Juliana Force, then director of the Whitney Museum, and artists Raphael Soyer and Reginald Marsh. In regards to the painting, Chicago critic C.J. Bulliet stated that "Mr. Hopper is getting a little lazy about the excellent formula he has hit. Hotel Lobby is typical Hopper, but Hopper that has lost something of its kick." The artwork has been compared to Hopper's earlier work Summer Interior (1909), a work that helped to create Hopper's signature style; an intimate setting, simple lines and geometry, flat color usage and moody light. A shadowy figure and a sensual woman each make another visit in Hotel Lobby as seen in Summer Interior.

== Ownership and exhibition history ==
The painting was in the collection of Henry Hope from Bloomington, Indiana.

From June until December 2006 the Whitney Museum, which has the largest holding of Hopper's works in the world, displayed Hotel Lobby alongside their own works and key loans such as Nighthawks (1942) and New York Movie (1939). Hotel Lobby is currently on display in the Indianapolis Museum of Art's American Scene Gallery. In 2008 the IMA exhibited the work alongside the ten studies on loan from the Whitney in Edward Hopper: Paper to Paint, which ran until January 2009.

=== Publications ===
In 1996 Hotel Lobby was used as the paperback cover for the book Hotel Paradise by Martha Grimes. The painting also appears in City Limits: Crime, consumer culture and the urban experience by Keith Hayward.
