= Sun in an Empty Room =

1963 painting by Edward Hopper

- Year: 1963
- Dimensions: 73 cm (29 in) × 100.3 cm (39.5 in)
- Location: Private collection Washington, D.C.

Sun in an Empty Room is a 1963 painting by American realist Edward Hopper (1882–1967). Created during his late period at his Cape Cod summer home and studio in South Truro, Massachusetts, the painting was completed just four years prior to his death at the age of 84. The work depicts a room, seemingly empty, illuminated by sunlight coming through a window, casting light and shadows on the walls and floor. Leaves on a tree or bush can be seen just outside the window.

Hopper, often reticent about discussing the meaning of his art, suggested earlier in his career that his artworks simultaneously carry unintended, unconscious ideas, as well as deliberate expressions of his personal vision. Critics believe Sun in an Empty Room to be his most autobiographical work. The painting has been variously associated with regionalism, the American Scene, symbolism, and even abstract art. Nevertheless, Hopper rejected all such labels.

Neuroscientists believe that the painting reveals limitations of the visual processing system that allow artists to effectively ignore details like shadows, while continuing to maintain a convincing illusion of reality in spite of these missing elements. Beyond the visual arts, the painting inspired others to draw upon its imagery in literature, music, and film.

== Background ==
Edward Hopper (1882–1967) was intensely interested in light, and it was a primary theme and subject in his work. Early in his career, after he left art school, he supported himself by working as a commercial artist, at first in an advertising agency. Tired of illustrating figures required for his paid work, he once famously remarked, "What I wanted to do was to paint sunlight on the side of a house." This lifelong interest in sunlight is found not just in his subjects, but also in many of his titles. Morning Sun (1952), City Sunlight (1954), Sunlight on Brownstones (1956), Sunlight in a Cafeteria (1958), People in the Sun (1960), Second-Story Sunlight (1960), and A Woman in the Sun (1961) are just some examples of this shared theme.

== Development ==
By the end of his career, Hopper had produced over 800 works in total, but his output was measured and methodical. He would spend months deliberating about a work before beginning to paint. It once took him several years before he could even paint an image of a cloud in the sky. By the 1960s, Hopper was slowly producing approximately two paintings a year, usually consisting of one finished work in the spring and another in the fall. He began working on what would become two of his last four paintings in 1963. From March to April of that year, Hopper completed one of his largest paintings, Intermission. At the age of 81, Hopper began working on Sun in an Empty Room in October 1963, just four years before his death at age 84. Art critic Brian O'Doherty (1928–2022) and photographer Hans Namuth (1915–1990) documented the initial preparation and creation of the work at Hopper's Cape Cod summer home and studio in South Truro, Massachusetts.

Like his painting Early Sunday Morning (1930), which once had a figure in a window that was later painted out, Hopper had originally planned for a figure in an early sketch for Sun in an Empty Room, but it was also removed, as it was too big. The work shares elements in common with earlier Hopper paintings, such as Summer Interior (1909), Eleven A.M. (1926), and Room in Brooklyn (1932), but is thought to be a continuation of the themes first explored in his previous work, Rooms by the Sea (1951), (Note: American poet John Hollander (1929–2013) also refers to the connection to Rooms by the Sea in his poem "Sun in an Empty Room" (1995): "It may recall / An earlier glimpse of emptiness, a corner / Of a room by the sea, opening seemingly / Onto an uncontainable expanse of ocean") which also shows an empty room with light coming in. While working on the painting, Hopper told O'Doherty that he had been curious about the idea of an empty room for some time, and had previously considered what it would be like to represent a scene with no observer: "When we were at school, [Guy Pène du Bois] and Rockwell Kent and others debated what a room looked like when there was nobody to see it, nobody looking in even."

== Description ==
Sunlight enters an empty room through a window at the right, casting light amidst shadows on two walls and the floor. The light falls from the right to the left, towards a corner which casts a shadow on a back wall to the lower left, with a strip of light on the bottom wall and floor. The light coming from the window takes the form of a yellow trapezoid on both walls where it falls. Outside the room, as seen through the window, green foliage is visible, possibly from a tree.

== Interpretation ==
Throughout his career, Hopper said and wrote almost nothing about the meaning of his work, and from what he did say, there is conflicting information. In one letter, Hopper said he thought that art is an "expression of the subconscious", and he believed that artists were unaware or unconscious of the most important aspects of their work. And yet, six years after this letter, Hopper wrote that his work "has always been the most exact transcription possible of my most intimate impressions of nature." Art historian Katharine Kuh notes that Hopper refused to analyze his late work, believing that meaning was lost by talking about it. Instead, he would say "The whole answer is there on the canvas". In spite of this, critics believe that the painting is the most autobiographical of Hopper's works. In his personal notebook, Hopper wrote, "Sun in an Empty Room. Green bushes outside window. White light + uncompromising shadow. Stark." Art critic Brian O'Doherty once asked Hopper "what he was after" in the painting; Hopper responded, "I'm after me."

== Style ==
Hopper is considered one of the most distinctive American realists of the 20th century. He did not belong to a specific art school or derive his color scheme from other artists. At the same time, Hopper was one of the most modern realist painters, and yet he never embraced modernism. He also had no real devotees to his style during his lifetime. As modern art gained ground, Hopper dismissed non-representational art as an attempt by artists to indulge in purism, a pursuit which he believed neglected the human experience in favor of form, color, and design in itself.

Despite the complexity of categorizing Hopper's art, critics and art historians believe that Hopper's work represents more than just his personal vision, but is part of a larger modern American realist movement rooted in regionalism. Lloyd Goodrich of the Whitney Museum of American Art once classified Hopper's style as that of an "American Scene" painter, a term which was originally coined by Henry James (1843–1916) for his controversial book The American Scene (1907). In spite of these critical assessments, Hopper refused to accept any connection with the American Scene movement during his lifetime.

Art historian Jerrold Lanes also objected to describing Hopper as an American Scene painter, preferring to describe Hopper's subjects as rooted in the American scene, but with French influences on his composition. As such an influence, Lane pointed to Edgar Degas, describing Hopper's style as more of a symbolist, with a composition that is generalized rather than specific. "For although Sun in an Empty Room is a highly symbolic picture," writes Lanes, "it yet contains nothing that can be called a symbol, whether object or person, except the room and the light, and these are the sine qua non of the design. This is basically the process by which any and all art makes its statement as it is the subject of that statement, and I think the painting can be taken as a measure of the ambitiousness, the purity and the success of Hopper's art at its best, and by the same token of the extent by which it transcends the American or any other scene."

The painting is stripped down to its simplest elements of light and shadow. Because of this, critics have often attempted to compare Hopper's late period works to the more modern style of 20th century abstract art, but Hopper adamantly refused to accept or acknowledge this comparison as well.

== Neuroscience ==
Visual neurophysiologist Margaret Livingstone argues that the painting is part of a larger body of art that reveals how we see and think about the world in terms of visual processing. Livingstone notes that artists can disregard the laws of physics because our visual systems are not concerned with details such as shadows. "Because computations about depth from shading and illumination of objects begin with local computations", writes Livingstone, "images do not have to be globally consistent in order to generate a satisfactory sensation of depth and shadow." In this example, Livingstone shows how Hopper fails to paint a shadow on the wall from the sunlight falling through the middle check rail of the window.

== Cultural influence ==
Many writers and artists have referred to the painting in their work. American poet John Hollander (1929–2013) published a poem about the painting, and in other work, defends Hopper from his critics and portrays Hopper as following in the tradition of Ralph Waldo Emerson. Canadian indie rock band The Weakerthans wrote the song "Sun in an Empty Room" about the painting, publishing it on their fourth album, Reunion Tour (2007). The song's lyrics describe what might have happened in the room. Filmmaker Mathieu Amalric created an entire short film based on the painting, titled Next to Last (Autumn 63) (2012), for the European public service channel Arte, part of a larger series called Hopper Stories. Filmmaker Gustav Deutsch brings the painting to life in the context of American history in his film Shirley: Visions of Reality (2013).

== See also ==
- List of works by Edward Hopper

== Notes and references ==
Notes
