= Edward Hopper =

American painter and printmaker (1882–1967)

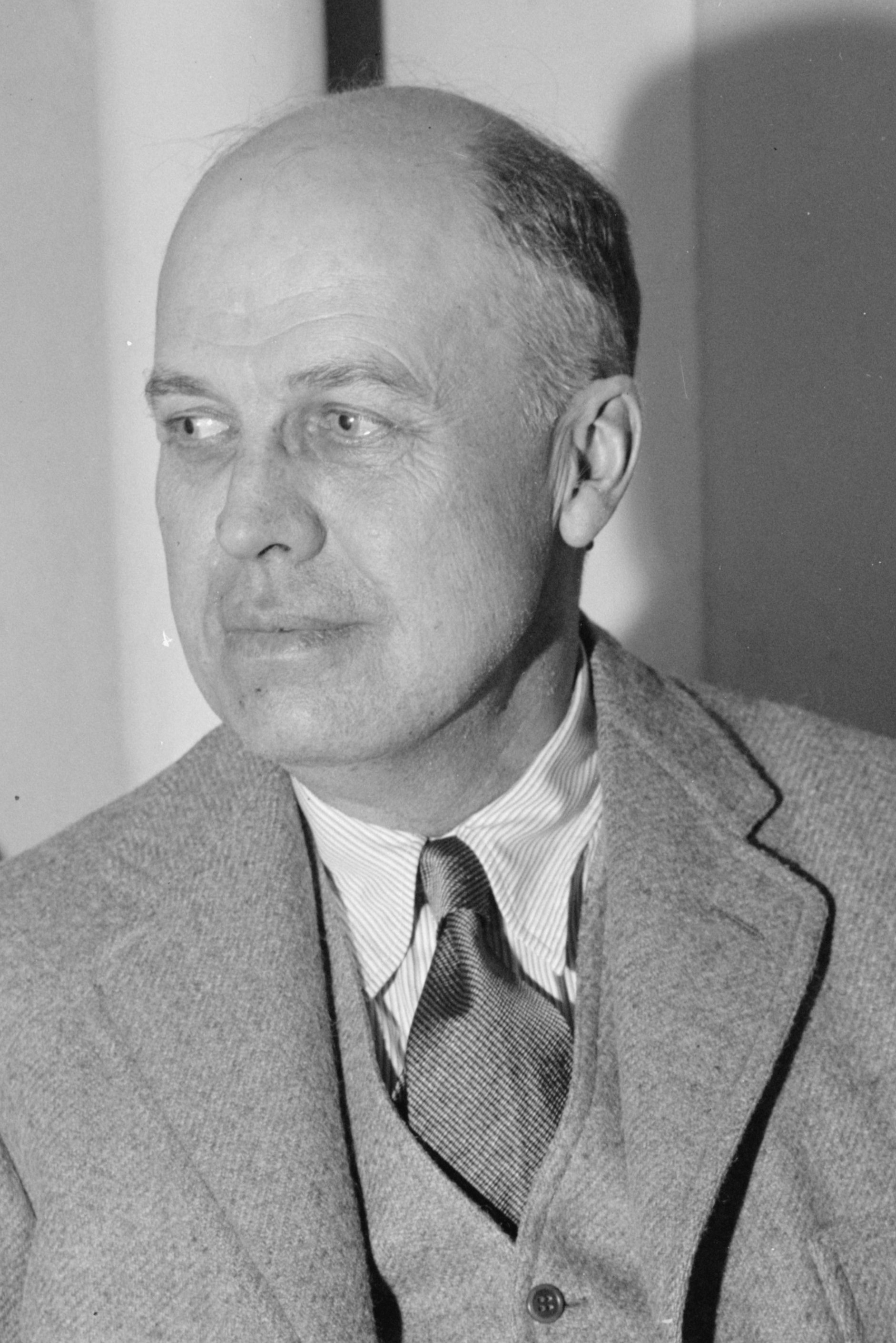
- Hopper in 1937
- Born: Edward Hopper; July 22, 1882; Nyack, New York, U.S.
- Died: May 15, 1967 (aged 84); Manhattan, New York City, U.S.
- Education: Parsons School of Design
- Known for: Painting, printmaking
- Notable work: Automat (1927); Chop Suey (1929); Nighthawks (1942); Office in a Small City (1953)
- Movement: Realism
- Spouse: Josephine Nivison (m. 1924)

Signature
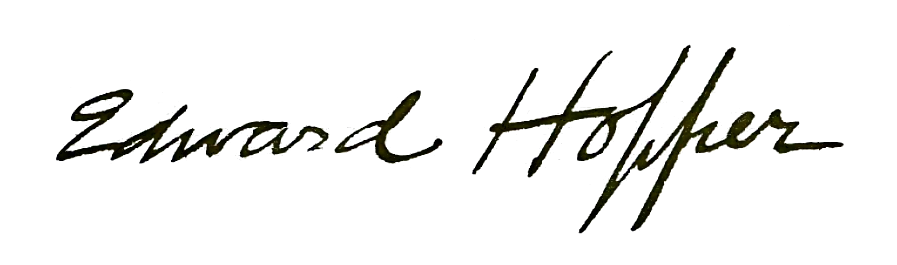

Edward Hopper (July 22, 1882 – May 15, 1967) was an American realist painter and printmaker. He is one of America's most renowned artists, known for his skill in depicting modern American life and landscapes.

Born in Nyack, New York, to a middle-class family, Hopper's early interest in art was supported by his parents. He studied at the New York School of Art under William Merritt Chase and Robert Henri, where he developed a signature style characterized by its emphasis on solitude, light, and shadow.

Hopper's work, including oil paintings, watercolors, and etchings, predominantly explores themes of loneliness and isolation within American urban and rural settings. His most famous painting, Nighthawks (1942), exemplifies his focus on quiet, introspective scenes from everyday life. Though his career advanced slowly, Hopper achieved recognition by the 1920s, with his works featured in major American museums. Hopper's technique, marked by a composition of form and use of light to evoke mood, has been influential in the art world and popular culture. His paintings, often set in the architectural landscapes of New York or the serene environments of New England, convey a sense of narrative depth and emotional resonance, making him a pivotal figure in American Realism. Hopper created subdued drama out of commonplace subjects layered with a poetic meaning, inviting narrative interpretations.

In 1924, Hopper married fellow artist Josephine Nivison, who played a significant role in managing his career and modeling for many of his works. The couple lived modestly in New York City and spent summers on Cape Cod, which influenced much of Hopper's later art. Despite critical acclaim, Hopper remained private and introspective, dedicated to exploring the subtleties of human experience and the American landscape. His depiction of American life, with its emphasis on isolation and contemplation, remains a defining aspect of his appeal and significance in the history of American art.

== Life and career ==
=== Early life ===
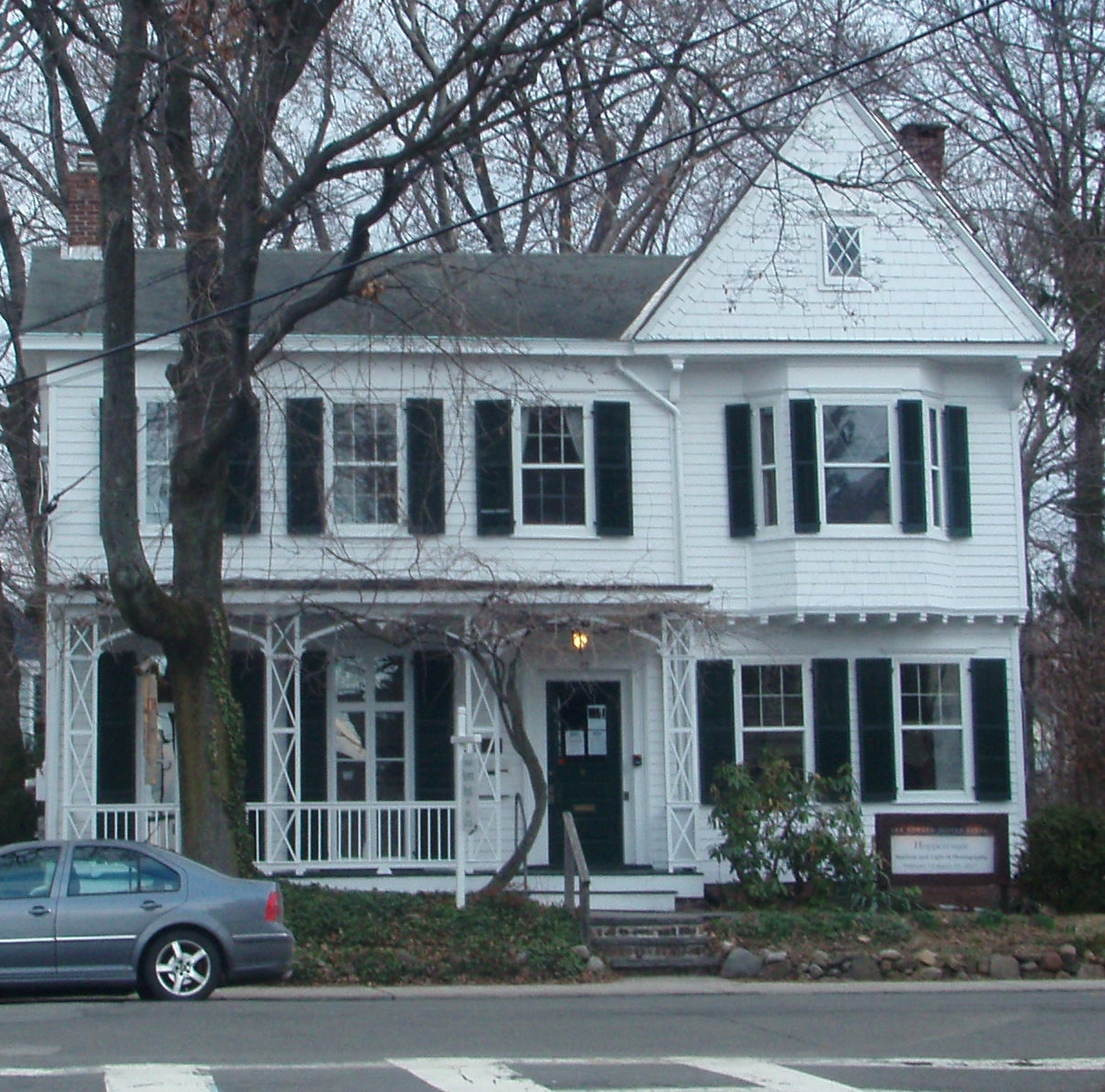
Birthplace and childhood home of Edward Hopper in Nyack, New York

Hopper was born in 1882 in Nyack, New York, a yacht-building center on the Hudson River north of New York City. He was one of two children of a comfortably well-off family. His parents, of mostly Dutch ancestry, were Elizabeth Griffiths Smith and Garret Henry Hopper, a dry-goods merchant. Although not as successful as his forebears, Garret provided well for his two children with considerable help from his wife's inheritance. He retired at age forty-nine. Edward and his sister, Marion, attended both private and public schools. They were raised in a strict Baptist home. His father had a mild nature, and the household was dominated by women: Hopper's mother, grandmother, sister, and maid.

His birthplace and boyhood home was listed on the National Register of Historic Places in 2000. It is now operated as the Edward Hopper House Museum & Study Center, serving as a nonprofit community cultural center featuring exhibitions, workshops, lectures, performances, and special events.

Hopper was a good student in grade school, and by the time he was five, his talent with drawing was already apparent. He readily absorbed his father's intellectual tendencies and love of French and Russian cultures. He also demonstrated his mother's artistic heritage. Hopper's parents encouraged his art and kept him amply supplied with materials, instructional magazines, and illustrated books.

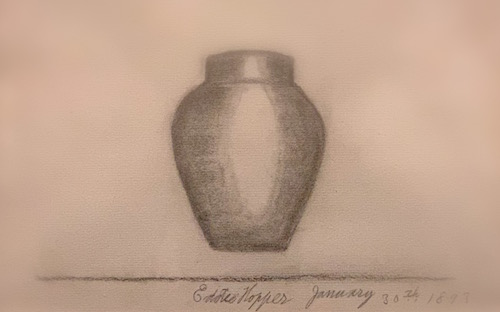
Vase (1893), example of Edward Hopper's earliest signed and dated artwork with attention to light and shadow

Hopper first began signing and dating his drawings at the age of 10. Among the earliest of these drawings are charcoal sketches of geometric shapes, a vase, bowl, cup, and boxes. The detailed examination of light and shadow that continued throughout his career is already visible in these early works. By his teens, he was working in pen-and-ink, charcoal, watercolor, and oil—drawing from nature while also making political cartoons. In 1895, he created his first signed oil painting, Rowboat in Rocky Cove, which he copied from a reproduction in The Art Interchange, a popular journal for amateur artists. Hopper's other earliest oils, such as Old ice pond at Nyack and his c.1898 painting Ships, have been identified as copies of paintings by artists including Bruce Crane and Edward Moran.

In his early self-portraits, Hopper tended to represent himself as skinny, ungraceful, and homely. Though a tall and quiet teenager, his prankish sense of humor found outlet in his art, sometimes in depictions of immigrants or of women dominating men in comical situations. Later in life, he mostly depicted women as the figures in his paintings. While attending Nyack High School, he carved wooden models of sailboats and barges and dreamed of becoming a naval architect, but after graduation in 1899 declared his intention to pursue a career in art. Hopper's parents insisted that he study commercial art to have a reliable means of income. In developing his self-image and individualistic philosophy of life, Hopper was influenced by the writings of Ralph Waldo Emerson. He later said, "I admire him greatly...I read him over and over again."

Hopper began art studies through a correspondence course in 1899. Soon he transferred to the New York School of Art and Design, the forerunner of Parsons School of Design. There, he studied for six years with teachers including William Merritt Chase, who instructed him in oil painting. Early on, Hopper modeled his style after Chase and French Impressionist masters Édouard Manet and Edgar Degas. Sketching from live models, however, proved challenging and somewhat shocking for the conservatively raised Hopper.

Another of his teachers, artist Robert Henri, taught life class. Henri encouraged his students to use their art to "make a stir in the world." He also advised his students, "It isn't the subject that counts but what you feel about it" and "Forget about art and paint pictures of what interests you in life." In this manner, Henri influenced Hopper, as well as future artists George Bellows and Rockwell Kent. He encouraged them to imbue their work with a modern spirit. Some artists in Henri's circle, including John Sloan, became members of "The Eight", also known as the Ashcan School of American Art. Hopper's first surviving oil painting to hint at his use of interiors as a theme was Solitary Figure in a Theater (c.1904). During his student years, he also painted dozens of nudes, still life studies, landscapes, and portraits, including self-portraits.

In 1905, Hopper landed a part-time job with an advertising agency, where he created cover designs for trade magazines. Hopper came to detest illustration. He was bound to it by economic necessity until the mid-1920s. He temporarily escaped by making three trips to Europe, each centered in Paris, ostensibly to study its art scene. In fact, he mostly worked alone and seemed mostly unaffected by the new currents in art. Later, he said he didn't "remember hearing of Picasso at all". He was highly impressed by Rembrandt, particularly his Night Watch, which he said was "the most wonderful thing of his I have seen; it's past belief in its reality."

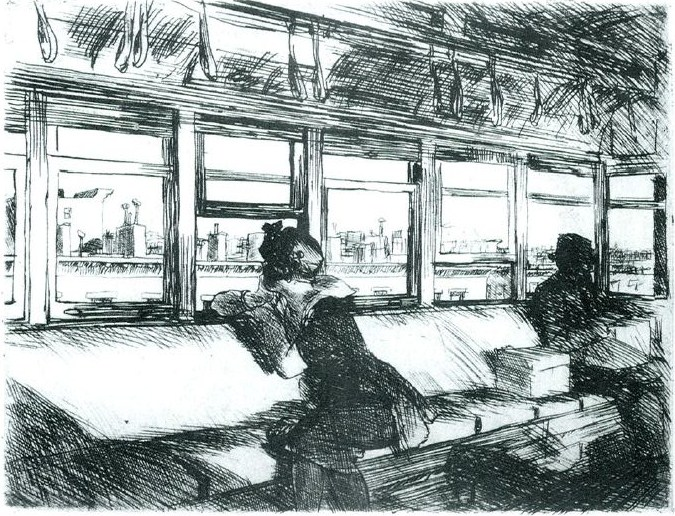
House Tops (1921) by Edward Hopper

Hopper began painting urban and architectural scenes in a dark palette. Then he shifted to the lighter shades of the Impressionists before returning to the darker palette, with which he was most comfortable. He later said, "I got over that and later things done in Paris were more the kind of things I do now." Hopper spent much of his time drawing street and café scenes, and going to the theater and opera. Unlike many of his contemporaries who imitated the abstract cubist experiments, Hopper was attracted to realist art. Later, he claimed few European influences other than Rembrandt, Goya and the French engraver Charles Meryon whose moody Paris scenes Hopper imitated.

=== Years of struggle ===
After returning from his last European trip, Hopper rented a studio in New York City, where he struggled to define his own style. Reluctantly, he returned to illustration to support himself. Being a freelancer, Hopper was forced to solicit for projects, and had to knock on the doors of magazine and agency offices to find business. His painting languished: "it's hard for me to decide what I want to paint. I go for months without finding it sometimes. It comes slowly." His fellow illustrator Walter Tittle described Hopper's depressed emotional state in sharper terms, seeing his friend "suffering...from long periods of unconquerable inertia, sitting for days at a time before his easel in helpless unhappiness, unable to raise a hand to break the spell."

From February 22 to March 5, 1912, he was included in the exhibition of The Independents, a group of artists, at the initiative of Robert Henri, but did not make any sales.

In 1912, Hopper traveled to Gloucester, Massachusetts, to seek some inspiration and made his first outdoor paintings in America. He painted Squam Light, the first of many lighthouse paintings to come.

In 1913, at the Armory Show, Hopper earned $250 when he sold his first painting, Sailing (1911), to an American businessman Thomas F. Vietor, which he had painted over an earlier self-portrait. Hopper was thirty-one, and although he hoped his first sale would lead to others in short order, his career would not catch on for many more years. He continued to participate in group exhibitions at smaller venues, such as the MacDowell Club of New York. Shortly after his father's death that same year, Hopper moved to the 3 Washington Square North apartment in the Greenwich Village section of Manhattan, where he would live for the rest of his life.

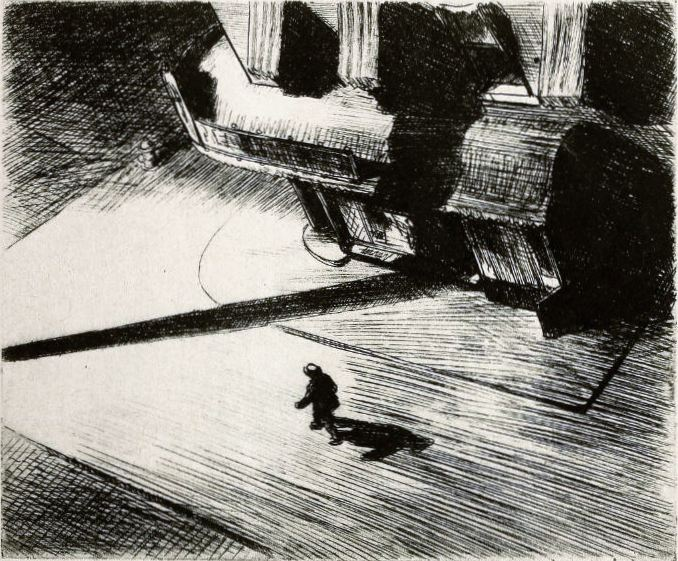
Night Shadows etching from Shadowland, 1922

The following year, he received a commission to create some movie posters and handle publicity for a movie company. Although he did not like the illustration work, Hopper was a lifelong devotee of the cinema and the theatre, both of which he treated as subjects for his paintings. Each form influenced his compositional methods.

At an impasse over his oil paintings, in 1915 Hopper turned to etching. By 1923 he had produced most of his approximately 70 works in this medium, many of urban scenes of both Paris and New York. He also produced some posters for the war effort, as well as continuing with occasional commercial projects. When he could, Hopper did some outdoor oil paintings on visits to New England, especially at the art colonies at Ogunquit, and Monhegan Island.

During the early 1920s his etchings began to receive public recognition. They expressed some of his later themes, as in Night on the El Train (couples in silence), Evening Wind (solitary female), and The Catboat (simple nautical scene). Two notable oil paintings of this time were New York Interior (1921) and New York Restaurant (1922). He also painted two of his many "window" paintings to come: Girl at Sewing Machine and Moonlight Interior, both of which show a figure (clothed or nude) near a window of an apartment viewed as gazing out or from the point of view from the outside looking in.

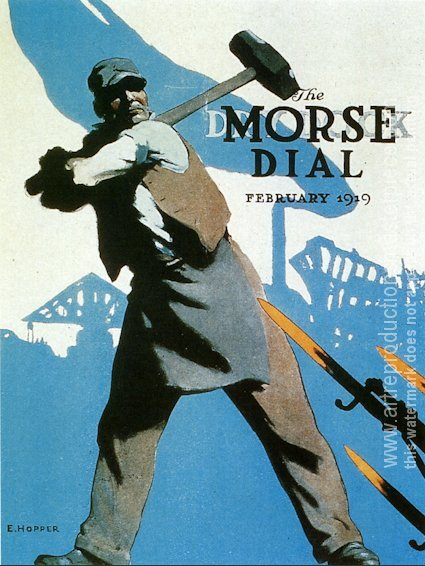
Hopper's prizewinning poster, Smash the Hun (1919), reproduced on the front cover of the Morse Dry Dock Dial

Although these were frustrating years, Hopper gained some recognition. In 1918, Hopper was awarded the U.S. Shipping Board Prize for his war poster, Smash the Hun. He participated in three exhibitions: in 1917 with the Society of Independent Artists, in January 1920 (a one-man exhibition at the Whitney Studio Club, which was the precursor to the Whitney Museum), and in 1922 (again with the Whitney Studio Club). In 1923, Hopper received two awards for his etchings: the Logan Prize from the Chicago Society of Etchers, and the W. A. Bryan Prize.

=== Marriage and breakthrough ===
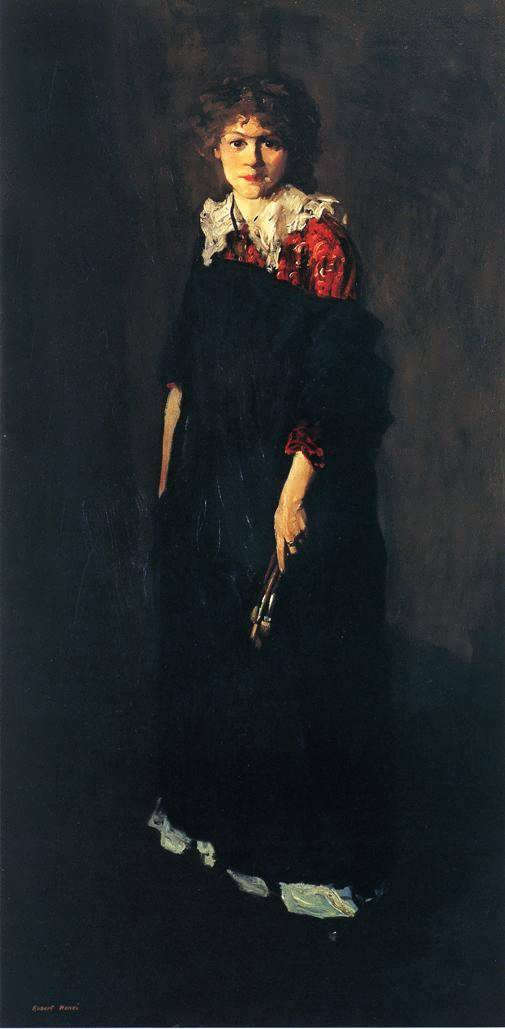
Miss Josephine Nivison, by Robert Henri, 1906

By 1923, Hopper's slow climb finally produced a breakthrough. He re-encountered Josephine Nivison, an artist and former student of Robert Henri, during a summer painting trip in Gloucester, Massachusetts. They were opposites: she was short, open, gregarious, sociable, and liberal, while he was tall, secretive, shy, quiet, introspective, and conservative. With Jo's encouragement, Hopper turned to the medium of watercolor, producing numerous scenes of Gloucester. They married a year later with artist Guy Pène du Bois as their best man. Nivison once remarked: "Sometimes talking to Eddie is just like dropping a stone in a well, except that it doesn't thump when it hits bottom." She subordinated her career to his and shared his reclusive lifestyle. The rest of their lives revolved around their spare walk-up apartment in the city and their summers in South Truro on Cape Cod. She managed his career and his interviews, was his primary model, and was his life companion.

With Nivison's help, six of Hopper's Gloucester watercolors were admitted to an exhibit at the Brooklyn Museum in 1923. One of them, The Mansard Roof, was purchased by the museum for its permanent collection for the sum of $100. The critics generally raved about his work; one stated, "What vitality, force and directness! Observe what can be done with the homeliest subject." Hopper sold all his watercolors at a one-man show the following year and finally decided to put illustration behind him.

The artist had demonstrated his ability to transfer his attraction to Parisian architecture to American urban and rural architecture. According to Boston Museum of Fine Arts curator Carol Troyen, "Hopper really liked the way these houses, with their turrets and towers and porches and mansard roofs and ornament cast wonderful shadows. Hopper always said that his favorite thing was painting sunlight on the side of a house."

At forty-one, Hopper received further recognition for his work. He continued to harbor bitterness about his career, later turning down appearances and awards. With his financial stability secured by steady sales, Hopper would live a simple, stable life and continue creating art in his personal style for four more decades.

His Two on the Aisle (1927) sold for a personal record $1,500, enabling Hopper to purchase an automobile, which he used to make field trips to remote areas of New England. In 1929, he produced Chop Suey and Railroad Sunset. The following year, art patron Stephen Clark donated House by the Railroad (1925) to the Museum of Modern Art, the first oil painting that it acquired for its collection. Hopper painted his last self-portrait in oil around 1930. Although Josephine posed for many of his paintings, she sat for only one formal oil portrait by her husband, Jo Painting (1936).

Hopper fared better than many other artists during the Great Depression. His stature took a sharp rise in 1931 when major museums, including the Whitney Museum of American Art and the Metropolitan Museum of Art, paid thousands of dollars for his works. He sold 30 paintings that year, including 13 watercolors. The following year he participated in the first Whitney Annual, and he continued to exhibit in every annual at the museum for the rest of his life. In 1933, the Museum of Modern Art gave Hopper his first large-scale retrospective.

In 1930, the Hoppers rented a cottage in South Truro, on Cape Cod. They returned every summer for the rest of their lives, building a summer house there in 1934. From there, they would take driving trips into other areas when Hopper needed to search for fresh material to paint. In the summers of 1937 and 1938, the couple spent extended sojourns on Wagon Wheels Farm in South Royalton, Vermont, where Hopper painted a series of watercolors along the White River. These scenes are atypical among Hopper's mature works, as most are "pure" landscapes, devoid of architecture or human figures. First Branch of the White River (1938), now in the Museum of Fine Arts, Boston, is the best-known of Hopper's Vermont landscapes.

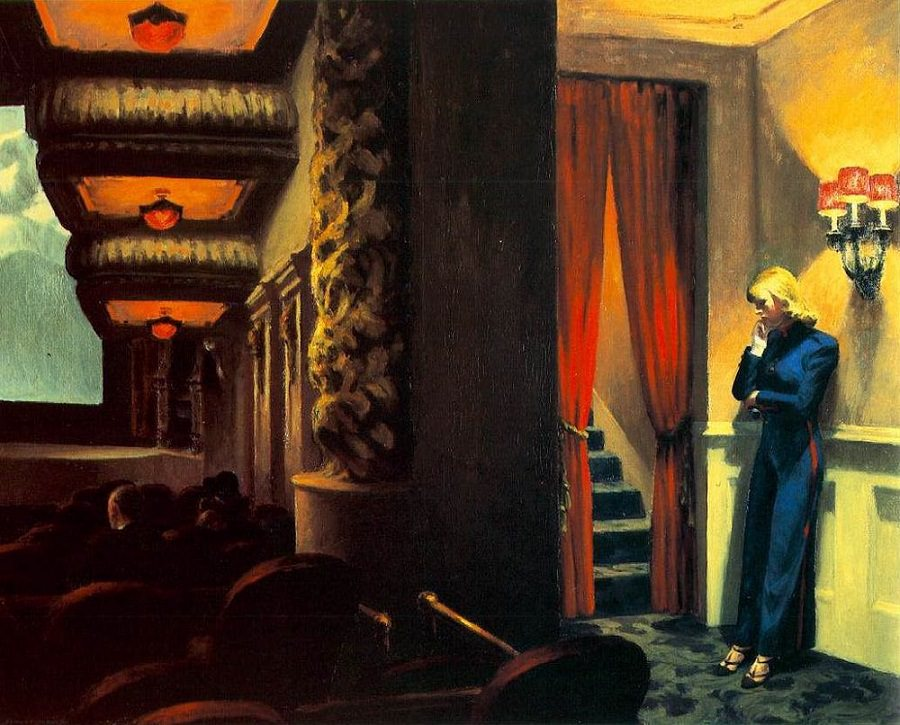
New York Movie, 1939

Hopper was very productive through the 1930s and early 1940s, producing among many important works New York Movie (1939), Girlie Show (1941), Nighthawks (1942), Hotel Lobby (1943), and Morning in a City (1944). During the late 1940s, however, he suffered a period of relative inactivity. He admitted: "I wish I could paint more. I get sick of reading and going to the movies." During the next two decades, his health faltered, and he had several prostate surgeries and other medical problems. But, in the 1950s and early 1960s, he created several more major works, including First Row Orchestra (1951); as well as Morning Sun and Hotel by a Railroad, both in 1952; and Intermission in 1963.

In 1966, Hopper was awarded The Edward MacDowell Medal by The MacDowell Colony for outstanding contributions to American culture.

=== Death ===
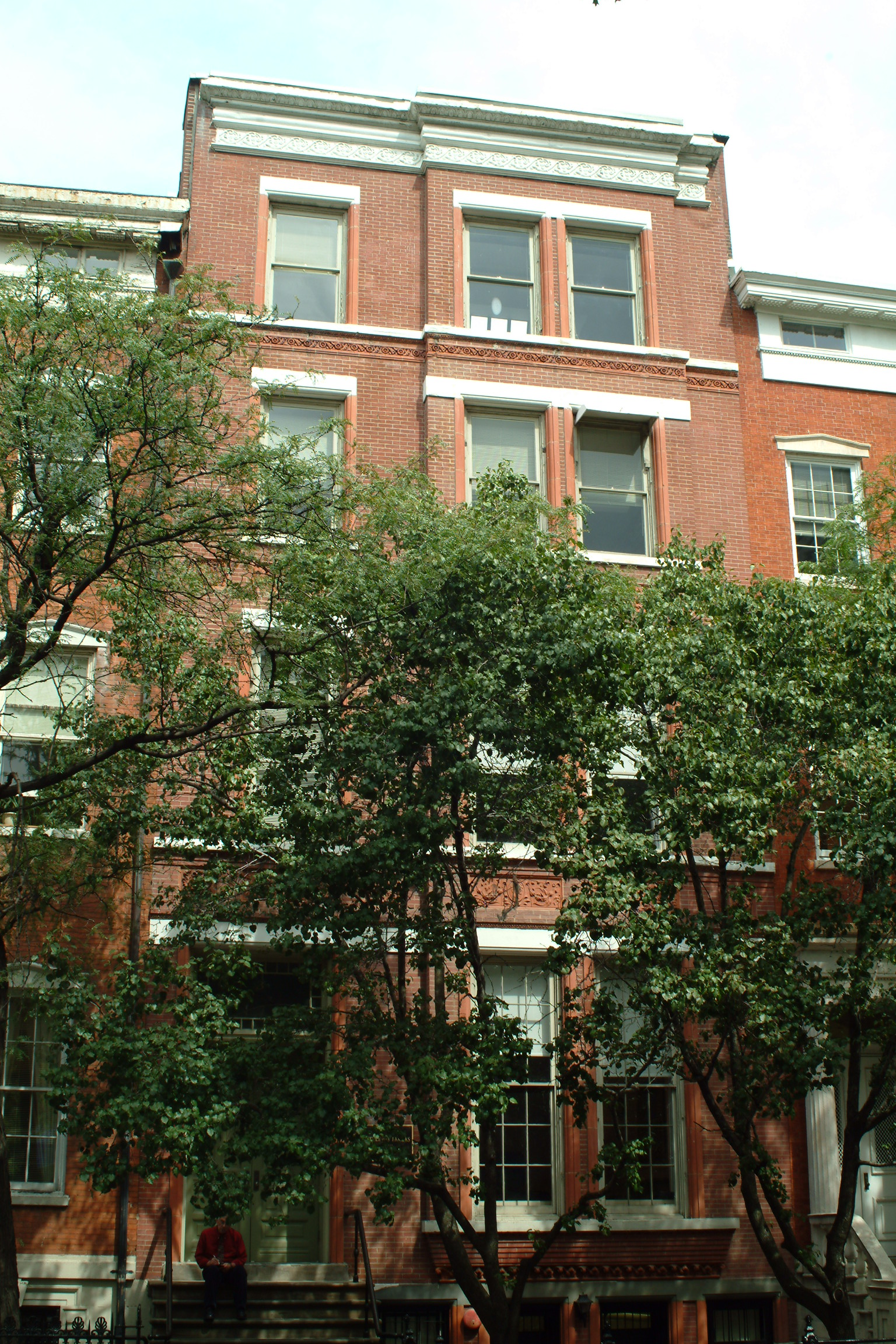
Where Hopper lived in New York City, at 3 Washington Square North

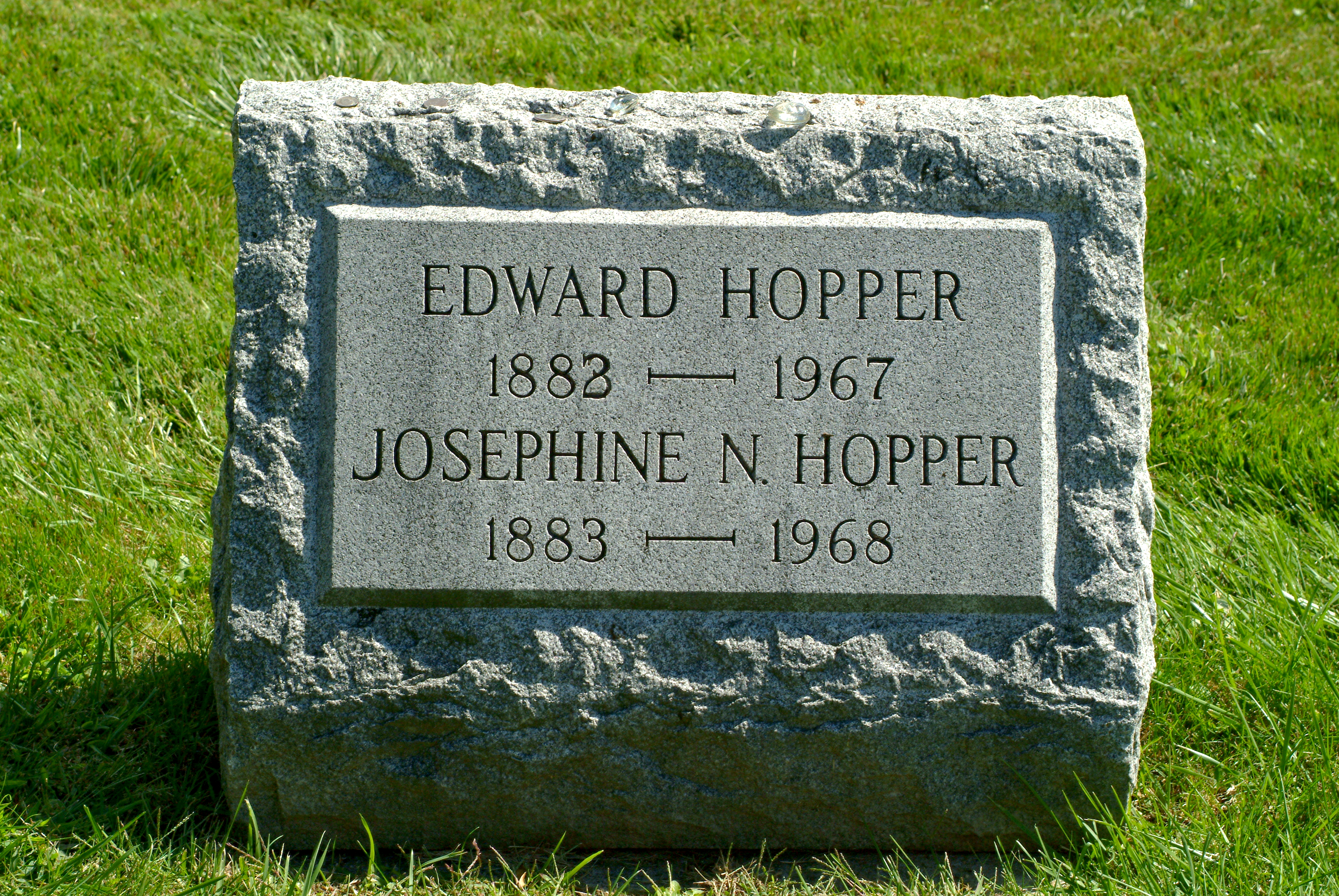
Gravestone of Edward and Josephine Hopper, Oak Hill Cemetery, Nyack, N.Y.

Hopper died of natural causes at the age of 84 in his studio near Washington Square in New York City on May 15, 1967. He was buried two days later in the family plot at Oak Hill Cemetery in Nyack, New York, his place of birth. His wife Josephine died ten months later and is buried with him.

Josephine bequeathed their joint collection of over three thousand pieces to the Whitney Museum. Arthayer Sanborn, a Baptist minister who frequently visited their home to care for Edward's sister, Marion, came into possession of three hundred Hopper drawings and paintings. Art historian Gail Levin has highlighted that whereas the Whitney Museum has extensive documentation of how Josephine distributed their couple's pieces, paintings acquired from Sanborn lack provenance proving the family willingly gifted the trove of pieces Sanborn reported finding in their attic. The Museum of Modern Art in New York, Des Moines Art Center, and Art Institute of Chicago all have significant collections of Hopper paintings.

== Art ==
=== Personality and vision ===
Always reluctant to discuss himself and his art, Hopper simply said, "The whole answer is there on the canvas." Hopper was stoic and fatalistic—a quiet introverted man with a gentle sense of humor and a frank manner. Hopper was someone drawn to an emblematic, anti-narrative symbolism, who "painted short isolated moments of configuration, saturated with suggestion". His silent spaces and uneasy encounters "touch us where we are most vulnerable", and have "a suggestion of melancholy, that melancholy being enacted". His sense of color revealed him as a pure painter, as he "turned the Puritan into the purist, in his quiet canvasses where blemishes and blessings balance". According to critic Lloyd Goodrich, he was "an eminently native painter, who more than any other was getting more of the quality of America into his canvases".

Conservative in politics and social matters (Hopper asserted for example that "artists' lives should be written by people very close to them"), he accepted things as they were and displayed a lack of idealism. Cultured and sophisticated, he was well-read, and many of his paintings show figures reading. He was generally good company and unperturbed by silences, though sometimes taciturn, grumpy, or detached. He was always serious about his art and the art of others, and when asked would return frank opinions.

Hopper's most systematic declaration of his philosophy as an artist was given in a handwritten note, titled "Statement", submitted in 1953 to the journal Reality:

Great art is the outward expression of an inner life in the artist, and this inner life will result in his personal vision of the world. No amount of skillful invention can replace the essential element of imagination. One of the weaknesses of much abstract painting is the attempt to substitute the inventions of the human intellect for a private imaginative conception.

The inner life of a human being is a vast and varied realm and does not concern itself alone with stimulating arrangements of color, form and design.

The term life used in art is something not to be held in contempt, for it implies all of existence and the province of art is to react to it and not to shun it.

Painting will have to deal more fully and less obliquely with life and nature's phenomena before it can again become great.

— Edward Hopper, Published as part of "Statements by Four Artists" in Reality, vol. 1, no. 1 (Spring 1953). Hopper's handwritten draft is reproduced in Levin, Edward Hopper: An Intimate Biography, p. 461.

Though Hopper claimed that he didn't consciously embed psychological meaning in his paintings, he was deeply interested in Freud and the power of the subconscious mind. He wrote in 1939: "So much of every art is an expression of the subconscious that it seems to me most of all the important qualities are put there unconsciously, and little of importance by the conscious intellect."

=== Methods ===
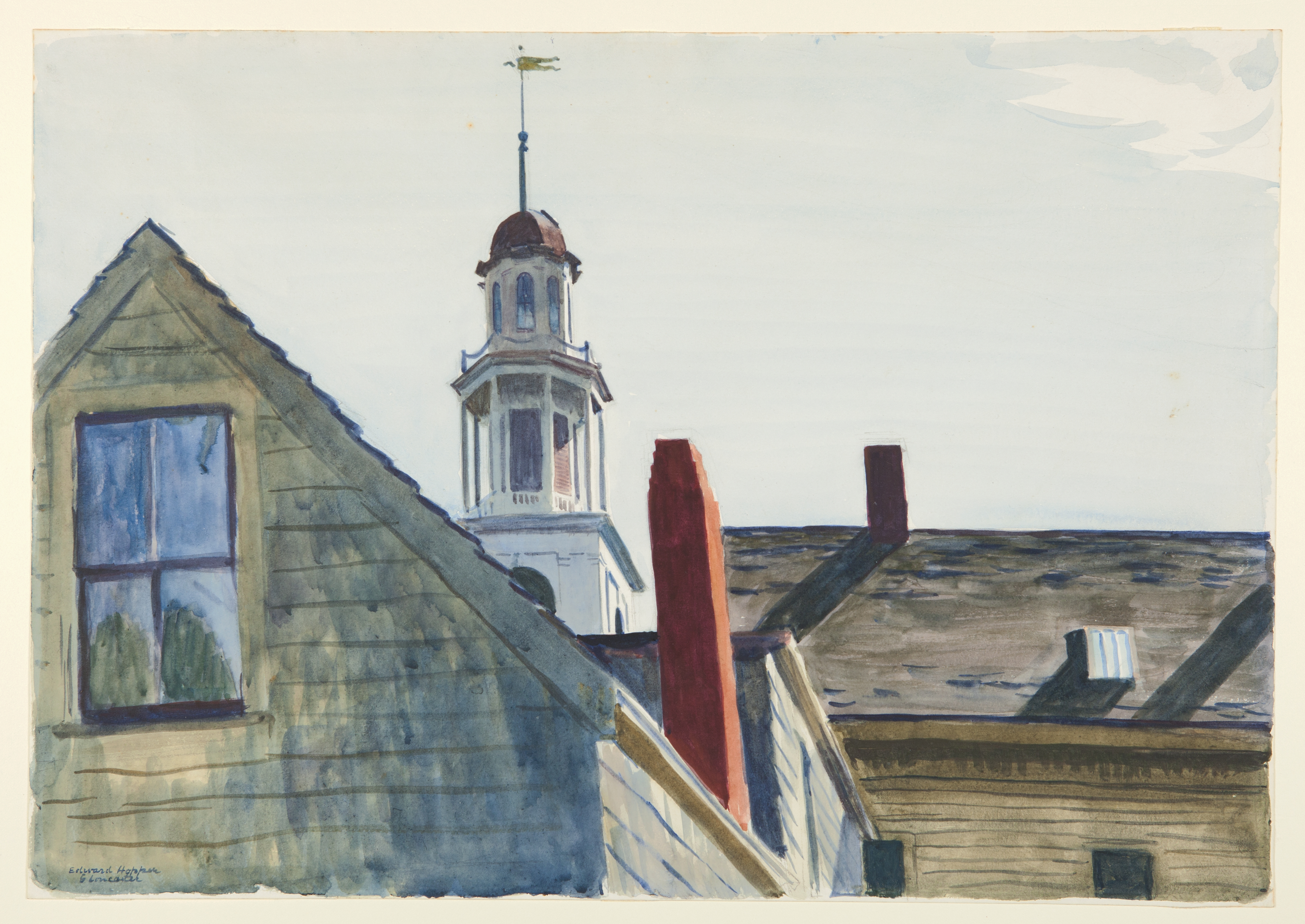
Universalist Church, 1926, watercolor over graphite on cream wove paper, Princeton University Art Museum

Although he is best known for his oil paintings, Hopper initially achieved recognition for his watercolors, and he also produced some commercially successful etchings. Additionally, his notebooks contain high-quality pen and pencil sketches, which were never meant for public viewing.

Hopper paid particular attention to geometrical design and the careful placement of human figures in proper balance with their environment. He was a slow and methodical artist; as he wrote, "It takes a long time for an idea to strike. Then I have to think about it for a long time. I don't start painting until I have it all worked out in my mind. I'm all right when I get to the easel". He often made preparatory sketches to work out his carefully calculated compositions. He and his wife kept a detailed ledger of their works noting such items as "sad face of woman unlit", "electric light from ceiling", and "thighs cooler".

For New York Movie (1939), Hopper demonstrated his thorough preparation with more than 53 sketches of the theater interior and the figure of the pensive usherette.

The effective use of light and shadow to create mood is also central to Hopper's methods. Bright sunlight (as an emblem of insight or revelation), and the shadows it casts, play symbolically powerful roles in Hopper paintings such as Early Sunday Morning (1930), Summertime (1943), Seven A.M. (1948), and Sun in an Empty Room (1963). His use of light and shadow effects has been compared to the cinematography of film noir.

Although a realist painter, Hopper's "soft" realism simplified shapes and details. He used saturated color to heighten contrast and create mood.

=== Subjects and themes ===
Hopper derived his subject matter from two primary sources: the common features of American life (such as gas stations, motels, restaurants, theaters, railroads, and street scenes) and their inhabitants; and seascapes and rural landscapes. Regarding his style, Hopper defined himself as "an amalgam of many races" and not a member of any school, particularly the "Ashcan School". Once Hopper achieved his mature style, his art remained consistent and self-contained, despite the numerous art trends that came and went during his long career.

Hopper's seascapes fall into three main groups: pure landscapes of rocks, sea, and beach grass; lighthouses and farmhouses; and sailboats. Sometimes he combined these elements. Most of these paintings depict strong light and fair weather; he showed little interest in snow or rain scenes, or in seasonal color changes. He painted the majority of the pure seascapes between 1916 and 1919 on Monhegan Island. Hopper's The Long Leg (1935) is a nearly all-blue sailing picture with the simplest of elements, while his Ground Swell (1939) is more complex and depicts a group of youngsters out for a sail, a theme reminiscent of Winslow Homer's iconic Breezing Up (A Fair Wind) (1876).

Urban architecture and cityscapes were also major subjects for Hopper. He was fascinated with the American urban scene, "our native architecture with its hideous beauty, its fantastic roofs, pseudo-gothic, French Mansard, Colonial, mongrel or what not, with eye-searing color or delicate harmonies of faded paint, shouldering one another along interminable streets that taper off into swamps or dump heaps."

In 1925, he produced House by the Railroad. This classic work depicts an isolated Victorian wood mansion, partly obscured by the raised embankment of a railroad. It marked Hopper's artistic maturity. Lloyd Goodrich praised the work as "one of the most poignant and desolating pieces of realism". The work is the first of a series of stark rural and urban scenes that use sharp lines and large shapes, played upon by unusual lighting to capture the lonely mood of his subjects. Although critics and viewers interpret meaning and mood in these cityscapes, Hopper insisted, "I was more interested in the sunlight on the buildings and on the figures than any symbolism." As if to prove the point, his late painting Sun in an Empty Room (1963) is a pure study of sunlight.

Most of Hopper's figure paintings focus on the subtle interaction of human beings with their environment—carried out with solo figures, couples, or groups. His primary emotional themes are solitude, loneliness, regret, boredom, and resignation. He expresses these emotions in various environments, including the office, in public places, in apartments, on the road, or on vacation. As if he were creating stills for a movie or tableaux in a play, Hopper positioned his characters as if they were captured just before or just after the climax of a scene.

Hopper's solitary figures are mostly women—dressed, semi-clad, and nude—often reading or looking out a window, or in the workplace. In the early 1920s, Hopper painted his first such images: Girl at Sewing Machine (1921), New York Interior (another woman sewing) (1921), and Moonlight Interior (a nude getting into bed) (1923). Automat (1927) and Hotel Room (1931), however, are more representative of his mature style, emphasizing solitude more overtly.

As Hopper scholar Gail Levin wrote of Hotel Room:

The spare vertical and diagonal bands of color and sharp electric shadows create a concise and intense drama in the night... Combining poignant subject matter with such a powerful formal arrangement, Hopper's composition is pure enough to approach an almost abstract sensibility, yet layered with a poetic meaning for the observer.

Hopper's Room in New York (1932) and Cape Cod Evening (1939) are prime examples of his "couple" paintings. In the first, a young couple appear alienated and uncommunicative—he reading the newspaper while she idles by the piano. The viewer takes on the role of a voyeur, as if looking with a telescope through the window of the apartment to spy on the couple's lack of intimacy. In the latter painting, an older couple with little to say to each other are playing with their dog, whose own attention is drawn away from his masters. Hopper takes the couple theme to a more ambitious level with Excursion into Philosophy (1959). A middle-aged man sits dejectedly on the edge of a bed. Beside him lies an open book and a partially clad woman. A shaft of light illuminates the floor in front of him. Jo Hopper noted in their log book, "[T]he open book is Plato, reread too late".

Levin interprets the painting:

Plato's philosopher, in search of the real and the true, must turn away from this transitory realm and contemplate the eternal Forms and Ideas. The pensive man in Hopper's painting is positioned between the lure of the earthly domain, figured by the woman, and the call of the higher spiritual domain, represented by the ethereal lightfall. The pain of thinking about this choice and its consequences, after reading Plato all night, is evident. He is paralysed by the fervent inner labour of the melancholic.

In Office at Night (1940), another "couple" painting, Hopper creates a psychological puzzle. The painting shows a man focusing on his work papers, while nearby his attractive female secretary pulls a file. Several studies for the painting show how Hopper experimented with the positioning of the two figures, perhaps to heighten the eroticism and the tension. Hopper presents the viewer with the possibilities that the man is either truly uninterested in the woman's appeal or that he is working hard to ignore her. Another interesting aspect of the painting is how Hopper employs three light sources, from a desk lamp, through a window and indirect light from above. Hopper went on to make several "office" pictures, but no others with a sensual undercurrent.

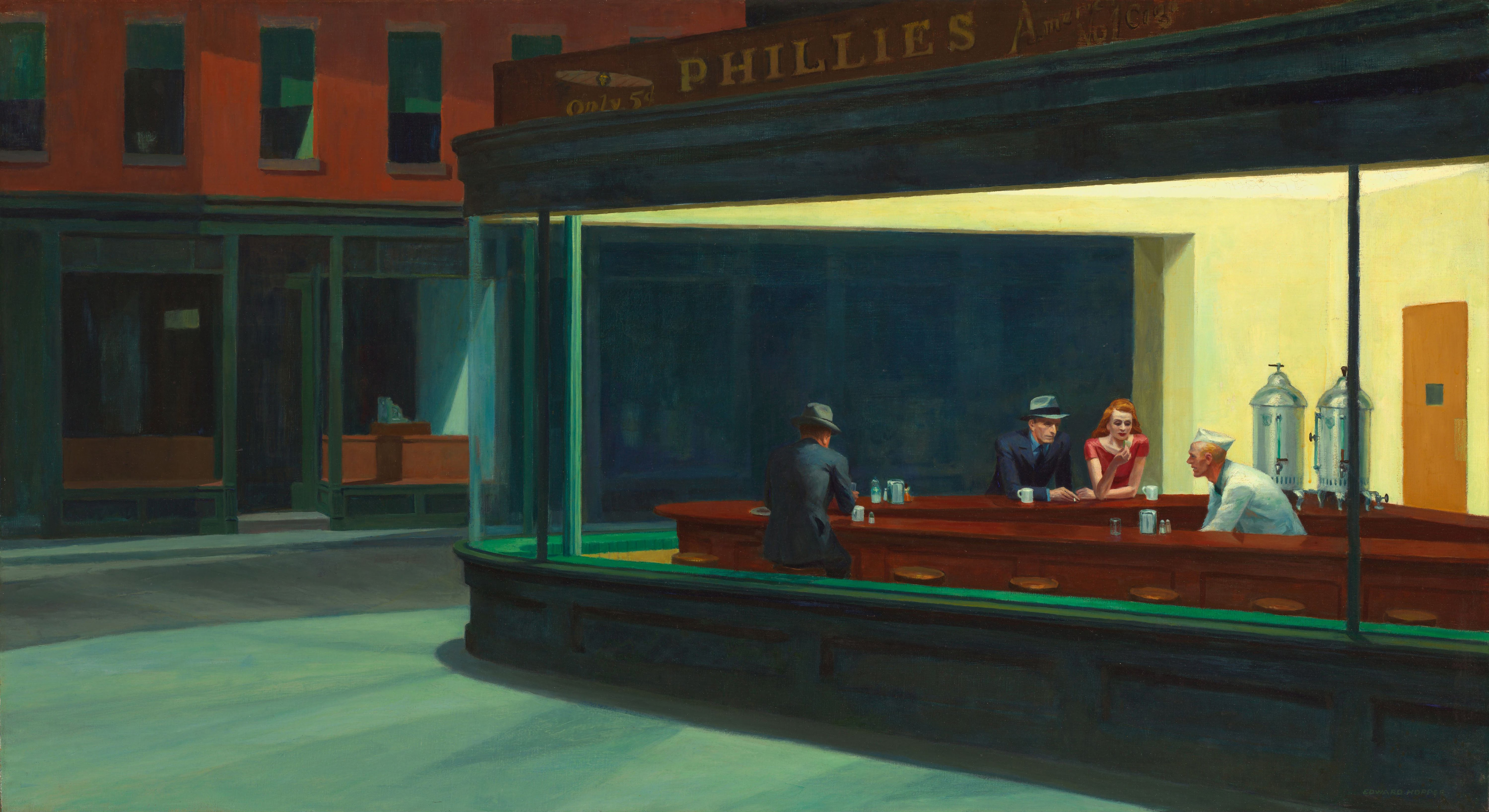
Nighthawks (1942)

The best-known of Hopper's paintings, Nighthawks (1942), is one of his paintings of groups. It shows customers sitting at the counter of an all-night diner. The shapes and diagonals are carefully constructed. The viewpoint is cinematic—from the sidewalk, as if the viewer were approaching the restaurant. The diner's harsh electric light sets it apart from the dark night outside, enhancing the mood and subtle emotion. As in many Hopper paintings, the interaction is minimal. The restaurant depicted was inspired by one in Greenwich Village. Both Hopper and his wife posed for the figures, and Jo Hopper gave the painting its title. The inspiration for the picture may have come from Ernest Hemingway's short story "The Killers", which Hopper greatly admired, (Note: Hopper wrote: "I want to compliment you for printing Ernest Hemingway's "The Killers" in the March Scribner's. It is refreshing to come upon such a honest piece of work in an American magazine, after wading through the vast sea of sugar coated mush that makes up the most of our fiction. Of the concessions to popular prejudices, the side stepping of truth, and the ingenious mechanism of the trick ending there is no taint in this story.") or from the more philosophical "A Clean, Well-Lighted Place". The mood of the painting has sometimes been interpreted as an expression of wartime anxiety. In keeping with the title of his painting, Hopper later said, Nighthawks has more to do with the possibility of predators in the night than with loneliness.

His second most recognizable painting after Nighthawks is another urban painting, Early Sunday Morning (originally called Seventh Avenue Shops), which shows an empty street scene in sharp side light, with a fire hydrant and a barber pole as stand-ins for human figures. Originally Hopper intended to put figures in the upstairs windows but left them empty to heighten the feeling of desolation.

Hopper's rural New England scenes, such as Gas (1940), are no less meaningful. Gas represents "a different, equally clean, well-lighted refuge ... ke[pt] open for those in need as they navigate the night, traveling their own miles to go before they sleep." The work presents a fusion of several Hopper themes: the solitary figure, the melancholy of dusk, and the lonely road.

Hopper's Rooms by the Sea (1951), shows an open door with a view of the ocean, without an apparent ladder or steps and no indication of a beach.

After his student years, Hopper's nudes were all women. Unlike past artists who painted the female nude to glorify the female form and to highlight female eroticism, Hopper's nudes are solitary women who are psychologically exposed. One audacious exception is Girlie Show (1941), where a red-headed strip-tease queen strides confidently across a stage to the accompaniment of the musicians in the pit. Girlie Show was inspired by Hopper's visit to a burlesque show a few days earlier. Hopper's wife, as usual, posed for him for the painting, and noted in her diary, "Ed beginning a new canvas—a burlesque queen doing a strip tease—and I posing without a stitch on in front of the stove—nothing but high heels in a lottery dance pose."

Hopper's portraits and self-portraits were relatively few after his student years. Hopper did produce a commissioned "portrait" of a house, The MacArthurs' Home (1939), where he faithfully details the Victorian architecture of the home of actress Helen Hayes. She reported later, "I guess I never met a more misanthropic, grumpy individual in my life." Hopper grumbled throughout the project and never again accepted a commission. Hopper also painted Portrait of Orleans (1950), a "portrait" of the Cape Cod town from its main street.

Though very interested in the American Civil War and Mathew Brady's battlefield photographs, Hopper made only two historical paintings. Both depicted soldiers on their way to Gettysburg. Also rare among his themes are paintings showing action. The best example of an action painting is Bridle Path (1939), but Hopper's struggle with the proper anatomy of the horses may have discouraged him from similar attempts.

Hopper's final oil painting, Two Comedians (1966), painted one year before his death, focuses on his love of the theater. Two French pantomime actors, one male and one female, both dressed in bright white costumes, take their bow in front of a darkened stage. Jo Hopper confirmed that her husband intended the figures to suggest they are taking their life's last bows together as husband and wife.

Hopper's paintings have often been seen by others as having a narrative or thematic content that the artist may not have intended. Much meaning can be added to a painting by its title, but the titles of Hopper's paintings were sometimes chosen by others, or were selected by Hopper and his wife in a way that makes it unclear whether they have any real connection with the artist's meaning. For example, Hopper once told an interviewer that he was "fond of Early Sunday Morning... but it wasn't necessarily Sunday. That word was tacked on later by someone else."

The tendency to read thematic or narrative content into Hopper's paintings, that Hopper had not intended, extended even to his wife. When Jo Hopper commented on the figure in Cape Cod Morning "It's a woman looking out to see if the weather's good enough to hang out her wash," Hopper retorted, "Did I say that? You're making it Norman Rockwell. From my point of view she's just looking out the window."

Hopper's Summer Evening, a young couple talking in the harsh light of a cottage porch, is inescapably romantic, but Hopper was hurt by one critic's suggestion that it would do for an illustration in "any woman's magazine." Hopper had the painting in the back of his head "for 20 years and I never thought of putting the figures in until I actually started last summer. Why any art director would tear the picture apart. The figures were not what interested me; it was the light streaming down, and the night all around."

— Time, January 19, 1948, pp. 59–60.

=== Place in American art ===
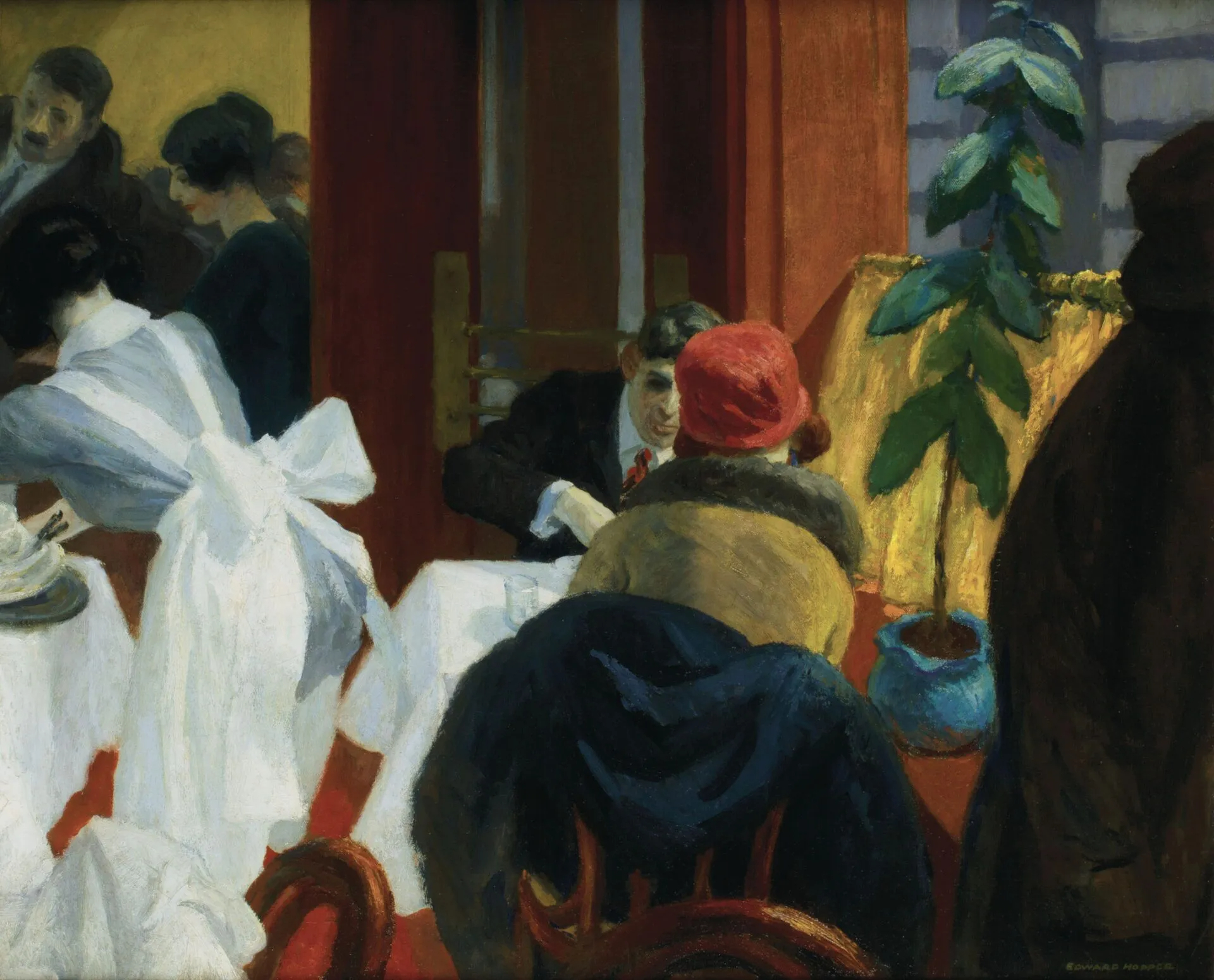
New York Restaurant (1922)

In focusing primarily on quiet moments, very rarely showing action, Hopper employed a form of realism adopted by another leading American realist, Andrew Wyeth, but Hopper's technique was completely different from Wyeth's hyper-detailed style. In league with some of his contemporaries, Hopper shared his urban sensibility with John Sloan and George Bellows but avoided their overt action and violence. Where Joseph Stella and Georgia O'Keeffe glamorized the monumental structures of the city, Hopper reduced them to everyday geometrics and he depicted the pulse of the city as desolate and dangerous rather than "elegant or seductive".

Charles Burchfield, whom Hopper admired and to whom he was compared, said of Hopper, "he achieves such a complete verity that you can read into his interpretations of houses and conceptions of New York life any human implications you wish." He also attributed Hopper's success to his "bold individualism. ... In him we have regained that sturdy American independence which Thomas Eakins gave us, but which for a time was lost." Hopper considered this a high compliment since he considered Eakins the greatest American painter.

Hopper scholar Deborah Lyons writes, "Our own moments of revelation are often mirrored, transcendent, in his work. Once seen, Hopper's interpretations exist in our consciousness in tandem with our own experience. We forever see a certain type of house as a Hopper house, invested perhaps with a mystery that Hopper implanted in our own vision." Hopper's paintings highlight the seemingly mundane and typical scenes in our everyday life and give them cause for epiphany. In this way Hopper's art takes the gritty American landscape and lonely gas stations and creates within them a sense of beautiful anticipation.

Although compared to his contemporary Norman Rockwell in terms of subject matter, Hopper did not like the comparison. Hopper considered himself more subtle, less illustrative, and certainly not sentimental. Hopper also rejected comparisons with Grant Wood and Thomas Hart Benton stating "I think the American Scene painters caricatured America. I always wanted to do myself."

=== Influence ===
Hopper's influence on the art world and pop culture is undeniable; see § In popular culture for numerous examples. Though he had no formal students, many artists have cited him as an influence, including Willem de Kooning, Jim Dine, and Mark Rothko. An illustration of Hopper's influence is Rothko's early work Composition I (c. 1931), which is a direct paraphrase of Hopper's Chop Suey.

Hopper's cinematic compositions and dramatic use of light and dark have made him a favorite among filmmakers. For example, House by the Railroad is reported to have heavily influenced the iconic house in the Alfred Hitchcock film Psycho. The same painting has also been cited as being an influence on the home in the Terrence Malick film Days of Heaven. The 1981 film Pennies from Heaven includes a tableau vivant of Nighthawks, with the lead actors in the places of the diners. German director Wim Wenders also cites Hopper influence. His 1997 film The End of Violence also incorporates a tableau vivant of Nighthawks, recreated by actors. Noted surrealist horror film director Dario Argento went so far as to recreate the diner and the patrons in Nighthawks as part of a set for his 1976 film Deep Red (aka Profondo Rosso). Ridley Scott has cited the same painting as a visual inspiration for Blade Runner. To establish the lighting of scenes in the 2002 film Road to Perdition, director Sam Mendes drew from the paintings of Hopper as a source of inspiration, particularly New York Movie. The Austrian filmmaker Gustav Deutsch based a movie on 13 of Hopper's paintings.

Homages to Nighthawks featuring cartoon characters or famous pop culture icons such as James Dean and Marilyn Monroe are often found in poster stores and gift shops. The cable television channel Turner Classic Movies sometimes runs animated clips based on Hopper paintings prior to airing its films. Musical influences include singer-songwriter Tom Waits's 1975 live-in-the-studio album titled Nighthawks at the Diner, after the painting. In 1993, Madonna was inspired sufficiently by Hopper's 1941 painting Girlie Show that she named her world tour after it and incorporated many of the theatrical elements and mood of the painting into the show. In 2004, British guitarist John Squire (formerly of The Stone Roses) released a concept album based on Hopper's work entitled Marshall's House. Each song on the album is inspired by, and shares its title with, a painting by Hopper. Canadian rock group The Weakerthans released their album Reunion Tour in 2007 featuring two songs inspired by and named after Hopper paintings, "Sun in an Empty Room", and "Night Windows", and have also referenced him in songs such as "Hospital Vespers". Hopper's Compartment C, Car 293 inspired Polish composer Paweł Szymański's Compartment 2, Car 7 for violin, viola, cello and vibraphone (2003), as well as Hubert-Félix Thiéfaine's song Compartiment C Voiture 293 Edward Hopper 1938 (2011). Hopper's work has influenced multiple recordings by British band Orchestral Manoeuvres in the Dark. Early Sunday Morning was the inspiration for the sleeve of Crush (1985). The same band's 2013 single "Night Café" was influenced by Nighthawks and mentions Hopper by name. Seven of his paintings are referenced in the lyrics.

In poetry, numerous poems have been inspired by Hopper's paintings, typically as vivid descriptions and dramatizations; this genre is known as ekphrasis. In addition to numerous individual poems inspired by Hopper, several poets have written collections based on Hopper's paintings. The French poet Claude Esteban wrote a collection of prose poems, Soleil dans une pièce vide (Sun in an Empty room, 1991), based on forty-seven Hopper paintings from between 1921 and 1963, ending with Sun in an Empty room (1963), hence the title. The poems each dramatized a Hopper painting, imagining a story behind the scene; the book won the Prix France Culture prize in 1991. Eight of the poems – Ground Swell, Girl at Sewing Machine, Compartment C, Car 293, Nighthawks, South Carolina Morning, House by the Railroad, People in the Sun, and Roofs of Washington Square – were subsequently set to music by composer Graciane Finzi, and recorded with reading by the singer Natalie Dessay on her album Portraits of America (2016), where they were supplemented by selecting ten additional Hopper paintings, and songs from the American songbook to go with them. Similarly, the Spanish poet Ernest Farrés wrote a collection of fifty-one poems in Catalan, under the name Edward Hopper (2006, English translation 2010 by Lawrence Venuti), and James Hoggard wrote Triangles of Light: The Edward Hopper Poems (Wings Press, 2009). A collection by various poets was organized in The Poetry of Solitude: A Tribute to Edward Hopper 1995 (editor Gail Levin). Individual poems include Byron Vazakas (1957) and John Stone (1985) inspired by Early Sunday Morning, and Mary Leader inspired by Girl at Sewing Machine.

The 2016 anthology In Sunlight or in Shadow was edited by Lawrence Block and contains 17 short stories inspired by Hopper paintings, each by a different author. It includes "The Music Room" by Stephen King which was inspired by Room in New York.

=== Exhibitions ===
In 1980, the show Edward Hopper: The Art and the Artist opened at the Whitney Museum of American Art and toured to the San Francisco Museum of Modern Art, the Museum of Fine Arts in Boston, the Art Institute of Chicago, the Tate Gallery in London, the Kunsthalle Düsseldorf, and the Stedelijk Museum in Amsterdam. It was the first major retrospective to present Hopper's oil paintings alongside his preparatory sketches and drawings.

From October 13, 1989 - January 4, 1990, the Fundación Juan March, Madrid exhibited Edward Hopper, the first to be devoted to his work in Spain. The exhibit displayed over 60 works Hopper created between 1907 and 1960 and across a wide variety of mediums.

In 2004, a large selection of Hopper's paintings toured Europe, visiting the Museum Ludwig in Cologne, Germany, and the Tate Modern in London. The Tate exhibition became the second most visited in the gallery's history at the time, with more than 420,000 visitors.

In 2007, an exhibition focused on the period of Hopper's greatest achievements—from about 1925 to mid-century—was presented at the Museum of Fine Arts, Boston. The show included fifty oil paintings, thirty watercolors, and twelve prints, including Nighthawks, Chop Suey, and Lighthouse and Buildings. It was organized by the Museum of Fine Arts, the National Gallery of Art in Washington, and the Art Institute of Chicago. The catalog, Edward Hopper, by Carol Troyen, Judith A. Barter, Janet L. Comey, Elliot Bostwick Davis, and Ellen E. Roberts, was published by the Museum of Fine Arts Publishers, 2007 (ISBN 978-0-87846-712-9).

In 2010, the Fondation de l'Hermitage in Lausanne, Switzerland, held an exhibition covering Hopper's entire career, with works drawn largely from the Whitney Museum in New York City. It included paintings, watercolors, etchings, cartoons, posters, and preparatory studies for selected paintings. The exhibition had previously been displayed in Milan and Rome.

In 2012, a major exhibition opened at the Grand Palais in Paris. Divided into two parts, it covered Hopper's formative years (1900–1924), with comparisons to his contemporaries and French influences, and his mature style from 1925 onward, featuring works like House by the Railroad.

From July 25–October 26, 2015, the Carnegie Museum of Art displayed its collection of 17 Hopper works (paintings, drawings and prints) in Carnegie Museum of Art Collects Edward Hopper.

In 2020, the Fondation Beyeler in Switzerland staged an exhibition emphasizing Hopper's representations of American landscapes and cityscapes, curated in collaboration with the Whitney Museum.

In 2020-2021 The Phillips Collection exhibited Hopper in Paris: Selections from the Whitney Museum of American Art, focusing on works created during Hopper's time in Paris.

From 2022 to 2023, the Whitney Museum mounted Edward Hopper's New York, which explored the artist's relationship with the city he called home for nearly sixty years.

=== Art market ===
Works by Hopper rarely appear on the market. The artist was not prolific, painting just 366 canvases; during the 1950s, when he was in his 70s, he produced approximately five paintings a year.

Hopper's longtime dealer, Frank Rehn, who gave the artist his first solo show in 1924, sold Hotel Window (1956) to collector Olga Knoepke for $7,000 (equivalent to $80,243 in 2025) in 1957. In 1999, the Forbes Collection sold it to actor Steve Martin privately for around $10 million. In 2006, Martin sold it for $26.89 million at Sotheby's New York, an auction record for the artist at that time.

In 2013, the Pennsylvania Academy of the Fine Arts in Philadelphia put Hopper's East Wind Over Weehawken (1934) up for sale, hoping to garner $22–$28 million to establish a fund to acquire contemporary art. The painting, a street scene rendered in dark, earthy tones depicting the gabled house at 1001 Boulevard East at the corner of 49th Street in Weehawken, New Jersey, is considered one of Hopper's best works. It was acquired directly from the dealer handling the artist's paintings in 1952, fifteen years before the death of the painter. The painting sold for a record-breaking $36 million at Christie's in New York, to an anonymous telephone bidder.

In 2018, after the death of art collector Barney A. Ebsworth and the subsequent auction of many pieces from his collection, Chop Suey (1929) was sold for $91.9 million, becoming the most expensive of Hopper's works ever bought at auction.

== In popular culture ==
In addition to his influence (see § Influence), Hopper is frequently referenced in popular culture.

In 1981, Hopper's Silence, a documentary by Brian O'Doherty produced by the Whitney Museum of American Art, was shown at the New York Film Festival at Alice Tully Hall.

Austrian director Gustav Deutsch created the 2013 film Shirley – Visions of Reality based on 13 of Edward Hopper's paintings.

Other works based on or inspired by Hopper's paintings include Tom Waits's 1975 album Nighthawks at the Diner, and a 2012 series of photographs by Gail Albert Halaban.

In the book (1985, 1998) and traveling exhibition called Hopper's Places, Gail Levin located and photographed the sites for many of Hopper's paintings. In her 1985 review of a related show organized by Levin, Vivien Raynor wrote in The New York Times: "Miss Levin's deductions are invariably enlightening, as when she infers that Hopper's tendency to elongate structures was a reflection of his own great height."

New wave band Orchestral Manoeuvres in the Dark's 1985 album Crush features artwork inspired by several Hopper paintings, including Early Sunday Morning, Nighthawks, and Room in New York. The band's 2013 single "Night Café" was influenced by Nighthawks and mentions Hopper by name. Seven of his paintings are referenced in the lyrics.

In the 1999 Hey Arnold! episode Helga on the Couch, Hopper's 1943 painting Summertime is featured; the titular character of the episode criticizes Hopper as "a little simple" and comments on his "deal with women."

The New York City Opera staged the East Coast premiere of Stewart Wallace's "Hopper's Wife"—a 1997 chamber opera about an imagined marriage between Edward Hopper and the gossip columnist Hedda Hopper—at Harlem Stage in 2016.

Irish novelist Christine Dwyer Hickey published a novel, The Narrow Land, in 2019 in which Edward and Jo Hopper were central characters.

Paul Weller included a song named "Hopper" on his 2017 album A Kind Revolution.

== Selected works ==
Title	Medium	Date	Collection	Dimensions	Image
Girl at Sewing Machine	Oil on canvas	1921	Thyssen-Bornemisza Museum	19 in × 18 in (48 cm × 46 cm)	A woman sits at a sewing machine near a window in a softly lit room
House by the Railroad	Oil on canvas	1925	Museum of Modern Art	24 in × 29 in (61.0 cm × 73.7 cm)	A Victorian house is seen partially obscured by train tracks in the foreground
Automat	Oil on canvas	1927	Des Moines Art Center	28.13 in × 36 in (71.5 cm × 91.4 cm)	A woman sits alone at a table with a coffee cup in a brightly lit automat
Manhattan Bridge Loop	Oil on canvas	1928	Addison Gallery of American Art	35 in × 60 in (88.9 cm × 152 cm)	A cityscape with buildings and a bridge structure
Chop Suey	Oil on canvas	1929	Private collection	32 in × 38 in (81.3 cm × 96.5 cm)	Two women sit at a small table inside a sunlit Chinese restaurant
Early Sunday Morning	Oil on canvas	1930	Whitney Museum of American Art	35.2 in × 60.3 in (89.4 cm × 153 cm)	An empty city street lined with storefronts in the early morning light
New York Movie	Oil on canvas	1939	Museum of Modern Art	32.25 in × 40.13 in (81.9 cm × 102 cm)	An usherette stands pensively in a theater lobby while patrons sit in the darkened auditorium
Office at Night	Oil on canvas	1940	Walker Art Center, Minneapolis	22.19 in × 25.13 in (56.36 cm × 63.83 cm)	A man works at his desk while a woman stands at a filing cabinet under dramatic lighting
Nighthawks	Oil on canvas	1942	Art Institute of Chicago	33.13 in × 60 in (84.2 cm × 152.4 cm)	Several people sit at the counter of a brightly lit diner at night
Hotel Lobby	Oil on canvas	1943	Indianapolis Museum of Art	32.25 in × 40.75 in (82 cm × 103 1/2 cm)	A man and two women sit in a hotel lobby with stark lighting and subdued tones
Morning Sun	Oil on canvas	1952	Columbus Museum of Art	28.1 in × 40.1 in (71.4 cm × 102 cm)	A woman sits on a bed gazing out of a sunlit window
