= Intermission (Hopper) =

1963 painting by Edward Hopper

- Artist: Edward Hopper
- Year: 1963
- Medium: Oil on canvas
- Dimensions: 40 by 60 inches (100 cm × 150 cm)
- Location: San Francisco Museum of Modern Art

Intermission is a 1963 painting by American realist Edward Hopper (1882–1967). It is a late period painting completed between March and April at his home and studio in Washington Square Park, in the Greenwich Village neighborhood of Lower Manhattan, New York City, four years before his death at age 84. The work depicts a woman in a theater wearing a blue and black dress and black shoes, sitting by herself in a green aisle seat near a blue wall. It is one of the largest paintings ever completed by Hopper, and is his penultimate theater-themed work, followed by Two Comedians (1966), his last painting. It was acquired by the San Francisco Museum of Modern Art in 2012.

== Background ==
Edward Hopper (1882–1967) was a lifelong fan of the theater and cinema, interests that went back to his early childhood and were later encouraged by his art teacher, Robert Henri (1865–1929). Along with his wife, Josephine, Hopper regularly attended theatrical productions and kept detailed notes of every performance. They were also patrons of the Theatre Guild, the founders of which originated with the Washington Square Players, a former theater troupe with which Josephine used to perform; she was also friendly with the members. The Hoppers had eclectic taste in the performing arts, ranging from modern drama, classics, and even experimental theater.

Notable works and subjects with the theme of theater and cinema in Hopper's paintings include Solitary Figure in a Theater (1902–1904), At the Theater (1916–1922), Two on the Aisle (1927), The Balcony (1928), The Circle Theater (1936), The Sheridan Theater (1937), New York Movie (1939), First Row Orchestra (1951), and his last work, Two Comedians (1966).

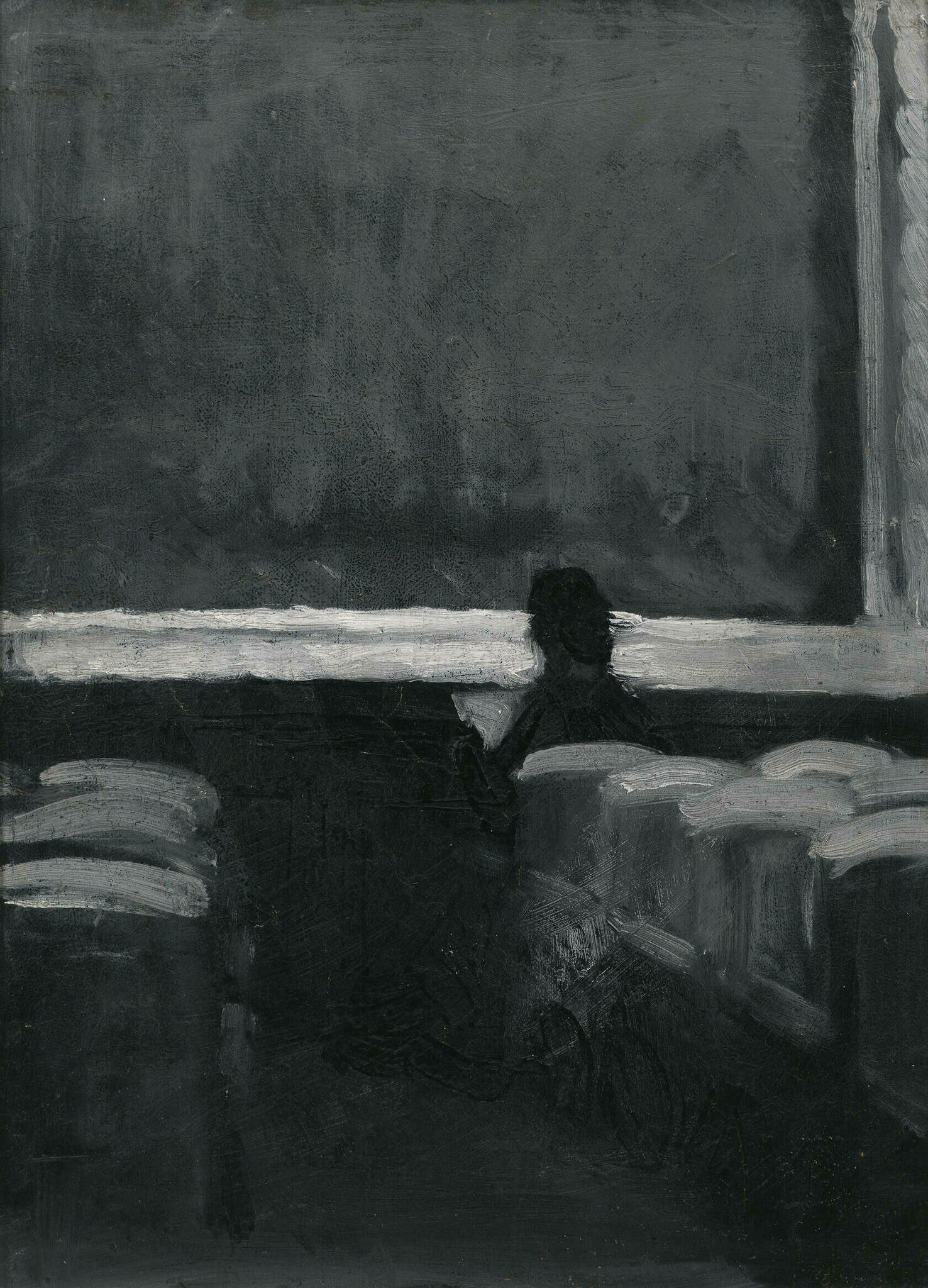
Solitary Figure in a Theater (1902–1904)

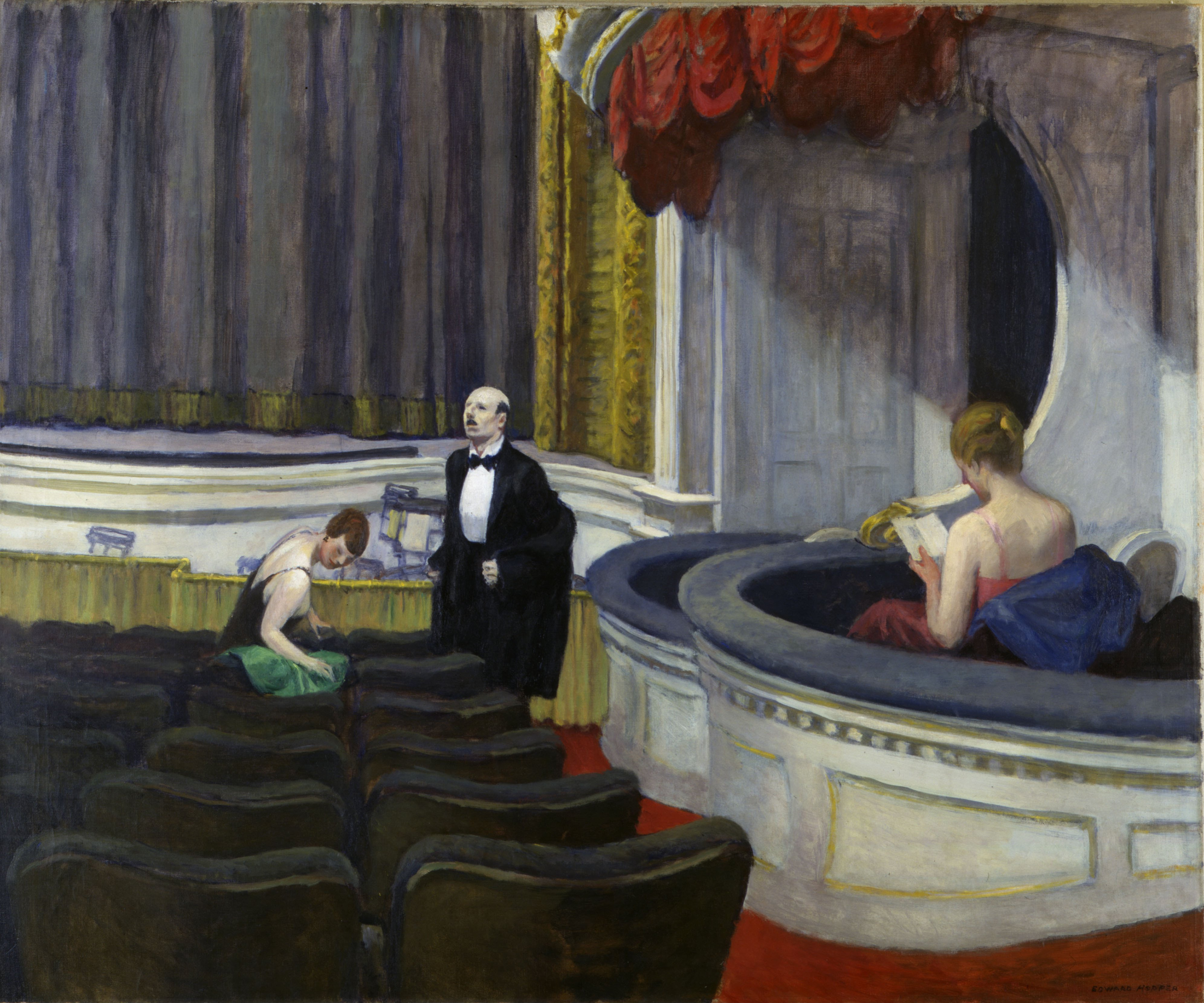
Two on the Aisle (1927)

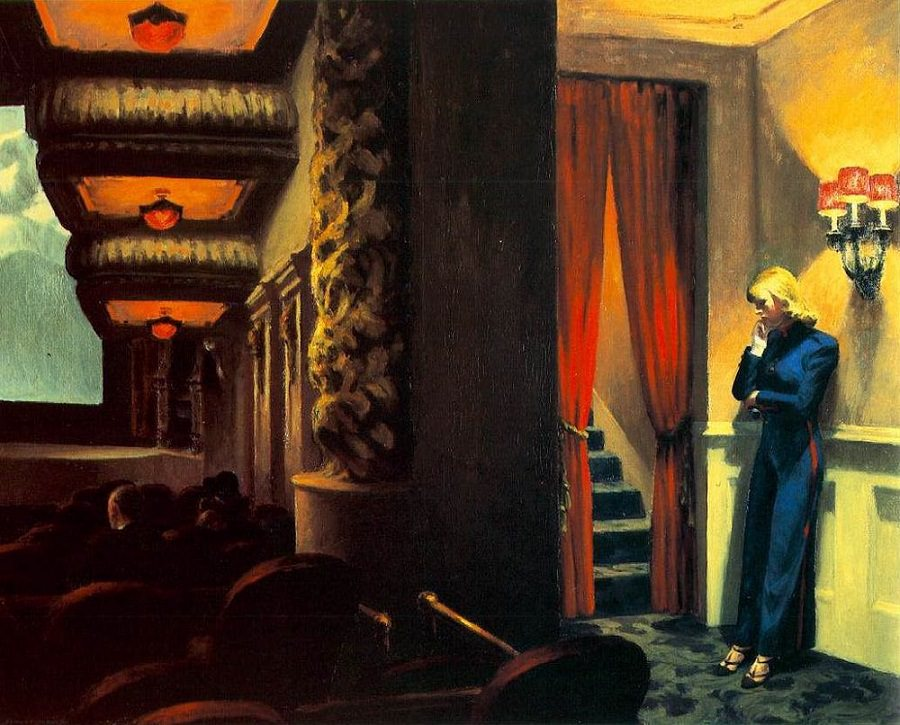
New York Movie (1939)

== Development ==
In 1963, Hopper expressed interest in continuing his series of paintings set in a theater. His original plan was to paint inside of a movie theater after hours when it was closed and there were no people around. Josephine shared this information with American historian James Flexner, who personally approached the president of a chain of theaters and arranged a deal, only to have Hopper back out. "Hopper had his idea so clearly in his mind that his presence in an actual theater became unnecessary", writes art historian Gail Levin. One sketch shows that Hopper considered adding another figure in the third row of seats. In the final painting. Hopper made a preliminary or compositional sketch (ébauche) in pencil lines, which remains evident in the edges of the stage and the proscenium arch in the final painting. At 40 by 60 inches (100 cm × 150 cm), Intermission is one of Hopper's largest paintings. It was completed between March and April 1963 at his New York home and studio in Washington Square Park, just four years before his death at age 84.

== Description ==
A woman sits alone among empty seats in a theater; the curtain and the exit door are both closed. The house lights are on, indicating a break in the performance. The lone woman wears a blue and black dress and black shoes, and sits in a green aisle seat near a blue wall below a balcony.

== Interpretation ==
Art historian Ivo Kranzfelder places the painting within the context of the metaphor of the theatrum mundi, the ancient idea that the world is a theater where people are the characters in a drama. Kranzfelder believes Hopper used this idea throughout his theater series beginning with Solitary Figure in a Theater. Levin writes that Hopper "saw the theater as a metaphor for life, and himself as a kind of stage director, setting up scenes to paint based on events he saw take place around him, casting his characters from types he observed." Hopper and Josephine often created backstories for the characters in his paintings. In Intermission, Hopper named the woman depicted in the theater "Nora". Levin and Studs Terkel have noted that "Nora" appears to be a loner, remaining pensively in her seat during intermission when other audience members have stepped out. According to Josephine, Hopper said "Nora is on the way of becoming an 'egg head'. An efficient secretary or prized chatelaine of big house." Levin notes that Hopper's description of "Nora" came close to describing Josephine, as she was somewhat of an egghead and also played the role of secretary and châtelain of both Hopper's South Truro home and studio and their Washington Square property. Hopper "had learned to use light as only a master stage craftsman could to create drama", writes Levin. "Although his dramas were imaginary, his directing was inspired. Even in his habit of having Jo pose for all the women he painted, he acted like a director giving a favorite actress many roles to play. Jo, who had actually acted in theater, was well prepared for her duties."

=== COVID-19 pandemic ===
Intermission received renewed interest and attention at the beginning of the COVID-19 pandemic as part of an internet meme about the impact of lockdowns and social distancing. On March 16, 2020, writer Michael Tisserand tweeted "We are all Edward Hopper paintings now", along with images of four Hopper paintings: New York Office (1962), Sunlight in a Cafeteria (1958), Intermission (1963), and Office in a Small City (1953). The tweet went viral, sparking a global conversation about Hopper's paintings and the loneliness and isolation people were experiencing due to pandemic health measures.

Art critic Jonathan Jones explored Tisserand's idea after seeing it on WhatsApp. In an article for The Guardian, Jones compared the relevance of Hopper and the "loneliness and alienation of modern life" in his 1950s and 1960s paintings to contemporary society caught up by the coronavirus restrictions. Trying to make sense of the meme, Jones describes the succession of images as "a woman alone in a deserted cinema [Intermission], a man bereft in his modern apartment [Office in a Small City], a lonely shop worker [New York Office] and people sitting far apart at tables for one in a diner [Sunlight in a Cafeteria]..." Hopper's images of solitude and loneliness connect to people during the pandemic era, Jones argues, because when one loses the liberties we take for granted, loneliness as Hopper painted it is the only thing remaining.

Biochemist and art essayist Joseph L. Goldstein argues that Hopper was the artist who best foreshadowed and represented the isolation and separation experienced by the general public dealing with COVID-19. Hopper's art, writes Goldstein, "speaks to the spirit of the pandemic's quarantine culture." Goldstein cites Hopper's portrayal of "people who sit alone in bleak diners, motel rooms, and theaters or who stare out of the bay windows of their apartments". Hopper expert Gail Levin did not see Tisserand's meme until December 2020, at which point it caught her attention after spreading to Facebook. It inspired her to write Edward Hopper's Loneliness, an essay exploring the influence of the 1918–1920 flu pandemic on Hopper's work.

== Cinematic recreation ==
Austrian filmmaker Gustav Deutsch recreated a live action version of Intermission as part of the experimental feature film Shirley: Visions of Reality (2013), which connects 13 Hopper paintings together using "nearly static tableaux vivants" in key scenes to mimic each painting. The backstory linking the paintings together concerns a New York actress (portrayed by Stephanie Cumming) in the 1930s through the 1960s. In the scene that depicts Intermission, Shirley is shown sitting in a movie theater watching Une aussi longue Absence (1961), a French film by Henri Colpi, a film that Hopper had actually watched in his real life. Deutsch said he was interested in exploring the history of film with Shirley, noting that the tableau vivant was a 19th-century precursor to filmmaking which originally used live people to model influential paintings.

== Provenance ==
Intermission was acquired from a private collector by the San Francisco Museum of Modern Art (SFMOMA) in 2012, made possible by gifts from the Schwab and Fisher families. As part of the transaction, the SFMOMA deaccessioned Hopper's Bridle Path (1939) and put it up for auction. It sold for $10.4 million in May of that same year.

== See also ==
- List of works by Edward Hopper
