= Girl at Sewing Machine =

Painting by Edward Hopper

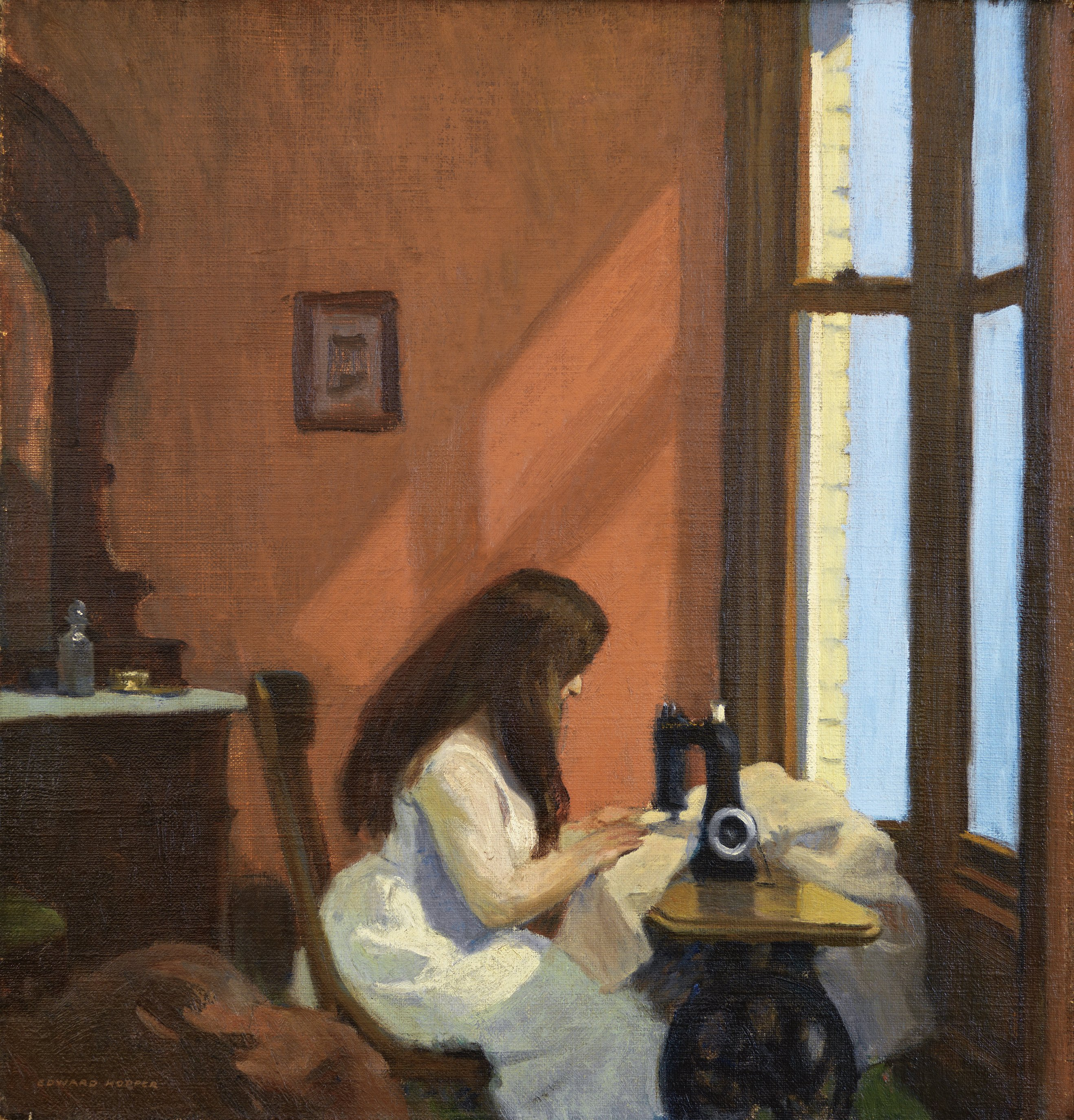
- Artist: Edward Hopper
- Year: 1921
- Medium: oil on canvas
- Dimensions: 48 cm × 46 cm (19 in × 18 in)
- Location: Thyssen-Bornemisza Museum, Madrid

Girl at Sewing Machine is an oil-on-canvas painting by the American artist Edward Hopper, executed in 1921, now in the Thyssen-Bornemisza Museum in Madrid, Spain. It portrays a young woman sitting at a sewing machine facing a window on a beautiful sunny day. The location appears to be New York City as is evident from the yellow bricks in the window. The exterior vantage point, although present, only aids in putting the interior activity in perspective.

It is one of the first of Hopper's many "window paintings". Hopper's repeated decision to pose a young woman against her sewing is said to be a commentary on solitude.

The painting is the inspiration for Mary Leader's poem of the same name.

== See also ==
- List of works by Edward Hopper
