= Chop Suey (Hopper) =

1929 painting by Edward Hopper

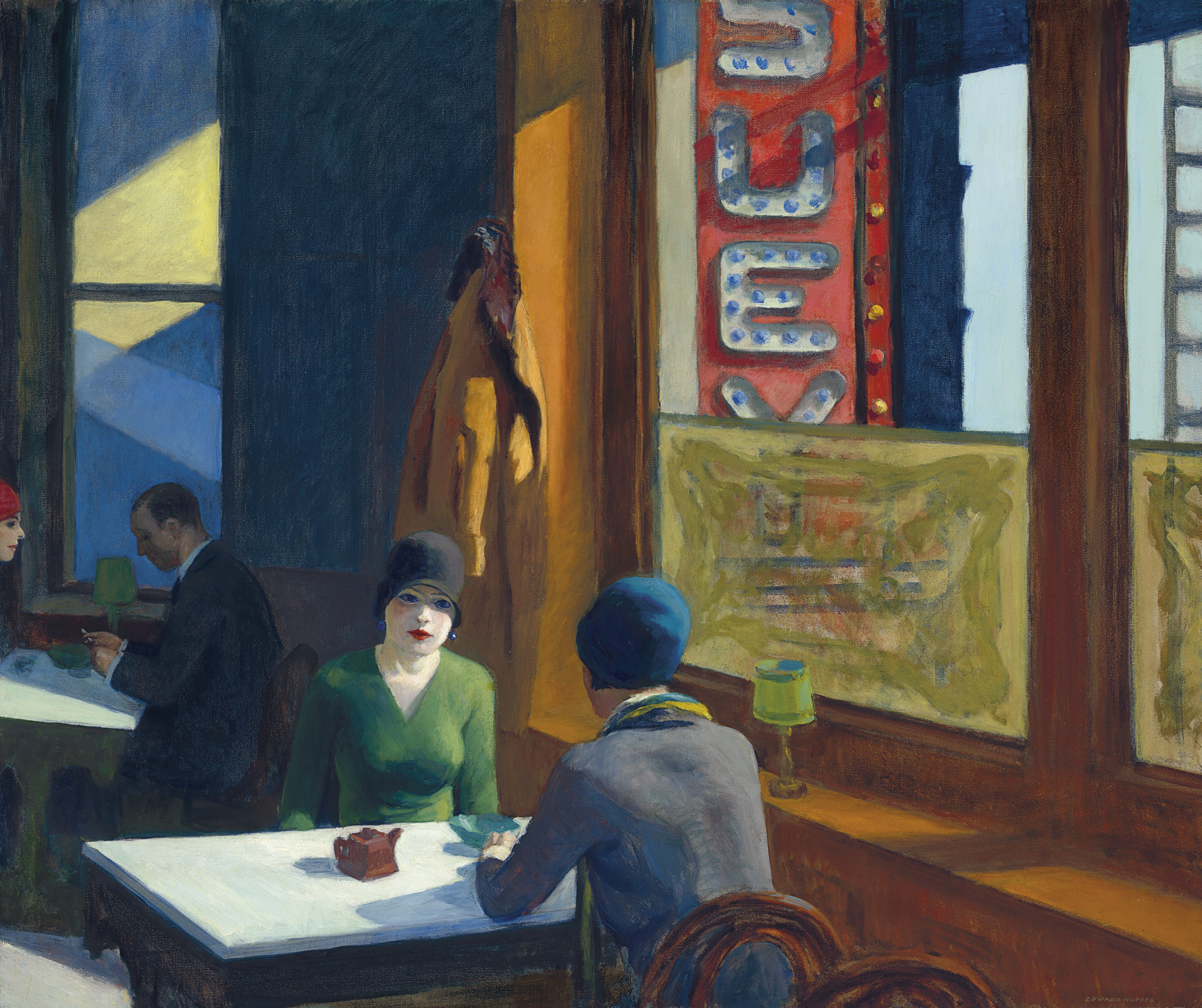
- Artist: Edward Hopper
- Year: 1929
- Medium: oil paint
- Dimensions: 81.3 cm (32.0 in) × 96.5 cm (38.0 in)

Chop Suey (1929) is an oil painting on canvas by the American artist Edward Hopper. The foreground of the work portrays two women in conversation at a restaurant. In November 2018, it was sold at $92 million, a record price for the artist's work.

== Subject ==
The scene depicts two women at a table in a restaurant with another couple in the background. The only features being shown in particular detail are the painted woman's face, the coat hanging above her, her companion's back [to the viewer], the features of the couple in the background, the tea pot on the table, the masked lower window panel, and the restaurant sign outside. These are all features that would bring a sensory element (besides sight) to the memory painted: the buzzing noise of the outside light, the voices of the people in the background, the texture of the coat, the taste of the tea and smell of the cigarette smoke (held by the man), and the muddled light from the masked window.

Edward Hopper's artwork is known for its realistic scenes that touch themes of isolation and self-being rather than a narrative context. He often described his art as a "transcription [of his] most intimate impressions of nature", meaning he related the process of painting to that of memory. This idea could further be described in another way as when, for example, something is drawn from a personal memory, certain details can be remembered but everything outside the primary focus is blank background. Chop Suey captures this concept of memory, making the viewer focus on particular elements of sensory iconography whilst depicting a theme of isolation due to self being.

== Interpretation ==
According to art scholar David Anfam, one "striking detail of Chop Suey is that its female subject faces her doppelgänger." Others have pointed out it would not be so unusual for two women to be wearing similar hats, and that it is presumptuous to claim doppelgängers when one subject's face is not visible to the viewer. The painting has an interior subject matter, being inside of a cafe, and does not focus on any one given figure. As with many of Hopper's works, the painting features close attention to the effects of light on his subjects.

By detailing only the sensory iconography, the painting takes a step back from pure realism, as if by painting the complete memory one would destroy the fine details that make it actively realistic. Rolf G. Renner, author of Hopper, states that "…part of what [Hopper’s] pictures are 'about' is that death or decay which all paintings in some sense represent, since they destroy the immediacy of perception through the transformation into an image".

Although the scene of the painting is a social environment there is a sense of loneliness prevalent. The woman in green facing the viewer is sitting with her companion but she does not seem to be interacting with her, and the man in the background looks withdrawn from the woman he sits across from. Every human figure is isolated and withdrawn from one another and reserved within themselves. This is portrayed with hidden or obscured faces, retracting a human essence from the figures. This further applies to the woman in detail; even though we get a full view of her face there is a detachment to her because of her stark makeup.

The alabaster skin with the bold rouge and painted lip suggest only the impression of a woman, similar to a doll. Normally in context with the style of the era (late 1920s), this could be taken as a trendy and lively style, "the women's tight-fitting sweaters, cloche hats, and made-up faces, which in a previous era would have marked them as sexually available, had become mainstream". But Hopper negates that by making the woman's face the same value of white as other blank features in the background, thus hollowing out her human essence. The viewer interprets her to be "spacing out" or listening un-intently rather than making eye contact and interacting with the viewer, as if she is not focused on her surroundings.

The composition of Chop Suey further encompasses Hopper's concept memory as opposed to complete realism. The balance is held across the middle section of the painting with there being more un-detailed areas just above the eye line of sight; these areas are marked with rougher brush marks. The negative/un-detailed space in the background further add to this because the eye simply passes over them and focuses more on the details presented. These spaces are simple because they are the background features that were not committed to memory. There is "weight" held in the presence of details contained between the figures at the tables all the way to the details in the design of the sign outside, the hanging jacket and the lower window covering. This gives the effect of the viewer seeing the scene and all the important aspects, ignoring the exterior context. This is described in an article by USA Today Magazine: "The brief interruption in action, the mask-like face of the protagonist, and the abstract geometries in the windows contribute to the sense that the unfolding narrative is not about these specific actions or this place, but rather about a modern state of being".

With this in mind the viewer can assume the narrative behind this particular memory. In a bibliography by Gail Levin, the location of Chop Suey is described as "[recalling] the inexpensive, second floor Chinese restaurant the Hoppers had been frequenting in Columbus Circle". This might explain the primary focus on the woman and the dullness of the surroundings. If it was a place Edward Hopper had frequently visited then there would be no reason to concentrate on the surroundings, but rather the moment of the scene. His wife and frequent model Jo Hopper most likely modeled for the three female figures.

== Sale ==
Barney A. Ebsworth owned the painting and had promised it to the Seattle Art Museum. However, at his death, ownership transferred to his estate. In November 2018, the painting sold for $92 million, a new record for a work by the artist.

== See also ==
- List of works by Edward Hopper
- List of most expensive paintings

== Other sources ==
- Oral history interview with Edward Hopper. 1959 June 17. Archives of American Art, Smithsonian Institution.
- Chop Suey at The Art Institute in Chicago
- High Resolution Image of Chop Suey
