= Barney A. Ebsworth =

American corporate executive and art collector (1934–2018)

Barney A. Ebsworth (July 14, 1934 – April 9, 2018) was an American corporate executive and art collector. He was one of the initial investors in the Build-A-Bear Workshop and was a pioneer in the travel industry. Ebsworth died on April 9, 2018.

== Art collection ==
Ebsworth was a trustee of the St. Louis Art Museum and the Seattle Art Museum, a commissioner of the American Art Museum and Smithsonian Institution and a member of the Trustees Council and Co-Chairman of Collectors Committee of the National Gallery of Art in Washington D.C.

At a Christie's auction in 1997, Ebsworth purchased Wayne Thiebaud's Bakery Counter (1962), one of the artist's largest early still lifes, for $1.7 million; at the time, this was a record for the artist. In 2010, he sold Andy Warhol's Big Campbell's Soup Can with Can Opener (Vegetable), a 1962 painting with a can opener cutting into the signature can, for $23.8 million to raise money to finance a church designed by the Japanese architect Tadao Ando. He also owned the Edward Hopper painting Chop Suey (1929) and had promised it to the Seattle Art Museum. However, at his death, ownership transferred to his estate. In November 2018, the painting sold for a record $92 million.
