= Early Sunday Morning =

1930 painting by Edward Hopper

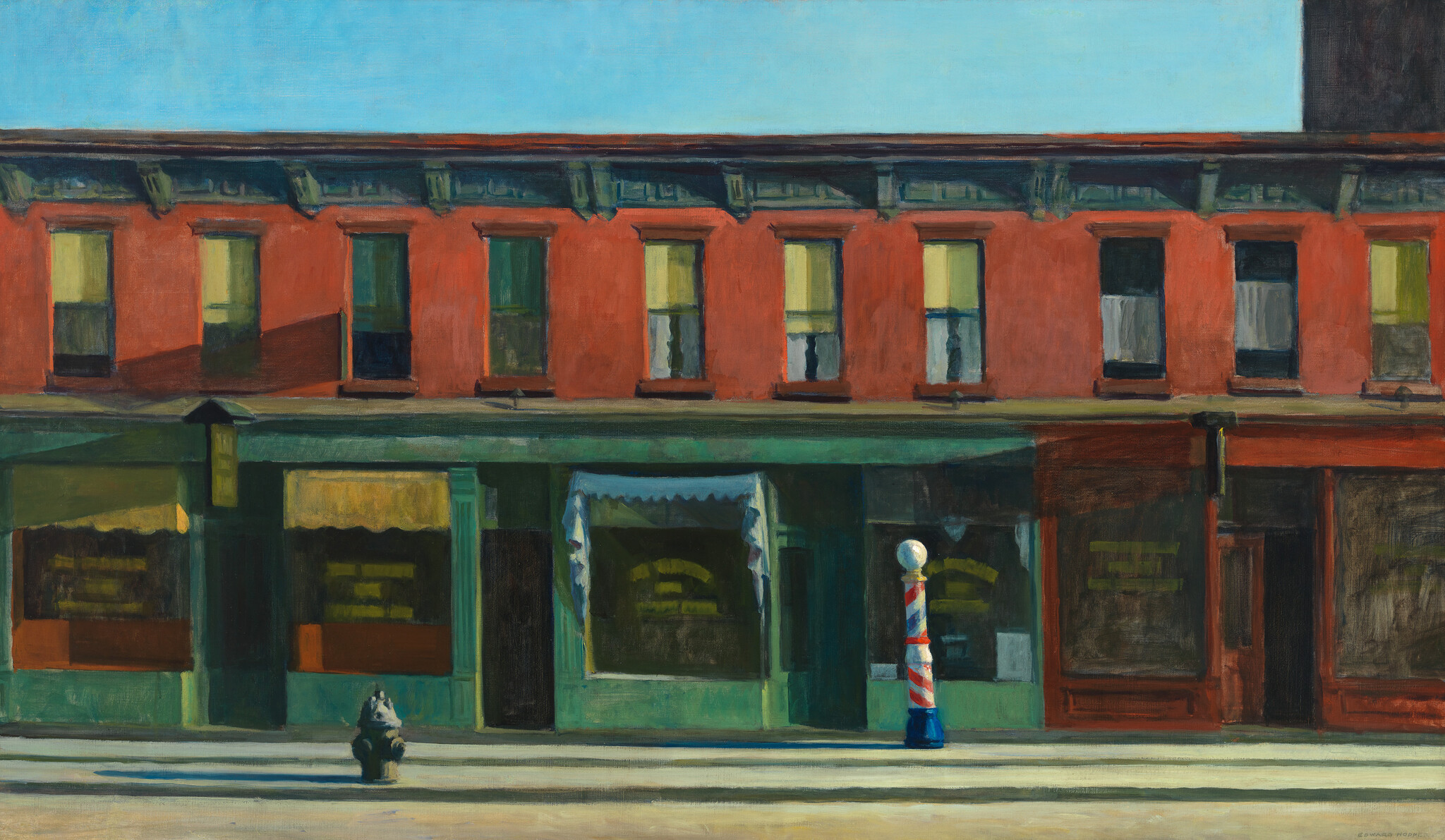
- Artist: Edward Hopper
- Year: 1930
- Medium: oil paint, canvas
- Dimensions: 89.4 cm (35.2 in) × 153 cm (60 in)
- Location: United States
- Accession: 31.426

Early Sunday Morning is a 1930 oil painting by American artist Edward Hopper.

== Description ==
The painting portrays the small businesses and shops of Seventh Avenue in New York City shortly after sunrise. It shows a cloudless sky over a long, red building. A red and blue striped barber pole sits in front of one of the doorways on the right side of the sidewalk, and a green fire hydrant is on the left. The bleak, empty street and storefronts are said to be a representation of the dire state of the city during the Great Depression.

Despite the title, Hopper said that the painting was not necessarily based on a Sunday view. The painting was originally titled Seventh Avenue Shops. The addition of "Sunday" to the title was "tacked on by someone else".

The image was based on a building nearby Hopper's studio. It is said to be "almost a literal translation of Seventh Avenue"; however, a few minor details were changed, like decreasing the size of the doorways and making the lettering on the storefronts less clear.

== Provenance ==
It is currently in the collection of the Whitney Museum of American Art.

The piece was originally sold to the Whitney for $2,000. It was purchased with funds from Gertrude Vanderbilt Whitney just a few months after it was painted, and would go on to become a part of the Whitney's founding collection.

== Critical response ==
Scholar Karal Ann Marling notes that Edward Hopper's work "is a prelude to the wakeful coffee urns and to those who tend them to defeat the night". According to the American art critic Blake Gopnik, "The painting’s bone-deep conservatism, and its obvious, almost polemical resistance to the most ambitious European art of its day. In the midst of the depression in America, that conservatism is as much a part of the painting’s subject as the closed shops it depicts." The painting has become the inspiration for other works of art. Examples include Byron Vazakas' poem Early Sunday Morning and John Stone's poem of the same name.

== See also ==
- List of works by Edward Hopper
