= Morning Sun (painting) =

1952 painting by Edward Hopper

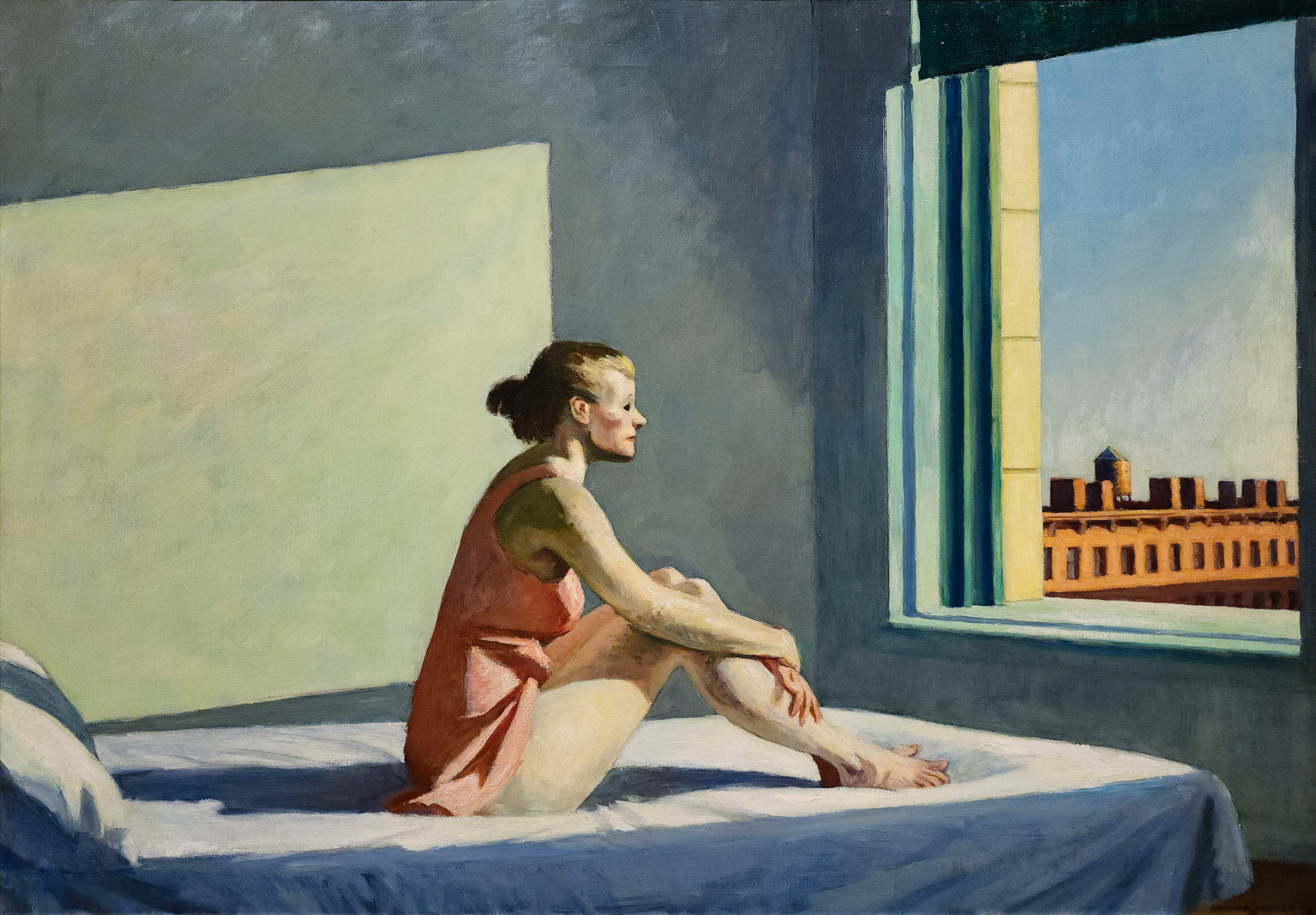
- Artist: Edward Hopper
- Year: 1952
- Medium: Oil on canvas
- Movement: Realism
- Location: Columbus Museum of Art

Morning Sun is a 1952 realist painting by Edward Hopper. Hopper often painted scenes of everyday American life in the 20th century.

It joined the Columbus Museum of Art's collection in 1954, when it was bought for $3,500, equivalent to $41,961 in 2025. Morning Sun has been on loan from the Columbus Museum of Art a number of times; it has been to museums in Japan, Mexico, France, England, Switzerland, and Germany.

== Description ==
In Morning Sun, a woman is shown sitting on a bed, facing sunlight coming in from the window. She is wearing a coral-colored dress and her hair is in a simple bun. Her face, in profile, has a contemplative expression.

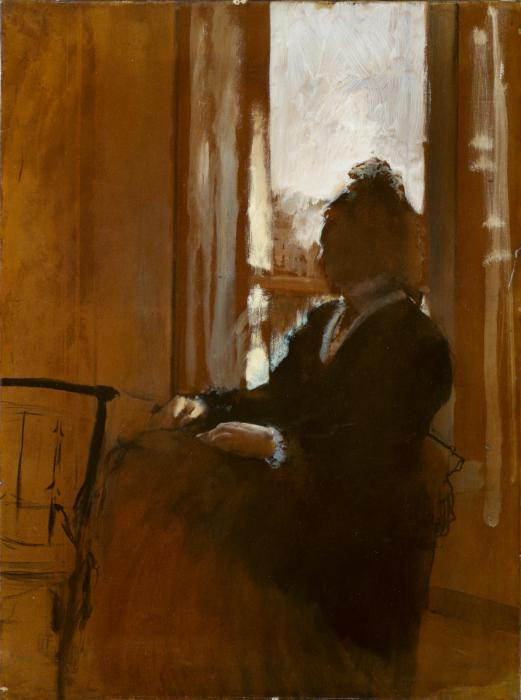
Degas's Woman at a Window, a possible inspiration for Morning Sun

The woman is Hopper's wife, Jo, who modeled for most of his paintings. At the time of the painting, she was 69 years old, yet she is depicted in an idealized, youthful form.

=== Lighting ===
Hopper was known for his expert use of light to frame his subjects. In Morning Sun, bright yellow sunlight filters in from an open window. There are shadows cast under the woman and on the wall, creating depth in the painting.

== Analysis ==
Hopper's paintings often depict one solitary figure. The loneliness evoked in his paintings create an uncanny urban scene.

The painting may be a reference to Edgar Degas’s Woman at a Window. It is known that his wife Jo gifted him a book on Degas's art before he created Morning Sun. Both Degas's and Hopper's paintings feature a woman whose profile is highlighted by a nearby window.

== Similar Hopper works ==
Hopper first painted a woman in profile facing a window in his 1950 painting Cape Cod Morning. Two years later, he painted Morning Sun. In both paintings, the female subject seems to embrace the light. It shines onto her through a window and highlights her frame.

The subject matter of a lone woman was revisited by Hopper in his 1961 painting A Woman in the Sun. This painting, done nearly a decade later than the first two, depicts the female figure as nude and much older. She is now less eager to embrace the sunlight, and the painting feels voyeuristic.

== Reception ==
The painting has been called "one of the ultimate images of summer" by NPR journalist Susan Stamberg.

During the beginning of the COVID-19 pandemic, many people found Hopper's paintings relatable, as they depict isolated cityscape scenes. Morning Sun, in particular, received renewed interest in 2020.

== In popular culture ==
Playwright Simon Stephens was inspired by the painting in writing his play Morning Sun, named after the painting and featuring a scene with the work in the show. The production premiered Off-Broadway in 2021 produced by Manhattan Theatre Club and starring Edie Falco.
