= New York Movie =

Painting by Edward Hopper

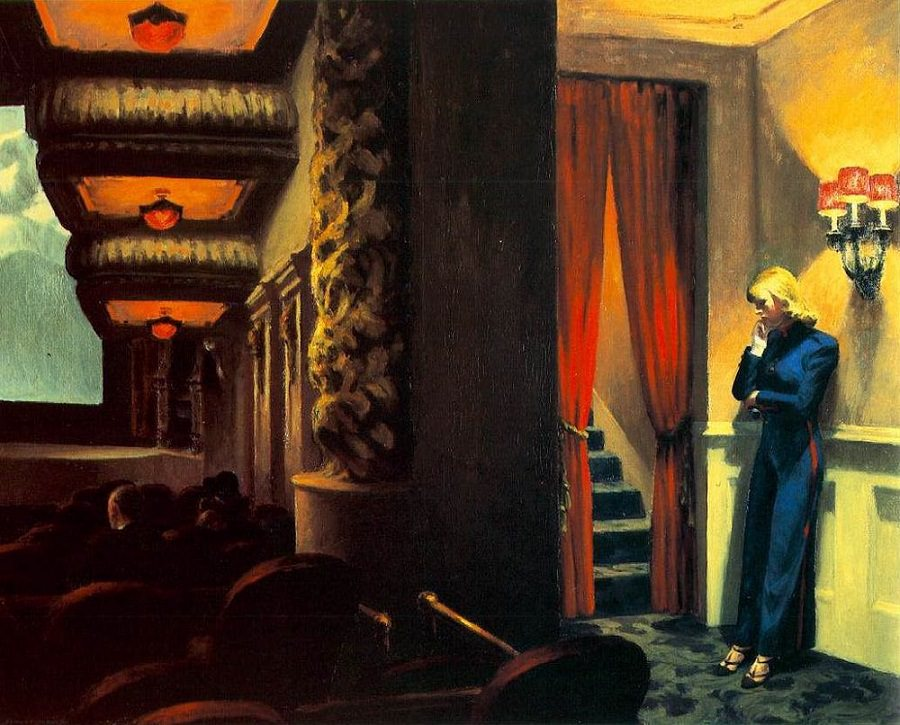
- Artist: Edward Hopper
- Year: 1939
- Medium: Oil on canvas
- Dimensions: 32.25 in × 40.125 in (81.92 cm × 101.92 cm)
- Location: Museum of Modern Art, New York City
- Accession: 396.1941

New York Movie is a 1939 oil-on-canvas painting by American artist Edward Hopper. Begun in December 1938 and completed in January 1939, the painting depicts a nearly empty movie theater with a few patrons and a contemplative usherette. Known for its sophisticated depiction of multiple light sources, New York Movie is regarded as one of Hopper's most accomplished works.

== Inspiration ==
New York Movie is a composite painting, combining elements from multiple sources. Josephine Hopper, Edward's wife and an accomplished painter in her own right before their marriage, served as a model for the usherette, posing under a lamp in the hallway of their apartment. Unlike many artists of his time, Hopper did not paint women with obvious sexual appeal. Instead, he sought to portray them with honesty to both their external appearance and internal experience.

Some scholars suggest that New York Movie functions as a counterpart to Édouard Manet's 1882 painting A Bar at the Folies-Bergère, with the usherette as a modern version of the barmaid, both women appearing introspective and emotionally detached from their surroundings.

While the theater in the painting is Hopper's invention, he drew inspiration from several real New York City venues, including the Palace, the Globe, the Republic, and the Strand. He made over fifty preparatory sketches of these theaters before beginning the painting.

Hopper was fascinated by film and reportedly spent full days at the theater when experiencing creative blocks. Despite that connection, the painting emphasizes solitude and introspection, even though theaters of the era could hold thousands.

Some critics argue that the usherette's disconnection from the film evokes sympathy from viewers, while others suggest she is absorbed in thought only because she is separated from the movie itself, a possible critique of film audiences at the time. Still others interpret the painting, along with Hopper's broader work, as an acknowledgment of the warmth and quiet persistence of the human spirit amid the alienation of modern urban life.

Hopper also drew compositional and lighting inspiration from Edgar Degas, especially his painting Interior, which similarly conveys nocturnal atmosphere and psychological complexity.

== Identification of the film ==
The specific film being shown in New York Movie is not definitively known. However, Hopper's wife and fellow painter, Josephine Hopper, noted in her records that the image on the screen depicted "fragments of snow-covered mountains."

Art historian Teresa A. Carbone has suggested that the 1937 film Lost Horizon is the most likely candidate, as it prominently features imagery of snow-capped Himalayas, consistent with Josephine Hopper's description.

== Exhibition history ==
New York Movie has been exhibited at both the Museum of Modern Art and the Whitney Museum of American Art as part of major Edward Hopper retrospectives curated by art historian Gail Levin.

The painting was included in the traveling exhibition Edward Hopper: The Art and the Artist, which originated at the Whitney and later appeared at the Hayward Gallery in London, the Stedelijk Museum Amsterdam, the Städtische Kunsthalle in Düsseldorf, the Art Institute of Chicago, and the San Francisco Museum of Modern Art. It has also featured in additional Hopper retrospectives at the Whitney, the Art Institute of Chicago, the Detroit Institute of Arts, and the Saint Louis Art Museum.

The painting is now part of the permanent collection at the Museum of Modern Art, where it is displayed in the Alfred H. Barr, Jr. Galleries. It was acquired through an anonymous donation.

== In popular culture ==
New York Movie has influenced both poetry and film.

In poetry, several writers have drawn from Hopper's depiction of solitude and the reflective mood of the usherette. American poet Joseph Stanton wrote a poem titled "Edward Hopper's New York Movie" in his collection Imaginary Museum: Poems on Art. English poet and professor Gerald Locklin also wrote a poem titled "edward hopper; new york movie, 1939." More recently, poet Jacks DeWitt published "Hopper: New York Movie" in The American Poetry Review in 2012.

The painting is frequently noted for its dramatic use of lighting and shadows, and it has been cited as an influence on several film noir works, as well as on films that explore themes of female isolation.

Director Sam Mendes cited New York Movie as a visual influence for his 2002 film Road to Perdition, particularly noting how the partial obscuring of the usherette's face contributes to a sense of loneliness and poetic atmosphere. Quentin Tarantino's 2009 film Inglourious Basterds features a scene in which the character Shosanna stands alone in a theater lobby, her posture and lighting echoing Hopper's composition.

The 1972 film Fat City was also influenced by New York Movie. Production designer Richard Sylbert drew on Hopper's painting, along with Nighthawks, to guide the film's muted color palette and mood.

== See also ==
- List of works by Edward Hopper
