= Two Comedians =

Painting by Edward Hopper

Two Comedians is a 1966 oil on canvas painting by the American artist Edward Hopper. It was his final painting, executed one year before his death in 1967.

In the painting, Hopper depicted himself and his wife, Josephine Nivison, on stage in pantomime costume taking a final bow.

The work was once owned by Frank Sinatra. It is now in the permanent collection of the Bruce Museum in Greenwich, Connecticut.

== See also ==
- List of works by Edward Hopper
