= A Clean, Well-Lighted Place =

1933 short story by Ernest Hemingway

- Short story by Ernest Hemingway
- Country: United States
- Language: English
- Genre: Short story

Publication
- Publication type: Periodical
- Media type: Print
- Publication date: 1933

"A Clean, Well-Lighted Place" is a short story by American author Ernest Hemingway, first published in Scribner's Magazine in 1933; it was also included in his collection Winner Take Nothing (1933).

== Plot synopsis ==
Late at night, a deaf old man is the sole patron in a cafe. Nearby, two waiters, one young, the other older, talk about him. When the old man orders another brandy, the young waiter purposely overfills his glass. The waiters speculate about the old man's recent suicide attempt. The young waiter wants the patron to go home, and complains that he never gets to bed before three o'clock, while the older waiter is more understanding of the old man's plight. Again the old man asks for another brandy, but this time the young man tells him the cafe is closed. After he leaves, the waiters resume their discussion. The young waiter wants to hurry home to his wife; the older waiter is more thoughtful. He muses on youth and observes that he is now one "of those who like to stay late in the cafe," likening himself to the old man. He mentions the importance to some people of having "a clean, well-lighted place" in which they can spend time. After the young waiter leaves, the older waiter reflects on the emptiness of his own life and returns to his home and his insomnia.

== Historical reaction by other authors ==
James Joyce once remarked: "He [Hemingway] has reduced the veil between literature and life, which is what every writer strives to do. Have you read 'A Clean, Well-Lighted Place'?...It is masterly. Indeed, it is one of the best short stories ever written..."

== Trivia ==
- In A.E. Hotchner's biography Papa Hemingway, Hemingway is quoted saying that this might be his favorite story.
