= Gail Levin (art historian) =

American art historian, biographer, artist, and Distinguished Professor

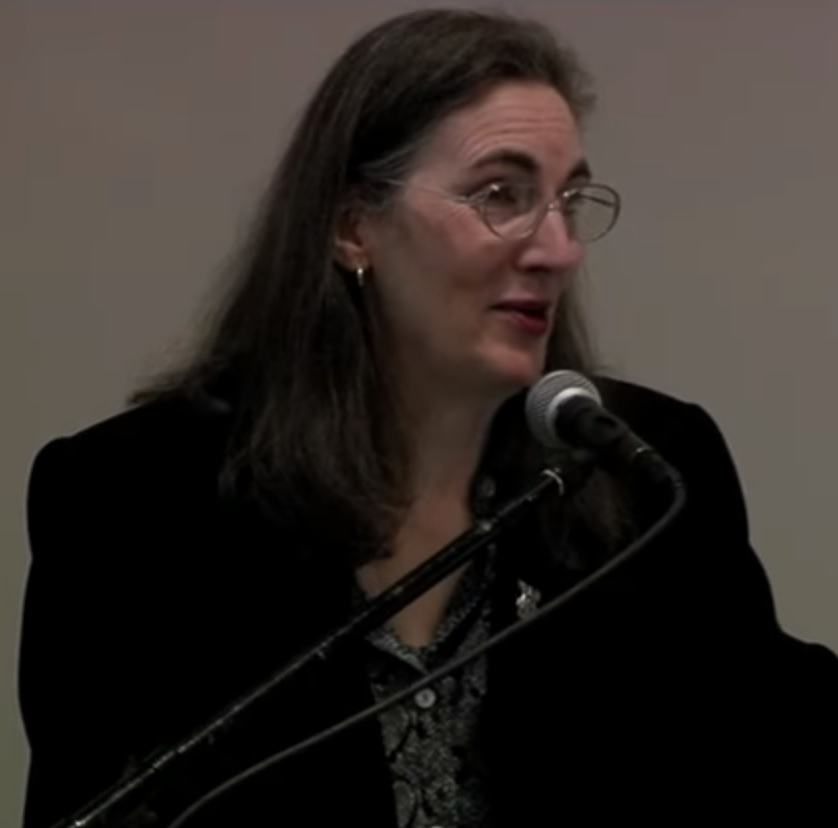
- Gail Levin speaking at the Elizabeth A. Sackler Center for Feminist Art in 2011
- Occupations: Art historian, artist
- Writing career
- Subjects: Art of the twentieth and twenty-first centuries
- Notable work: Edward Hopper: An Intimate Biography
- Notable awards: Honorary Doctorate from Simmons College
- Website: gaillevin.commons.gc.cuny.edu

Gail Levin is an American art historian, biographer, artist, and a Distinguished Professor of Art History, American Studies, Women's Studies, and Liberal Studies at Baruch College and the Graduate Center of the City University of New York. She is a specialist in the work of Edward Hopper, feminist art, abstract expressionism, Eastern European Jewish influences on modernist art and American modernist art. Levin served as the first curator of the Hopper Collection at the Whitney Museum of American Art.

== Early life and education ==
Levin was born and raised in Atlanta, Georgia and graduated from Northside High School. Levin graduated from Simmons College in 1969 with a B.A. and from Tufts University with an M.A. in fine arts in 1970, and she received her PhD in art history in 1976 from Rutgers University.

== Art career ==
=== Artist ===
Levin is also an artist who has shown photographs, photo collages, and collages with a solo show at the National Association of Women Artists at its New York Gallery in the spring of 2014. The show included her collage memoir, "On NOT Becoming An Artist," which tells her life in art in pictorial form, beginning with her mother teaching her to paint and then her parents forbidding her to become an artist.

Levin has also published books with her photographs, including "Hopper's Places", in which she identified all of the paintings by Edward Hopper and then located the actual sites and photographed them. In her 1985 review of a related show organized by Levin, Vivien Raynor wrote in the New York Times: "Hopper's Places, a show that is as much about its guest curator, Gail Levin, as about its subject....Miss Levin has been building a small reputation as a photographer, and it is partly in this capacity that she now contemplates her subject....Miss Levin's deductions are invariably enlightening, as when she infers that Hopper's tendency to elongate structures was a reflection of his great height." In this book, Levin also analyzes the changes Hopper made in his paintings. Since she began this conceptual art project in the 1970s, several other photographers have emulated her project.

=== Curator ===
At the Whitney Museum of American Art, Levin was the curator of several landmark touring exhibitions, including Edward Hopper: Prints and Illustrations (1979) and Edward Hopper: The Art and The Artist (1980); Synchromism and American Color Abstraction, 1910-1925 (1978); and co-curator with Robert Hobbs of Abstract Expressionism: The Formative Years (1978).

Levin was fired by the Whitney Museum in 1984 for violating her employment contract and writing a book without permission.

Levin continues to organize exhibitions for museums internationally.

== Publications ==
External audio
- Gail Levin talks about Edward Hopper; 1981/10/2, 52:41, Studs Terkel Radio Archive

Levin is the author of "Edward Hopper: A Catalogue Raisonne." She has published books with her photographs, including "Hopper's Places" and "Marsden Hartley in Bavaria." She wrote the foreword to "The Lining of Our Souls: Excursion into Selected Paintings by Edward Hopper" by Rolando Pérez (Cuban poet).

Levin is the author of three biographies: "Edward Hopper: An Intimate Biography," "Becoming Judy Chicago: A Biography of the Artist" and "Lee Krasner A Biography." Levin also spearheaded a recent revival of the artist Theresa Bernstein (1890-2002) by producing and editing "Theresa Bernstein: A Century in Art," a monograph with essays by herself, four of her graduate students, and two other scholars, which accompanies a touring exhibition and a comprehensive research website.

=== Selected works ===
- Lee Krasner: A Biography (2011)
- Ethics and the Visual Arts, co-edited with Elaine A. King (2006)
- Becoming Judy Chicago: A Biography of the Artist (2007)
- Janet Sobel: "Primitivist, Surrealist, and Abstract Expressionist," Woman's Art Journal 26, no. 1 (2005)
- Selected Works by Janet Sobel, the catalog of Janet Sobel's solo exhibition at Gary Snyder Fine Art, essay for Inside Out. 2003.
- Aaron Copland's America, co-authored with Judith Tick (2000)
- Edward Hopper: An Intimate Biography (1995)
- Edward Hopper: A Catalogue Raisonne (1995)
- Theme and Variation: Kandinsky and the American Avant-garde, 1912-1950 (1992)
- Marsden Hartley in Bavaria (1989)
- Twentieth-Century American Painting: The Thyssen-Bornemisza Collection (1988)
- Hopper's Places (1985)
- Edward Hopper (1984)
- Edward Hopper: Gli anni della formazione (1981)
- Edward Hopper: The Art and the Artist (1980)
- Edward Hopper as Illustrator (1979)
- Edward Hopper: The Complete Prints (1979)
- Abstract Expressionism: The Formative Years, co-authored with Robert C. Hobbs (1978)
- Synchromism and American Color Abstraction, 1910-1925 (1978)

== Foundations and interests ==
Levin was the founding president of the Catalogue Raisonne Scholars Association and she serves on the Academic Advisory Council of the Jewish Women's Archive.
