= Mary Leader =

American poet (born 1948)

- Born: January 9, 1948 (age 78); Pawnee, Oklahoma, U.S.
- Education: Oklahoma State University; University of Oklahoma (BA, JD); Warren Wilson College (MFA); Brandeis University (PhD)
- Occupations: Poet; lawyer
- Parent(s): Joe Hauser Privett; Katherine Jo Haddox

Mary Leader (born January 9, 1948) is an American poet and lawyer.

== Life ==
Mary Leader was born on January 9, 1948, in Pawnee, Oklahoma, to Katherine Jo (Haddox) Privett, a poet, and Joe Hauser Privett, a clothing merchant.

== Awards ==
- Emory University Creative Writing Fellowship
- National Poetry Series
- Chad Walsh Poetry Prize
- Iowa Poetry Prize

== Books ==
- Red Signature, Graywolf Press. ISBN 978-1-55597-255-1
- The Penultimate Suitor, University of Iowa Press. ISBN 978-0-87745-748-4
- Beyond the Fire, Shearsman Books. ISBN 978-1-84861-122-1
- She Lives There Still, Shearsman Books. ISBN 978-1-84861-584-7
- The Distaff Side, Shearman Books. ISBN 978-1-84861-806-0

== Education ==
- Attended Oklahoma State University
- Bachelor of Arts, Oklahoma University
- Juris Doctor, Oklahoma University
- Master of Fine Arts, MFA Program for Writers at Warren Wilson College
- Doctor of Philosophy, Brandeis University

== Career ==
- Assistant Oklahoma Attorney General
- Legal Assistant, Oklahoma Court of Appeals
- Referee, Oklahoma Supreme Court
- Visiting Assistant Professor, Louisiana State University
- Associate Professor, University of Memphis
- Full Professor, Purdue University
