= Gustav Deutsch =

Austrian film director (1952–2019)

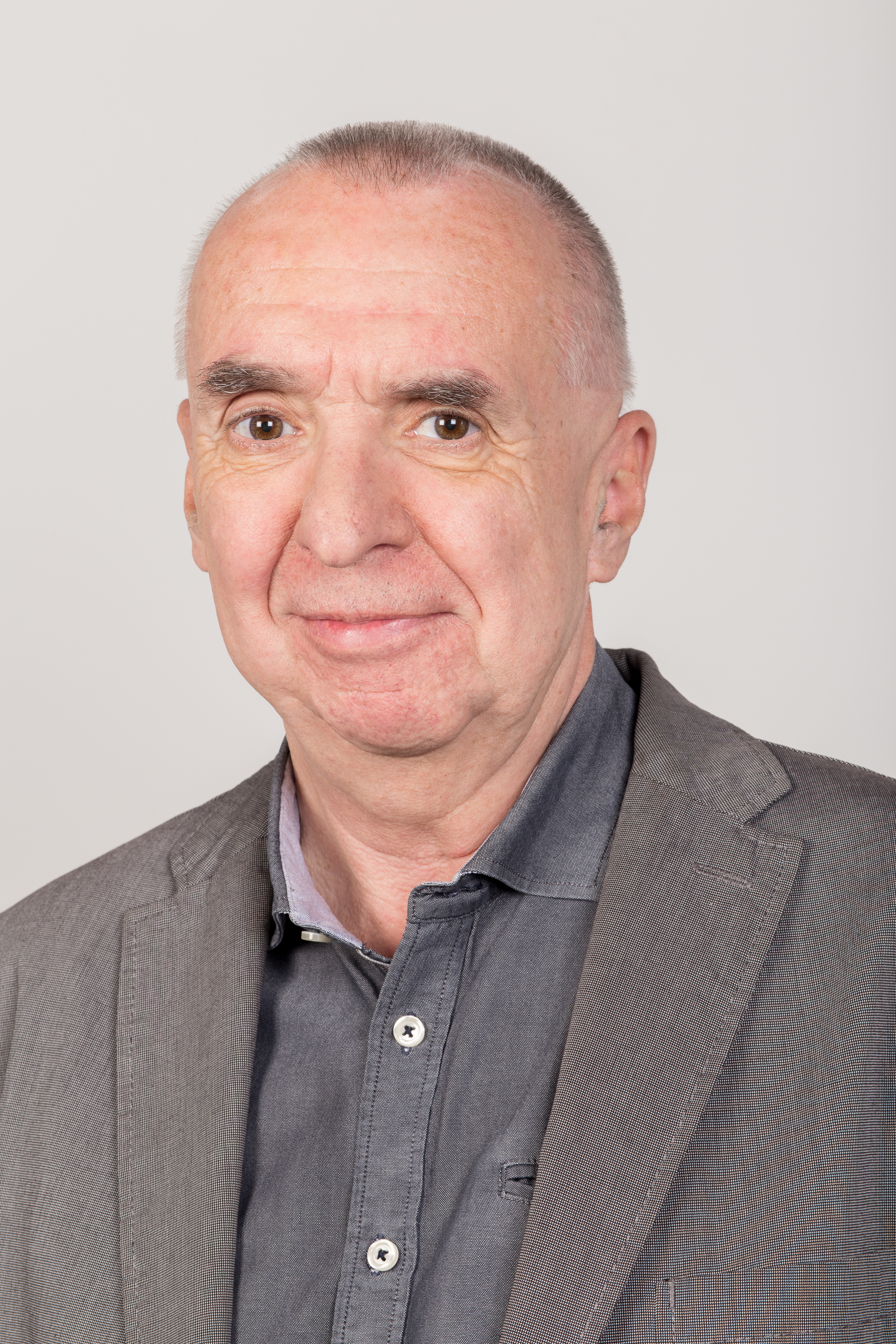
- Born: 19 May 1952; Vienna, Austria
- Died: 2 November 2019 (aged 67); Vienna, Austria
- Occupation: Artist

Gustav Deutsch (19 May 1952 – 2 November 2019) was an Austrian multidisciplinary artist, art director, and film director.

== Biography ==
Deutsch studied architecture at the Vienna University of Technology and carried out several multidisciplinary art projects.

== Filmography ==
- Taschenkino (1995)
- Film ist mehr als Film (1996)
- Film ist. 7-12 (2002)
- Welt Spiegel Kino (2005)
- Film Is... (2009)
- 60 Seconds of Solitude in Year Zero (2011)
- Shirley: Visions of Reality (2013)
