= Elaine Spatz‑Rabinowitz =

American visual artist (born 1942)

Elaine Spatz-Rabinowitz
- Born: 1942 (age 83–84); New York City
- Education: Tufts University
- Known for: Visual art
- Awards: Guggenheim Fellowship (2007)
- Website: https://espatzrabinowitz.com/

Elaine Spatz‑Rabinowitz (born 1942) is an American visual artist known for her hybrid works that merge illusionistic painting, photography, and sculpture. She is professor of Art Emerita at Wellesley College (1988-2008) and taught painting at the School of the Museum of Fine Arts at Tufts University for sixteen years.

Born in New York, she lives, works, and continues to teach privately in Cambridge, Massachusetts. Spatz‑Rabinowitz employs a broad range of media including oil painting, photographic emulsion, Hydrocal plaster, and steel. Her practice blurs the boundaries between painterly illusionism, photographic exactitude, and physical materials. Her work has received awards including a Guggenheim Fellowship in Visual Art and is held in numerous public collections including Museum of Fine Arts, Boston, the Addison Gallery of American Art, and the Worcester Art Museum.

Spatz‑Rabinowitz's recent work focuses on the theme of environmental collapse. Inspired by an expedition to the Arctic in 2013, it explores motifs of connectedness, materiality, the relationship between myth and deception, and our universal implication in systems of production. Integrating themes that have occupied her throughout career—including violence, destruction, inequality, and natural beauty—this work investigates the relationship between the materials that constitute the modern world and the climate catastrophe their production has helped to bring about.

Detail from Arctic Abrasions (c. 2017), from the Arctic Abrasions series.

== Artistic practice ==
Spatz-Rabinowitz has been a practising artist for over fifty years. Throughout the period, her work has sought to collapse the distance between the abstraction of illusionistic imagery and the fragility of the materials used to produce such effects. In doing so, it strives to bring myth into closer contact with the concrete realities of existence.

=== Early work (1972–1990) ===
Spatz‑Rabinowitz graduated from the M.F.A. Tufts University and the School of the Museum of Fine Arts in 1974. During the peak of abstract expressionism, she resisted the demand to eliminate illusionism. Instead she combined figurative imagery with abstract expressionism's insistence on bringing artistic materials to the fore. Her early work encompassed an examination of the domestic interior alongside more public spaces. Dealing with themes of disruption, decay, and death it questioned the boundaries of representation and illusion.

During the early 1980s she began creating mixed-media relief works and developing a serial approach to her art. Examples include Dead Birds, Dead Fish (1988–1989), a series which explores both the connectedness and fragility of nature. Her early works were displayed in numerous exhibitions including the 1974 New Talent at Harcus Krakow Rosen Sonnabend Gallery. Throughout the 1980s Spatz‑Rabinowitz also collaborated extensively with theatre director and McArthur Fellow Peter Sellars. Together they created set designs for international productions including the original performance installation Sudden Difficulties (1983) for the Institute of Contemporary Art, Boston.

=== Landscapes and exteriors (1990-2005) ===
After 1990, Spatz-Rabinowitz's subject matter began to focus increasingly on social and environmental devastation. Series such as Landscapes (1991–2001) and Flowers and Flora (1994–1999) examined this theme in relation to the organic world. Others such as Exteriors (1990–2005) extended the focus to the urban environment, exploring themes of social exclusion and economic inequality. During this period Spatz-Rabinowitz began integrating cast Hydrocal plaster with trompe-l’œil techniques. The fractured and distorted surfaces, combined with realistic imagery, emphasised the theme of devastation, a connection brought out more forcefully in her subsequent "War Work."

=== War work (2004–2013) ===
In the wake of America's invasion of Iraq and Afghanistan, Spatz-Rabinowitz's examination of violence adopted explicitly geo-political subject matter. Surrounded by media images of devastation and suffering, she began to rely increasingly on her use of fragmented and distorted surfaces to evoke the seeming omnipresence of violence. Series such as Bas Reliefs (2010-2012) and Burned Books (2007) demonstrate this tendency. Others, such as War Drawings (2005-2010), directly critique prevailing media narratives by reconfiguring newspaper depictions of violence in the Middle East and beyond. Reviewers compared the work that of Anselm Kiefer. In 2007, it was recognized with a Guggenheim Fellowship.

=== Ecology (2013–present) ===
Like other contemporary artists including Marielle Neudecker and Zaria Forman, an expedition to the Arctic in 2013 provoked a shift in Spatz-Rabinowitz's subject matter. Her new work retains its traditional use of fractured material surfaces to depict the glacial landscapes being destroyed by climate change. The Arctic Abrasions and Vanishings (2018–2022) series draw on the tradition of American landscape painting that includes works such as Frederic Edwin Church’s The Icebergs (1861) and William Bradford’s Scene in the Arctic (ca. 1880). Drawing on her earlier work, Spatz-Rabinowitz executes these works on carefully degraded surfaces to invoke the literal collapse of the environment that she witnessed in the Arctic. The Vanishings series formed the core of her 2017 solo show at Miller Yezerski Gallery in Boston.

Reviews of this work recognized it as a culmination of her career-long integration of realistic imagery with disintegrating surfaces, noting her ability to “to push painting's limits” while bringing artistic practice and environmental collapse into closer dialogue. During this period, Spatz-Rabinowitz also produced an experimental short film, Melting From Beneath (2018) in collaboration with the Irish composer Karen Power, contributing an additional temporal perspective to the Arctic Abrasions series.

=== Awards and recognition ===
In addition to her Guggenheim Fellowship in 2007, Spatz-Rabinowitz has received numerous additional fellowships and awards throughout her career. This includes three Massachusetts Cultural Council Artist Fellowships and a fellowship at the Harvard Radcliffe Institute (then known as the Bunting Institute). Her work has been displayed in museum exhibitions across the United States, including at the Institute of Contemporary Art in Boston, Massachusetts, the Huntsville Museum of Art, Alabama, the Grand Rapids Art Museum, Michigan, the Center for Art, Design and Visual Culture, University of Maryland, and the Dorsky Gallery, New York.

Recently, she has been involved in group shows, including Meltdown at ArtsWestchester in White Plains, New York, alongside Ellen Driscoll and Zaria Forman and The Long View: Women Artists in the Studio, at Suffolk University, celebrating “women artists whose lives have been shaped by years of steadily working.” Reviews of her work and writing about her practice have appeared in publications including ARTnews and Art in America alongside The Pittsburgh Tribune and The Boston Globe.

== Exhibitions ==
=== Solo exhibitions ===
- 2024, Sublime Vestiges, Anderson Yezerski Gallery, Boston, MA
- 2017, Arctic Abrasions, Anderson Yezerski Gallery, Boston, MA
- 2015, Locations Unknown II, Nesto Gallery, Milton Academy, Milton, MA
- 2014, Locations Unknown, Miller Yezerski Gallery, Boston, MA
- 2012, Before Occupy: Paintings by Elaine Spatz-Rabinowitz 2001–2006, Casella Gallery, Wentworth Institute, Boston, MA
- 2010, Blown to Bits, University Gallery, Art Institute of Boston
- 2008, Elaine Spatz-Rabinowitz: Recent Work, Howard Yezerski Gallery, Boston, MA
- 2006, Elaine Spatz-Rabinowitz: Retrospective, Bannister Gallery, Rhode Island College, RI
- 2006, Elaine Spatz-Rabinowitz: Recent Work, O.K. Harris Gallery, New York, NY
- 2005, Elaine Spatz-Rabinowitz: Recent Work, Howard Yezerski Gallery, Boston, MA
- 2004, Elaine Spatz-Rabinowitz: Recent Work, Howard Yezerski Gallery, Boston, MA
- 2003, Elaine Spatz-Rabinowitz: Recent Work, O.K. Harris Gallery, New York, NY
- 1999, Elaine Spatz-Rabinowitz: Recent Work, Howard Yezerski Gallery, Boston, MA
- 1996, Elaine Spatz-Rabinowitz: Recent Work, Howard Yezerski Gallery, Boston, MA
- 1993, Elaine Spatz-Rabinowitz: Recent Work, Contemporary Gallery, inaugural show at the newly opened Davis Museum and Cultural Center, Wellesley College, Wellesley, MA
- 1992, Sculpture and Painted Prints, Bartlett Gallery, Atlantic Union College, South Lancaster, MA
- 1991, Elaine Spatz-Rabinowitz: Recent Work, Howard Yezerski Gallery, Boston, MA
- 1989, Elaine Spatz-Rabinowitz: Recent Work, Howard Yezerski Gallery, Boston, MA
- 1987, Elaine Spatz-Rabinowitz: Paintings and Drawings, New Works New England Gallery, DeCordova Museum and Sculpture Park, Lincoln, MA
- 1987, A.C.A. Galleries, New York, NY

=== Selected group exhibitions ===
- The Long View: Women Artists in the Studio, Suffolk University, Boston, MA (2025)
- Meltdown, ArtsWestchester, White Plains, NY (2025)
- A World Within: Art by Women from the Permanent Collection, Huntsville Museum of Art, Huntsville, AL (2022)
- Lived Space: Humans and Architecture, deCordova Sculpture Park and Museum, Lincoln, MA (2018)
- Occupying Pools, Art on the Marquee, Round 25, Boston Convention and Exhibition Center (2018)
- Arctic Abrasions, Grand Rapids Art Museum, selected for ArtPrize Nine (2017)
- Thinking About Water: Artists Reflect, Overlook Gallery, Metropolitan Waterworks Museum, Chestnut Hill, MA (2017)
