= Opdycke =

Opdycke is a surname. Notable people with the surname include:

- Emerson Opdycke (1830–1884), American businessman and Union Army brigadier general
- Leonard E. Opdycke (1929–2023), American aviation historian and author
- Sandra Opdycke (born 1936), American historian

== See also ==
- Opdyke (disambiguation)
- Updike
