= Climate Museum =

American non-profit organization

The Climate Museum
- Established: July 2015
- Director: Miranda Massie
- Website: www.climatemuseum.org

The Climate Museum is a nonprofit organization in New York City and the first museum dedicated to climate change and climate solutions in the United States. The Climate Museum presents free exhibitions, art installations, youth programs and other public programs at pop-up locations and public spaces in New York City. The museum also hosts a seasonal exhibition on Governors Island and virtual events.

== History ==
The Climate Museum initiative was conceived of in the aftermath of Superstorm Sandy. The founder and director Miranda Massie had worked in law and civil rights, which led her to see climate change through the lens of social activism. In March 2014 the Climate Museum Project was launched, and in July 2015, the museum was granted a five-year charter by the state government of New York. The following February, the museum received 501(c)3 nonprofit status.

The Climate Museum is part of the Museums and Climate Change Working Group, a coalition of museums around the world working to incorporate climate change into their exhibitions and programming.

== Exhibitions and arts initiatives ==
The Climate Museum's first exhibition, In Human Time, was presented at the Sheila C. Johnson Design Center at Parsons School of Design, The New School from December 2017 to February 2018. It explored intersections of polar ice, humanity, and time through the work of artists Zaria Forman and Peggy Weil.

In September 2018, the museum hosted, in partnership with the NYC Mayor's Office on Climate Policy and Programs, a citywide, outdoor public art installation, Climate Signals, by Justin Brice Guariglia. It consisted of 10 solar-powered highway signs installed in New York City parks that were programmed to flash messages about climate in five languages. Related special events were co-presented with community partners.

In Fall 2018 the museum operated its first temporary space on Governors Island at the Admiral's House. Events included the exhibition Climate Changers of New York, a portrait exhibition by David Noles presented in partnership with the NYC Climate Action Alliance, and a digital interactive activity, Create Your Own Climate Signal.

In 2019, the exhibition Taking Action was held on Governors Island. The exhibition addressed clean energy and other mitigation strategies, the obstacles blocking the transition to a carbon-free economy and culture, and suggestions for museum visitors to take collective climate action towards solutions.

In Fall 2021, a one-day sculptural installation and performance piece at Washington Square Park, Low Relief for High Water, was presented by artist Gabriela Salazar. A film on the project was created by Micah Fink Films. Also in Fall 2021 a poster campaign was launched, entitled Beyond Lies dealing with the fossil fuel industry. The posters were designed by illustrator Mona Chalabi and included a QR code with steps for viewers to call their Congressional representatives. It ran through March 2022.

In October 2022, the museum opened its first pop-up space in Soho, Manhattan, remaining open through March 2023. The exhibition included a new work of climate art called Someday, all this by David Opdyke. It also presented social science research and opportunities for visitors to take climate action.

In October 2023, the pop-up exhibition, The End of Fossil Fuel, with a focus on climate justice in relation to the fossil fuel industry, opened on Wooster Street in SoHo and featured a mural by R. Gregory Christie. One of the issues explored in the show are "sacrifice zones" and their impact on racial demographics and climate inequality as an "expression of colonialism".

== Youth programming ==
From March to June 2019, in partnership with the NYC Department of Education's (DOE) Office of Sustainability, a citywide spoken word program called Climate Speakswas held for high school students. The program culminated in a final performance at the Apollo Theater.

In April 2020 the Climate Art for Congress initiative was launched, that included art, writing, and civics project for K-12 students from across the United States. Illustrated notes about climate concerns were created by the students and sent to their congressional representatives.

In the summer of 2021 the Climate Action Leadership Program was initiated. In this program, students (mostly from the New York Metropolitan area) participated in workshops, internships, and volunteer opportunities at the museum and with partner organizations.

== See also ==
- Jockey Club Museum of Climate Change, museum dedicated to climate change, located in Hong Kong.
