= VGE =

VGE may refer to:

- Valéry Giscard d'Estaing (1926–2020), President of France
- Venous gas emboli, in diving
- Virtual geographic environments
- Vodafone Global Enterprise
- Air Service Vosges, ICAO: VGE
