= Opdyke =

Opdyke may refer to:

== Surname ==
- David Opdyke, (born 1969), American visual artist
- Irene Gut Opdyke (1922–2003), Polish nurse, a Righteous Amongst the Nations
- George Opdyke (1805–1880), American entrepreneur, New York City mayor
- Neil D. Opdyke (1933–2019), American professor
- William Opdyke (born 1950s), American scientist

== Places ==
- Opdyke, Illinois
- Opdyke West, Texas

== See also ==
- Opdycke, a surname
- Updike, a surname
