= Guariglia =

Guariglia is an Italian surname. Notable people with the surname include:

- Justin Brice Guariglia (born 1974), American artist and photographer
- Raffaele Guariglia (1889–1970), Italian diplomat
- Tommaso Guariglia (born 1997), Italian basketball player
