= Miranda Massie =

American lawyer and exhibition curator (born 1966)

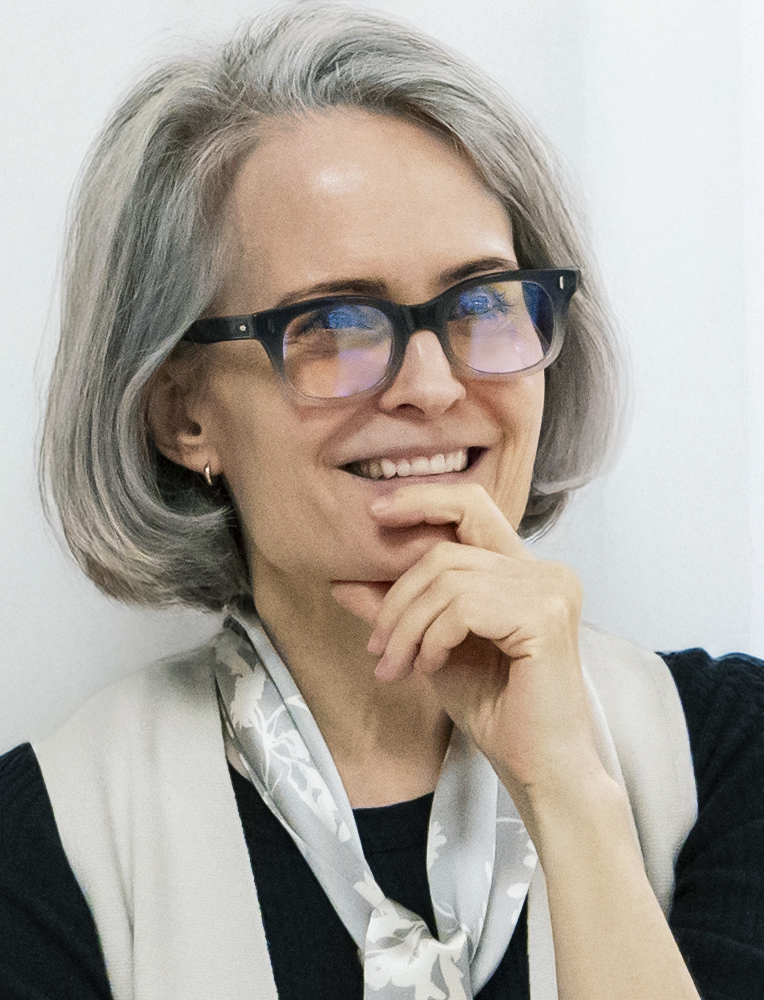
- Born: Miranda Kimball Scott Massie; December 20, 1966 (age 59); New York City
- Education: Cornell University, Yale University, New York University
- Occupation: Director of the Climate Museum
- Website: mirandamassie.com

Miranda Massie is an American lawyer who is the founder and director of the Climate Museum, the first museum in the US dedicated to climate change.

== Early life and education ==
Massie was born in New York City in 1966. She grew up first in Brooklyn Heights, then in New York’s Hudson River Valley. Massie earned a French Baccalaureat and attended Cornell University, where she studied US History and won several honors upon her graduation in 1989. She enrolled in a Ph.D. program in History at the Yale Graduate School of Arts and Sciences, which she left in 1991 with a master's degree. She then lived in Mexico City before pursuing a J.D. degree at New York University School of Law.

== Career ==
Massie moved to Detroit, Michigan to work as a civil rights impact litigator. Her lead counsel roles included the representation of the student intervenors in the University of Michigan Law School affirmative action case, Grutter v. Bollinger, which resulted in a 2003 Supreme Court decision. Massie moved back to New York City in 2007 to serve as a senior attorney in the environmental justice unit at New York Lawyers for the Public Interest (NYLPI), focusing on children's exposure to toxins in public schools. She became Legal Director at NYLPI, overseeing the firm's work in the areas of environmental, health, and disability equity and also served a period as NYLPI's Interim Executive Director.

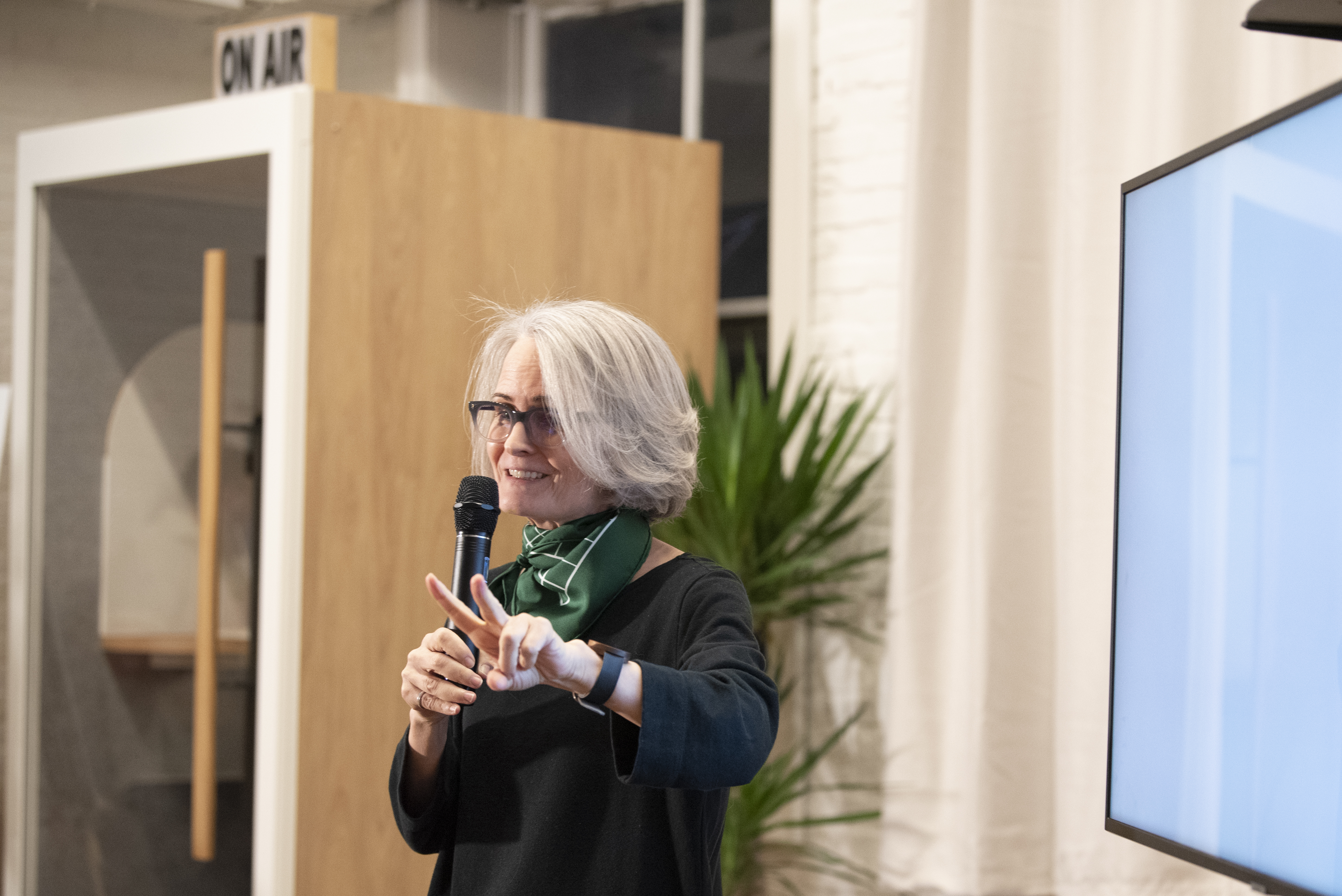
Miranda Massie speaks at a Climate Museum Event

Increasingly concerned about climate change, in 2014, Massie left her career as a lawyer to found the Climate Museum, where she is the director. She has overseen the presentation of its exhibitions and special programs. The Museum has now secured a permanent home that will open in 2029 near Hudson Yards in New York City.

She is a Public Voices Fellow on the Climate Crisis with the OpEd Project and the Yale Program on Climate Communications, and speaks frequently on climate and culture. Massie's civil rights impact advocacy and her cultural work on climate have been featured in a variety of print, radio, and television news outlets.

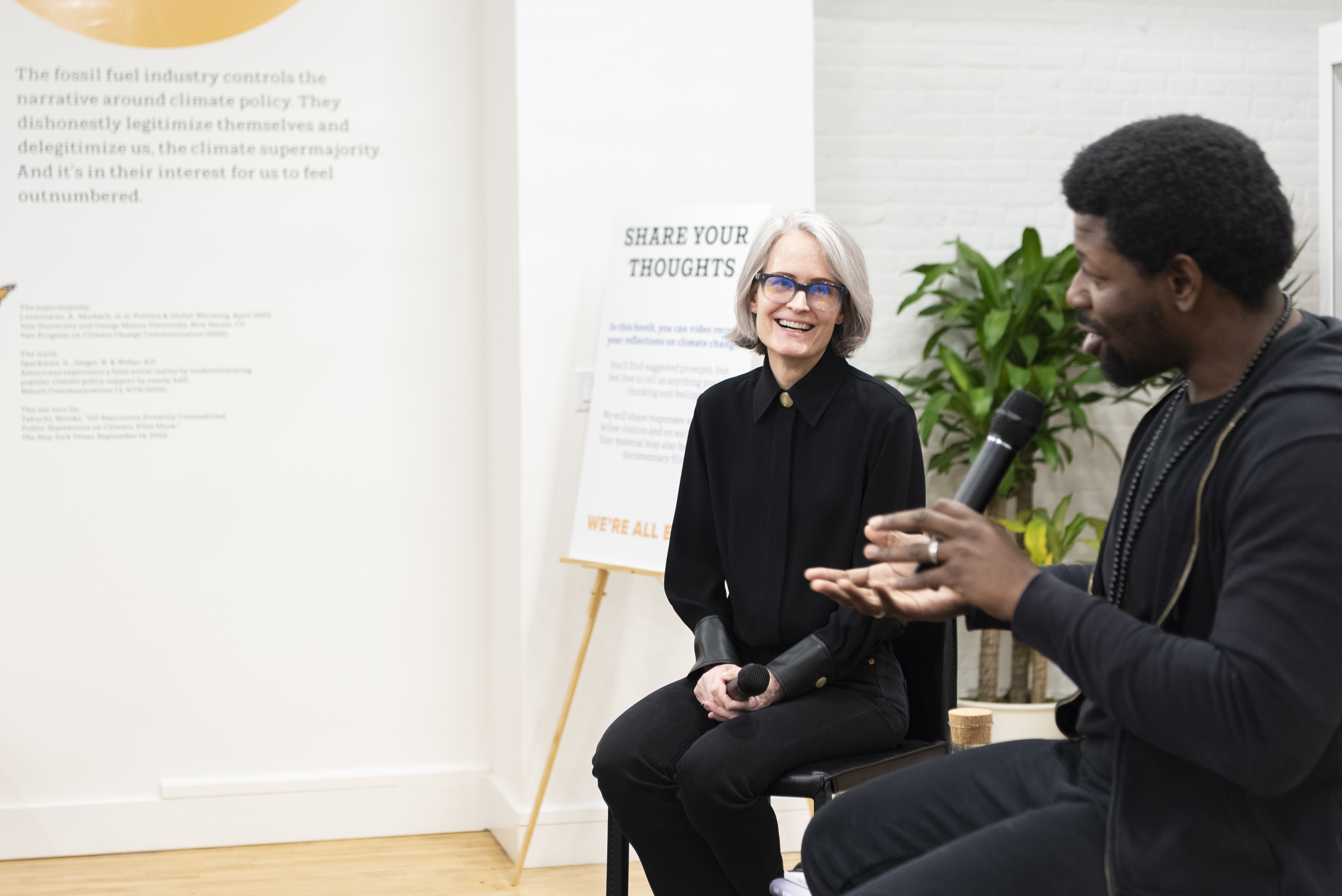
Miranda Massie in conversation with Olúfẹ́mi O. Táíwò at The Climate Museum
