= Peggy Weil =

American artist working in digital media

- Education: Harvard University, Massachusetts Institute of Technology
- Parent: Suzanne Weil

Peggy Weil is an American artist working in digital media.

== Early life and education ==
She graduated from Harvard University in 1976, and received a master's degree from Massachusetts Institute of Technology (MIT) in 1982.

At MIT she was a part of the Architecture Machine Group, from 1980–1982, where she worked under Nicholas Negroponte. Currently she is adjunct faculty at USC School of Cinematic Arts.

== Work ==
In 1990, she produced A Silly Noisy House, an award-winning CD-ROM with multimedia pioneer The Voyager Company. Her multimedia works continued with Ravensburger Interactive, where her Moving Puzzle CD-ROMs won the 1998 Milia D'Or in Cannes. She created MrMind, a web-based bot who asks, "Can you convince me that you are human?" MrMind has been administering The Blurring Test, a Reverse Turing test, since 1998.

In 2007 she co-authored, with Nonny de la Peña, the work Gone Gitmo, a virtual exploration of the Guantanamo Bay prison within Second Life. Along with de la Peña, Weil is widely credited with helping create the genre of immersive journalism. Gone Gitmo was shown in the exhibition, Feedforward, The Angel of History at LABoral (LABoral Centro de Arte y Creación Industrial) in Gijon, Spain, curated by Steve Dietz and Christiane Paul (curator).

In 2011 Weil founded HeadsUP! a global data visualization competition. HeadsUP!2012 used datasets from NASA/JPL's GRACE Satellite (Gravity Recovery and Climate Experiment)and USGS decadal aquifer data to display changes in global groundwater. Richard's Vijgen's winning animation was displayed across 19,000 square feet of digital signboard in Times Square across the Thomson Reuters and NASDAQ signs.

In 2016 Weil, along with Refik Anadol, was commissioned by the City of Los Angeles for the Bloomberg sponsored citywide art biennale, CURRENT:LA Water to create UnderLA, a large scale public projection of the LA Aquifer from The First Street Bridge and Origin of LA River sites.

The Climate Museum's inaugural exhibition in 2018, In Human Time, featured Weil's work, 88 Cores - a 2-mile descent through the Greenland Ice Sheet going back 110,000 years.
