= Mn Artists =

- Website type: Arts writing
- Available in: English
- Founded: 2002
- Headquarters: Minneapolis, MN, US
- Website: https://mnartists.walkerart.org/
- Launched: 2002
- Current status: active

Mn Artists is a platform of the Walker Art Center that supports Minnesota’s local artist community by nurturing arts writing and relationship building. Through Mn Artists and other initiatives, the Walker champions the regional art community by forging connections between locally-rooted artistic practices and national and international conversations in contemporary art, while spotlighting the rigor and vitality of the local arts scene.

In line with the Walker’s mission regarding artists and audiences, Mn Artists focuses on experimentation and interdisciplinary forms of making, with an emphasis on contemporary arts. Relaunched in 2021, mnartists.walkerart.org features essays, reviews, poetry, ethnographic writing, news, and conversations, and maintains a listing of artist opportunities in the state. Mn Artists supports multiple perspectives and constructive criticism within the local arts ecosystem.

== History ==
Jointly conceived in 2001 by the Walker Art Center and the McKnight Foundation, the initiative began as a democratic platform for artists of all disciplines and all career stages to share their work online. Throughout its history, Mn Artists has maintained an independent editorial voice and offered a platform for artists through user-generated content.

- 2001: Launch of mnartists.org, a digital directory of artists, joint project of the Walker Art Center and the McKnight Foundation
- 2000s: Site expands to include collections, news and articles, online forums, events calendar, email newsletter
- Mid-2000s to early 2010s: Program expands to include offline events at the Walker and in partnership with many local organizations
- 2014: Relaunch of redesigned mnartists.org, with improved artist profiles, professional development tools, and regional arts writing program
- 2017: Mn Artists Presents [Your Name Here] and guest editor program launch, bringing a range of artists’ voices to the platform
- 2021: Walker Art Center launches a new site focusing on arts writing and publishing, mnartists.walkerart.org.

== See also ==
- Walker Art Center
