= Rebecca Lee (explorer) =

Hong Kong explorer

- 李樂詩
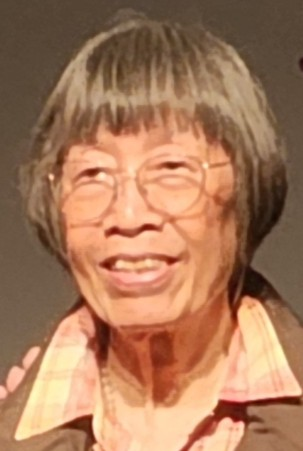
- Lee in 2026
- Born: 1944 (age 81–82); Canton, China
- Citizenship: Chinese
- Education: Hong Kong Polytechnic University
- Occupations: Adventurer; Explorer; Scout leader Author; Photographer; Ads designer Motivational speaker

Rebecca Lee Lok-sze MH (Chinese: 李樂詩, born 1944) is a Hong Kong explorer. She is the first Hongkonger and the first woman to have visited the North Pole, the South Pole, and Mount Everest. Lee has also visited the Yarlung Tsangpo Canyon (the deepest canyon in China) and the Taklamakan desert.

== Life and work ==
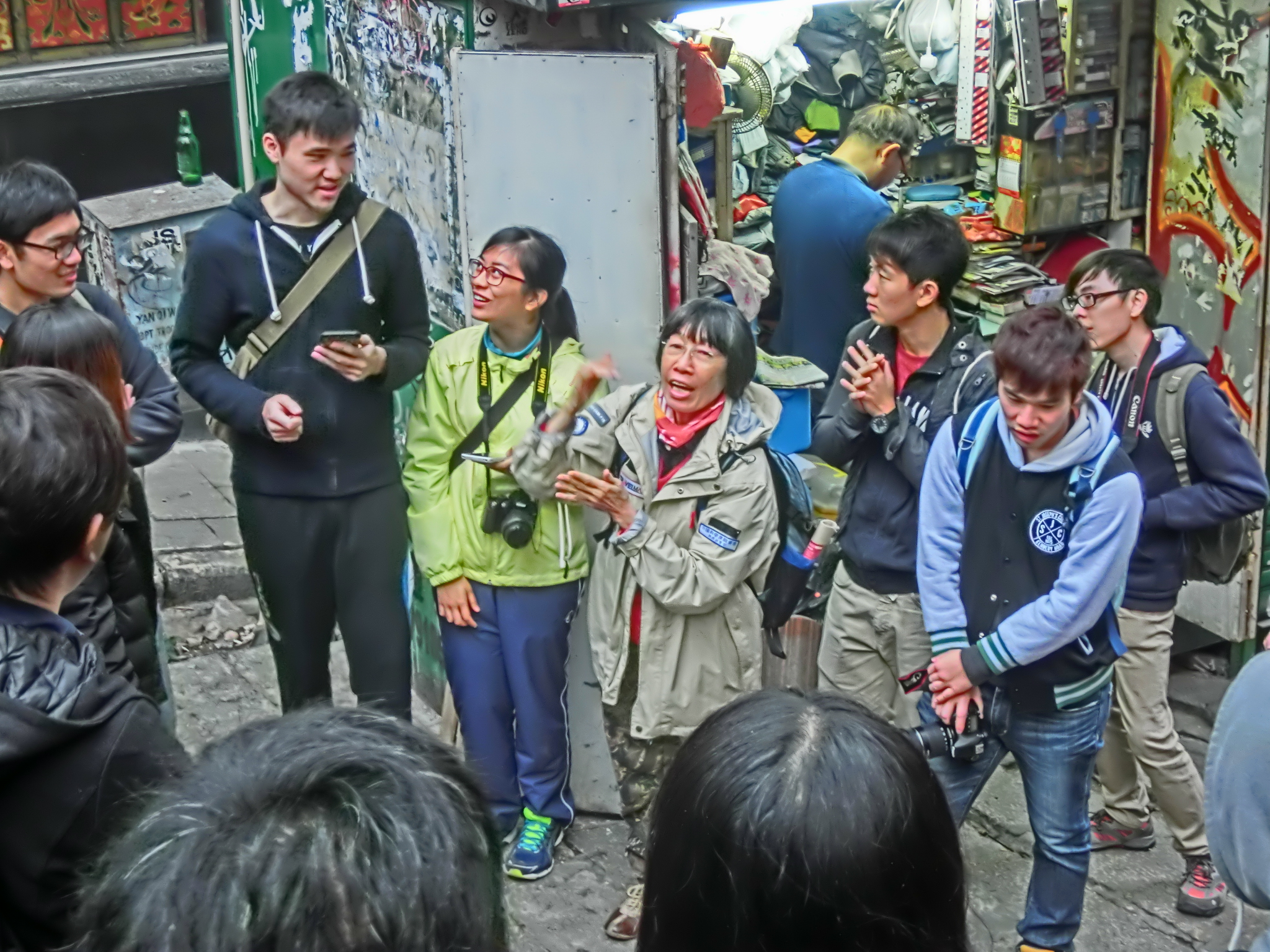
Lee (in grey jacket) talking to students in 2014

Lee has worked as a professional graphic designer, painter, photographer, and writer. In 1985, she joined the Chinese National Antarctic Expedition and first set foot on Antarctica. Over the following 30 years Lee has made significant contributions toward polar exploration and educating people about environmental impacts. In 1997, she founded the Polar Museum Foundation. Lee has donated a collection of artifacts from her polar expeditions to the Museum of Climate Change at The Chinese University of Hong Kong. In 2012, she collaborated with the Hong Kong Philharmonic Orchestra on a performance of the Sinfonia antartica by Ralph Vaughan Williams.

Lee is currently the honorary adviser of the Hong Kong Institute of Vocational Education (Chai Wan), science adviser of the Hong Kong Leisure and Cultural Services Department and vice chairman of the Scout Association of Hong Kong Programme Committee.

== Awards and honours ==
- Doctor of Humanities, honoris causa, by Lingnan University (Hong Kong) in 2000
- Medal of Honour from the Hong Kong government in 2008
- Honorary fellowship of The Hong Kong Polytechnic University in 2009
- Doctor of Humanities, by the Hong Kong Institute of Education in 2012
- Honorary fellowship of The Chinese University of Hong Kong in 2013
