= Suzanne Weil =

American arts administrator

Suzanne Weil (b. 1932) is an American arts administrator and producer who developed Walker Art Center's Performing Arts Department in Minneapolis, was Director of the Dance Program at the National Endowment for the Arts, was Senior Vice-President for Programming at PBS (5) and Executive Director of the Sundance Institute.

== Career ==
From 1969 to 1976, Weil was the Performing Arts Coordinator at the Walker Art Center in Minneapolis, Minnesota. While at the Walker Art Center as coordinator of the Performing Arts Program, Weil commissioned residencies with composers such as John Cage, Philip Glass, and Steve Reich, choreographers Merce Cunningham, Twyla Tharp (Tharp's dance Sue's Leg is dedicated to Weil), Trisha Brown, Yvonne Rainer, and David Gordon, and theater companies Mabou Mines, Meredith Monk, and the Manhattan Project Company. Garrison Keillor has thanked her for being the first to put him on a stage. Weil produced over 200 rock and jazz concerts for the Walker Art Center, often staged at the Guthrie Theater, including Miles Davis, The Who, Led Zeppelin, The Mothers of Invention, the Grateful Dead and Elton John.

From 1976 to 1978, Weill was the Director of Dance Program at the National Endowment for the Arts, Washington.

From 1981 to 1988, Weill was the Senior Vice President of Programming and Public Information at the Public Broadcasting Service. At PBS Weil programmed works including Shoah, Eyes on the Prize, My Dinner With Andre, and The Thin Blue Line. PBS President Bruce L. Christensen described Weil's contributions to PBS and public television as "legion and extraordinary...her particular genius has been her ability to recognize and nurture creativity. Her unfailing eye for quality, and talent for bringing great minds together, have resulted in many of television's finest moments over the last ten years, from the presentation of Shoah to Baryshnikov by Tharp."

From 1989 to 1991, Weil worked as the Executive Director of The Sundance Institute.

As an independent producer, Weil served as an associate of the 2006 documentary Sketches of Frank Gehry. She also served on the Board of Directors of Baryshnikov Arts Center where she helped establish the Cage Cunningham Fund

== Personal life ==
Weil's husband is Fred Weil Jr. Her daughter is American artist, Peggy Weil.
