= Walker Art Center =

Gallery in Minneapolis, Minnesota, U.S.

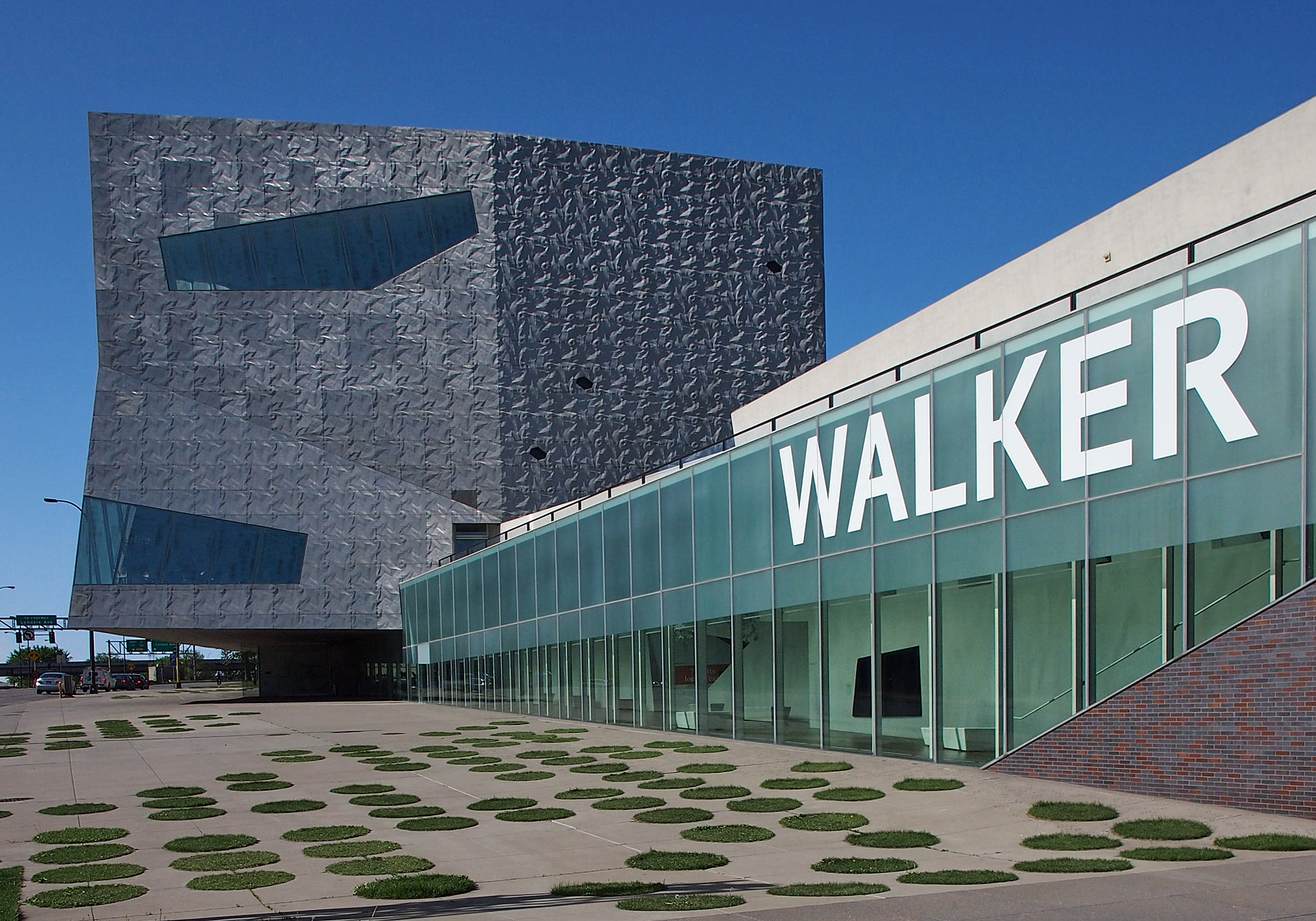
- Herzog & de Meuron's addition
- Established: 1927
- Location: 725 Vineland Place, Minneapolis, Minnesota, United States
- Coordinates: 44°58′05″N 93°17′19″W
- Type: Art center
- Director: Mary Ceruti
- Website: walkerart.org

The Walker Art Center is a multidisciplinary contemporary art center in the Lowry Hill neighborhood of Minneapolis, Minnesota, United States. The Walker is one of the most-visited modern and contemporary art museums in the U.S.: together with the adjacent Minneapolis Sculpture Garden and Cowles Conservatory, it has an annual attendance of around 700,000 visitors. The museum's permanent collection includes over 13,000 modern and contemporary art pieces, including books, costumes, drawings, media works, paintings, photography, prints, and sculpture.

The Walker Art Center began in 1879 as an art gallery in the home of lumber baron Thomas Barlow Walker. Walker formally established his collection as the Walker Art Gallery in 1927. With the support of the Federal Art Project of the Works Progress Administration, the Walker Art Gallery became the Walker Art Center in January 1940. The Walker celebrated its 75th anniversary as a public art center in 2015.

The Walker's new building, designed by Edward Larrabee Barnes and opened in 1971, saw a major expansion in 2005. Swiss architects Herzog & de Meuron's addition included an additional gallery space, a theater, restaurant, shop, and a special events space.

== Programs ==
=== Visual arts ===
The visual arts program has been a part of the Walker Art Center since its founding. The program includes an ongoing cycle of exhibitions in the galleries as well as a permanent collection of acquired, donated, and commissioned works. Since the 1960s, the Visual Arts program has commissioned works from artists to exhibit and held residencies for artists including Robert Irwin, Glenn Ligon, Barry McGee, Catherine Opie, Lorna Simpson, Nari Ward, and Nairy Baghramian.

The Walker's collection represents works of modern and contemporary art, especially focused after 1960. Its holdings include more than 13,000 pieces, including books, costumes, drawings, media works, paintings, photography, prints, and sculpture. In 2015, the Walker celebrated the 75th anniversary of its founding as a public art center with a yearlong exhibition Art at the Center: 75 Years of Walker Collections. Some collection highlights include:

- Chuck Close, Big Self-Portrait
- Franz Marc, Die grossen blauen Pferde (The Large Blue Horses)
- Edward Hopper, Office at Night
- Yves Klein, Suaire de Mondo Cane (Mondo Cane Shroud)
- Goshka Macuga, Lost Forty
- Andy Warhol, 16 Jackies

=== Performing arts ===
Live performance art is a major part of the Walker's programming and it is seen as a leader in exhibiting the medium. In 1940, the Walker began presenting local dance, poetry, and concerts, largely organized by volunteers. By 1963, this group had become Center Opera, the Walker's performing arts program focused on exhibiting new works emphasizing visual design. In 1970, Center Opera disbanded from the Walker and became the Minnesota Opera. The same year, Performing Arts was officially designated as a department of the Walker Art Center.

Since the 1960s, Performing Arts at the Walker has commissioned 265 performance works. Notable coordinators of the performing arts programs include John Ludwig, Suzanne Weil, Nigel Redden, and Robert Stearns. In addition, the department programs a 25-show season every year that includes performance art, theater, dance, spoken word, and music. It is one of the nation's largest performing arts programs of its kind found in a museum. A number of artists have long histories working with and performing at the Walker, most notably choreographers Bill T. Jones, Meredith Monk, and Merce Cunningham, for whom the Walker staged the retrospective Life Performs Art in 1998. As a longtime associate of the Merce Cunningham Dance Company, the Walker was able to acquire 150 art objects central to the company's history from the Cunningham Foundation in 2011. The agreement included sculptures, sets, costumes and other works by artists like Robert Rauschenberg and Jasper Johns.

=== Moving image ===
The Walker's film and video programs feature both contemporary and historical works. In the 1940s, the Walker identified moving images (mostly movies, but also experimental films) as integral to contemporary life. Artists of that time were experimenting with film's formal properties, such as light, motion, and sound, while also separating film art from conventional narrative cinema.

In 1973, the Film/Video Department was officially formed and the Edmond R. Ruben Film and Video Study Collection was established, along with an endowment to fund the development of the archive. Ruben, a leading figure in film exhibition in the Upper Midwest, and his wife, Evelyn, believed in collecting films as a way of preserving the art form. Today, with more than 850 titles, the Ruben Collection brings together classic and contemporary cinema as well as documentaries, avant-garde films, and video works by artists. It holds works by visual artists ranging from Salvador Dalí, Marcel Duchamp, and Fernand Léger to extensive contemporary work by William Klein, Derek Jarman, Bruce Conner, Marcel Broodthaers, Matthew Barney, Nam June Paik, Wolf Vostell, and experimental artists such as Paul Sharits and Stan Brakhage.

=== Design ===
The Walker maintains a professional, in-house design and editorial department to fulfill its various communication needs. The department is responsible for the design and editing of all printed materials, including the creation and planning of publications such as exhibition catalogues, bimonthly magazines, and books, as well as exhibition and event graphics, signage programs, and promotional campaigns.

The department also organizes design-related projects and programs, such as lectures, exhibitions, and special commissions. Over the course of its 60-plus-year history, the department has organized many important exhibitions on architecture and design and has served as a forum for contemporary design issues, bringing hundreds of architects, designers, and critics to the Twin Cities through programs such as the Insights design lecture series, which celebrated its 30th year in 2016. During the 1940s, the Walker built two "idea houses" exhibiting the latest in building materials, furnishings and architectural design trends.

From the late 1960s until the early '90s, the museum's design curator, Mildred Friedman, helped conceive and stage exhibitions on, among other topics, the Dutch avant-garde movement De Stijl, the design process at the Modernist furniture company Herman Miller, the history of graphic design, and traditional and contemporary Japanese arts, crafts and culture. For more than 30 years, the Walker has also offered the Mildred S. Friedman Design Fellowship, a yearlong program for young designers.

=== Digital media ===
The Walker's New Media Initiatives group (renamed Digital Media in 2017) oversees mnartists.org, an online database of Minnesota artists and organizations that provides a digital gathering place for the local arts community. Through a partnership with the Minneapolis Institute of Art, the Walker manages ArtsConnectEd, an online resource for arts educators that draws from both institutions' permanent collection resources.

In 1998, the Walker acquired äda'web, an early net art website curated by Benjamin Weil and designed by Vivian Selbo. The first official project of äda'web went up in May 1995, although it had been informally active since February of the same year.

In 2011, the Walker website was relaunched as a news-style website, featuring essays, interviews, and videos by both Walker staff and guest writers, as well as curated news links about global art and culture. The relaunch was met with positive reviews around the art world.

=== Education and public programs ===
Learning is emphasized as a core experience at the Walker through a mix of education programs, community building efforts, and interpretive projects. The department conducts community, family, interpretive, public, school, teen, and tour programs, as well as mnartists.org. Each division offers programs and activities in visual art, performing arts, film/video, new media, design, and architecture. To inform these undertakings, the staff work with Walker curators and partners from local organizations, artists, schools, and community groups. Advisory groups such as the Walker Art Center Teen Arts Council, Tour Guide Council, and the Parent Advisory Group are also implemented in the department for the Walker to further build relationships with its audience.

=== Publishing ===
The Walker's long history of publishing includes the production of exhibition catalogues, books, and periodicals as well as digital publishing. From 1946 to 1954, it published the Everyday Art Quarterly; in 1954, the publication changed its name to Design Quarterly and "shifted its emphasis away from consuming design to understanding design's impact on society and its processes and methods of practice and inquiry." It was discontinued in 1993. The Walker's in-house design studio has created countless exhibition catalogues dedicated to the art of Marcel Broodthaers, Trisha Brown, Huang Yong Ping, Kiki Smith, Kara Walker, Andy Warhol, and Krzysztof Wodiczko, among many others, as well as books on design, architecture, social practice, and other topics in contemporary art. In 2011, the Walker redesigned its homepage as an "idea hub," a news-magazine format that presents original interviews, videos, commissioned essays, scholarly writings, and newslinks. The publishing-forward homepage was hailed as a "game-changer, the website that every art museum will have to consider from this point forward" (Tyler Green, Modern Art Notes) and "a model for other institutions of all kinds" (Alexis Madrigal, The Atlantic). The site won Best of the Web awards at the 2012 Museums and the Web conference, including "Best Overall Site" and "Best Innovative/Experimental Site." It also won a gold MUSE Award for "Online Presence, Media & Technology" from the American Alliance of Museums. In 2017, the homepage was redesigned, and the Walker's digital publishing was rebranded under the title Walker Reader, a magazine landing page that aggregates original content from the Walker's five verticals.

In April 2020, The New York Times said the Walker website was one of the best museum sites during the COVID pandemic, stating the "Walker Reader" was "an editorial arm of the museum that features debates on Indigenous art, or on how museums respond to the #MeToo movement. Treating the digital museum as coequal to the physical museum means you can be nimble when disaster strikes.” In August 2020, the Walker Reader ceased publication.

== Campus ==
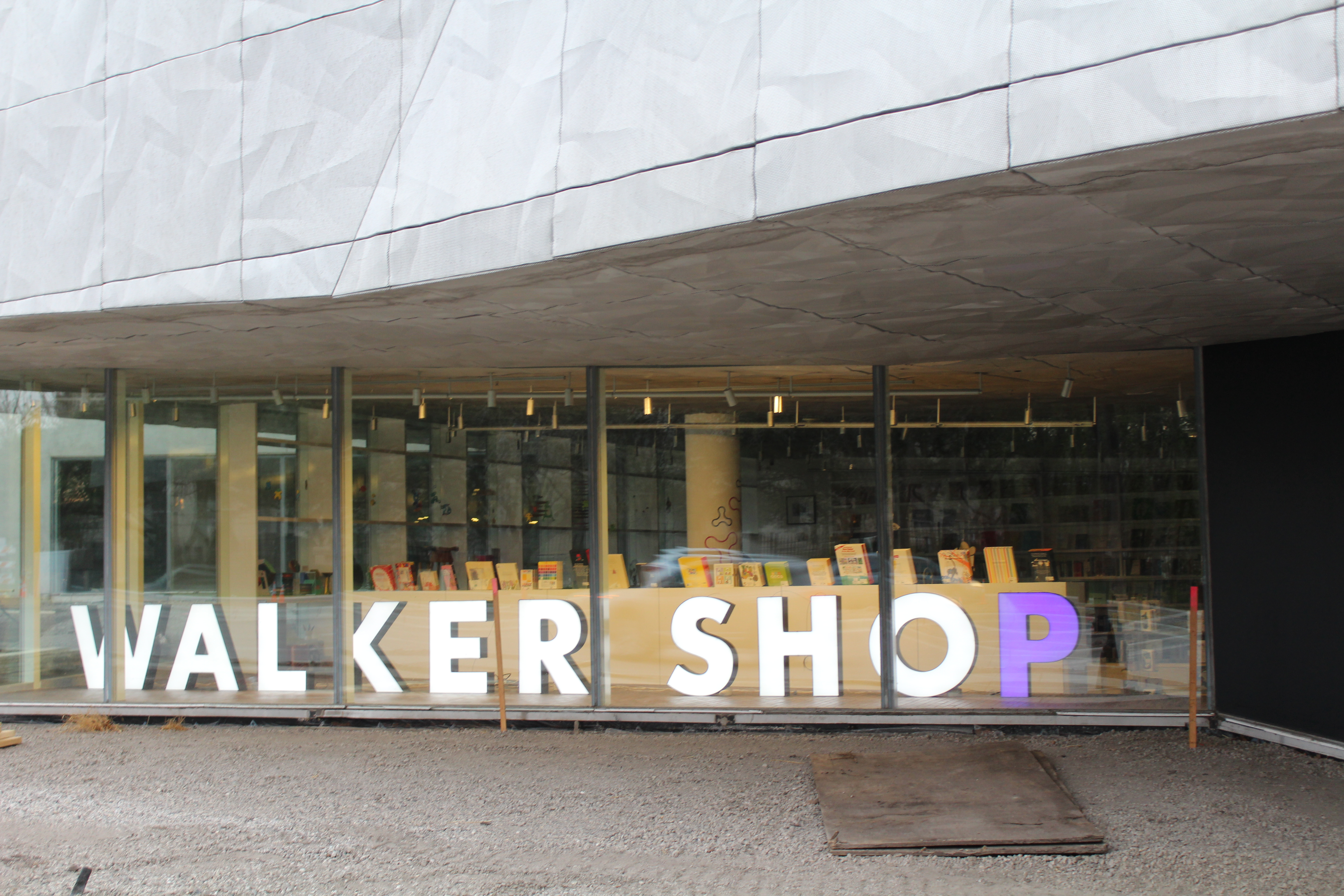
Walker Shop memoriam for Prince on the first anniversary of his death

Located on a 17-acre urban campus, the Walker Art Center's 260,000 square foot, 8-story building encompasses 10 art galleries along with a cinema, theater, shop, restaurant, and café, along with other special events spaces and lecture rooms. In April 2026, the Walker Art Center ended their partnership with the restaurant, Cardamom, after the latter attempted to layoff workers in favor of online ordering.

The original building was designed by New York-based architect Edward Larrabee Barnes and opened in May 1971. Barnes designed the building in the minimalist style of the period with a plain, modular brick exterior and expansive white spaces in the interior. The structure is a unique arrangement of galleries that spiral up around a central staircase and open onto rooftop terraces. The Walker's architecture gained critical acclaim upon its opening and Barnes received the American Institute of Architects Award for his work.

In 2005, Barnes's original building underwent a $67 million expansion designed by Swiss architects Jacques Herzog and Pierre de Meuron. The addition was built on a "town square" concept meant to open up Barnes's boxlike building through accessible gathering spaces. Its central element is an abstract geometric tower made of aluminum mesh panels, built for Herzog & de Meuron by the Minnesota firm Spantek, and glass windows that holds the theater, restaurant, and shop spaces. Windowed halls containing expanded gallery and atrium spaces connect the tower to the original structure.

In 2015, the Walker announced a plan to unify the Walker and the surrounding Minneapolis Sculpture Garden. Key features of the renovation include a new entry pavilion for the Walker, a new hillside green space, the Upper Garden, and the reconstruction of the 26-year-old sculpture garden, a partnership with the Minneapolis Park and Recreation Board. The project also implements green-roof technology, rainwater reclamation systems in the garden, and the addition of hundreds of new trees throughout the campus. The renovation was completed in November 2016, with the sculpture garden reopening to the public in spring 2017.

== History ==
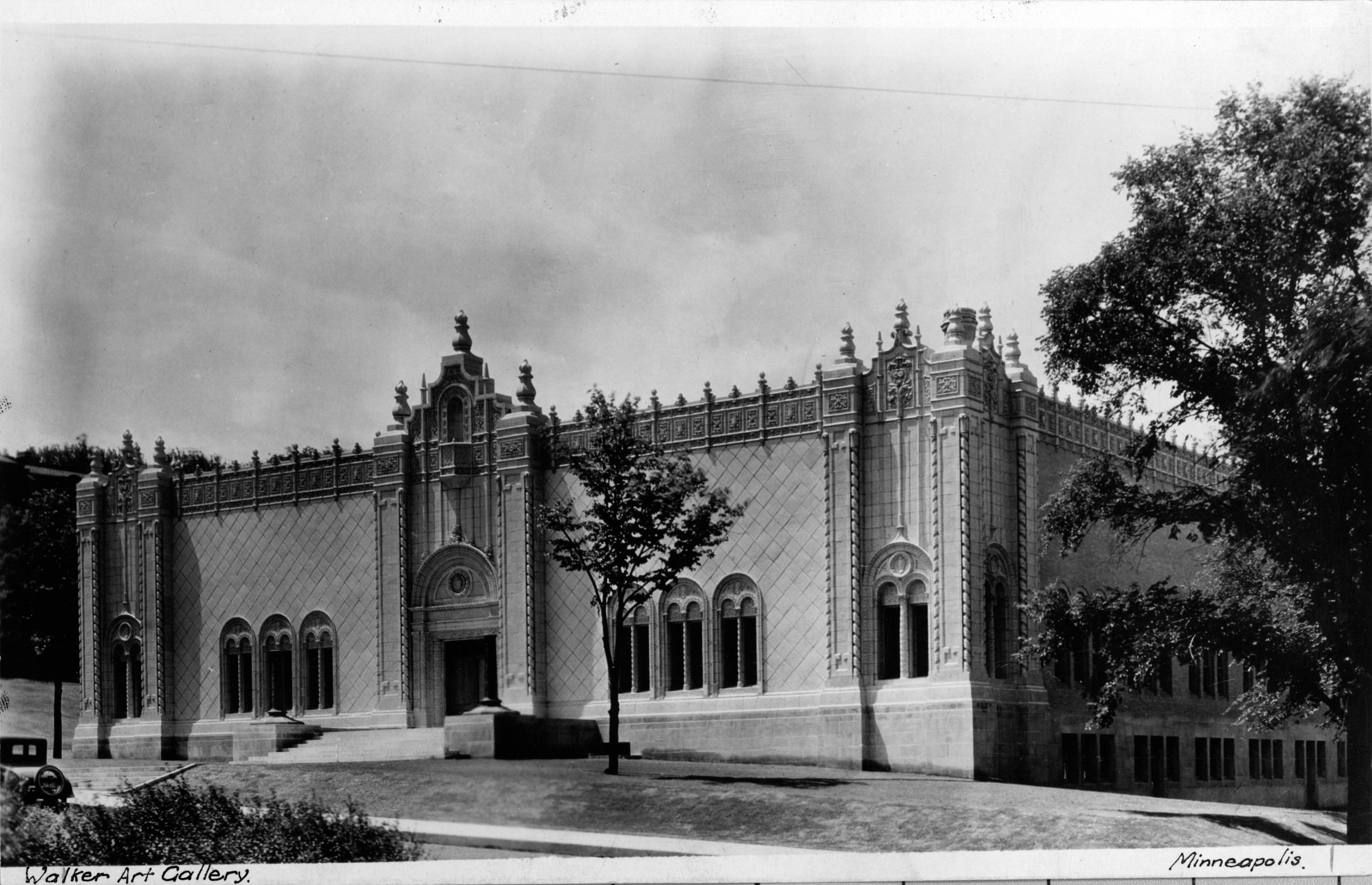
Walker Art Galleries in 1927.

The Walker Art Center began with Minneapolis businessman Thomas Barlow Walker, who held one of the largest art collections in the nation. In 1879, he dedicated part of his home to exhibiting the art to the public for free. In 1916, Walker purchased the land now known as Lowry Hill to build a museum for his growing collection. His museum, the Walker Art Galleries, was opened on May 21, 1927.

In 1939, the Minnesota Arts Council was granted control of the building on Lowry Hill, along with its art collection, in order to create a civic art center. With the assistance of the Works Progress Administration, building improvements were made and the Walker Art Center opened in January 1940. Daniel Defenbacher, who led the Federal Art Project's Community Art Center program, left the WPA to become the first director of the Walker Art Center. Around this time, the Walker officially began its focus on modern and contemporary works of art.

The Walker's current building, designed by Edward Larrabee Barnes, opened in 1971 and expanded in 1984. Minneapolis Parks and Recreation partnered with the Walker Art Center to establish the Minneapolis Sculpture Garden on the Walker's campus in 1988.

In 1984, the Walker Art Center hosted a residency for Keith Haring, during which he created many notable works and murals.

Opened in April 2005, the most recent building expansion nearly doubled the size of the Walker Art Center. The expansion, designed by Herzog & de Meuron, included an additional gallery space, a theater, restaurant, shop, and special events space.

In June 2017, the reopening of the sculpture garden after reconstruction was delayed due to protests over Sam Durant's sculpture Scaffold.

=== Timeline ===
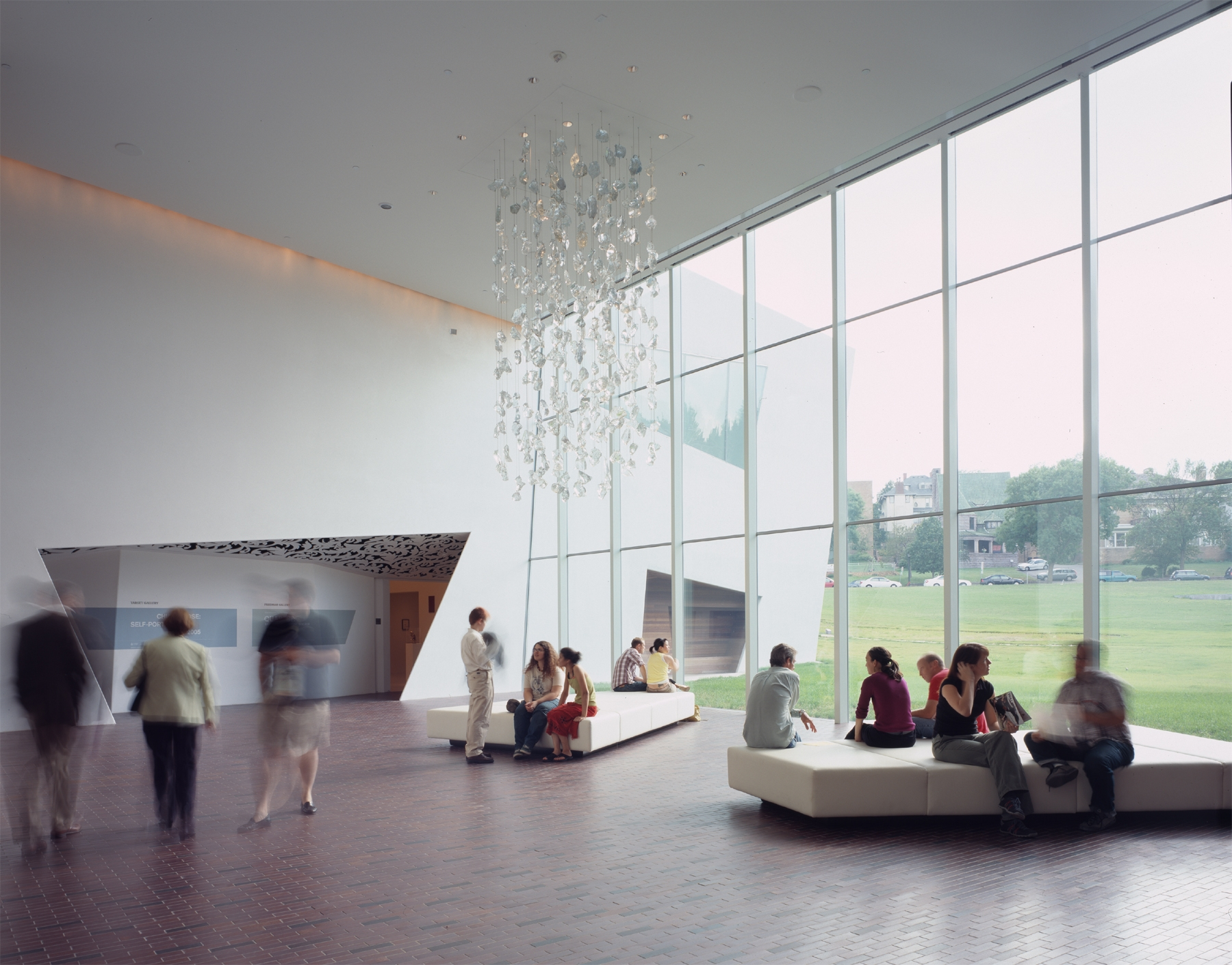
Cargill Lounge

- 1879 – Lumber baron Thomas Barlow (T.B.) Walker opens the first public art gallery west of the Mississippi at his residence on Hennepin Avenue in Downtown Minneapolis
- 1927 – Walker Art Galleries opens in Minneapolis, on the current Walker Art Center site.
- 1940 – Funded by 1939 Works Projects Administration (WPA) grants, Walker Art Galleries becomes the Walker Art Center. Under its first director, Daniel Defenbacher, it began to add modern and regional art to the eclectic collection gathered by T. B. Walker. It opens to the public with exhibitions Ways to Art, Parallels in Art, and Trends in Contemporary Art, signaling its new interest in Modern Art. Defenbacher and his wife Louise Walker Defenbacher collaborated on Design Quarterly, which showcased good modern design in housewares and furniture. Spring Dance Festival, organized by Gertrude Lippincott, is the first performance event at the Walker.
- 1942 – Franz Marc, Die grossen blauen Pferde (The Large Blue Horses) (1911) is the Walker's first acquisition of Modern Art.
- 1946 – Everyday Art Gallery, curated by Hilde Reiss, opens as the first exhibition space dedicated for design in a U.S. museum. Everyday Art Quarterly (later renamed Design Quarterly) begins publication as the first U.S. museum journal on design.
- 1948 – Edward Hopper, Office at Night (1940) acquired.
- 1950 – Walker art school closed. Defenbacher replaced as Director by H. Harvard Arnason.
- 1954 – Georgia O'Keeffe, Lake George Barns (1926) is acquired.
- 1963 – Walker Art Center establishes the Center Opera Company, which later becomes the Minnesota Opera. Guthrie Theater opens adjacent to the Walker. John Cage, with the Merce Cunningham Dance Company, presents first Walker performance.
- 1964 – Dominick Argento's Masque of Angels performed by the Center Opera Company as first Performing Arts commission.
- 1967 – Andy Warhol 16 Jackies (1964) acquired.
- 1969 – Major acquisitions include Chuck Close, Big Self-Portrait (1967–1968)
- 1970 – Performing Arts Department is formed.
- 1971 – New Walker Art Center opens, designed by Edward Larrabee Barnes.
- 1972 – Film/Video Department is established.
- 1976 – The Walker becomes a public institution; T.B. Walker Foundation establishes museum endowment.
- 1978 – Laurie Anderson performs as part of the Perspectives series, copresented with the Saint Paul Chamber Orchestra. Summer Music & Movies in Loring Park begins.
- 1988 – Minneapolis Sculpture Garden opens, designed by Edward Larrabee Barnes. Commissioned works include Claes Oldenburg and Coosje van Bruggen's Spoonbridge and Cherry (1985–1988)
- 1989 – Out There series of experimental performance art and theater begins.
- 1990 – Regis Dialogues, a series of film retrospectives and interviews with noted filmmakers and actors, begins with Clint Eastwood and James Ivory.
- 1992 – Minneapolis Sculpture Garden expansion opens.
- 1996 – New Media Initiatives Department is formed with Gallery 9, a web site for net art, launches with Piotr Szyhalski, Ding an sich (The Canon Series) (1997), the first new-media commission.
- 1998 – Charles Ray, Unpainted Sculpture (1997) acquired. Art Performs Life: Merce Cunningham/Meredith Monk/Bill T. Jones, a multidisciplinary exhibition, celebrates the Walker's long-term relationships with the artists. ArtsConnectEd, a web site featuring the collections of the Walker and the Minneapolis Institute of Art, launches.
- 2002 – mnartists.org, a joint project of the Walker and the McKnight Foundation, launches.
- 2005 – Newly expanded Walker Art Center, designed by Herzog & de Meuron, opens in April.
- 2012 – Walker Art Center holds the first Internet Cat Video Festival
- 2015 – The Walker breaks ground on its renovation of the Minneapolis Sculpture Garden
- 2024 – A group of union workers at the gallery take to social media to protest the art gallery's no-sitting policy.
- 2026 – In response to the gallery's no-sitting policy, state legislators introduced right to sit legislation in the Minnesota Legislature.

== Management ==
=== Funding ===
The Walker Art Center is supported in part by a grant provided by the Minnesota State Arts Board through an appropriation by the Minnesota Legislature from the State's general fund and its arts and cultural heritage fund. To ensure the Walker's creative independence, then-director Kathy Halbreich forswore millions of dollars in potential state aid for the museum's $73.8 million expansion in 2005, a decision that resulted in a one-year salary freeze, some staff cuts, and the elimination of the Walker's new-media art program.

In 2011, the Walker Art Center reported net assets of $243 million. Its annual expenses were $22 million, and its endowment was at $152 million. The museum director's compensation is at around $375,000.

=== Audience engagement ===
As of 2011, total attendance was at about 590,000 visitors, out of which 22% were Teen and Youth Visitors.

=== Directors ===
- Daniel Defenbacher, 1940–1951
- Harvey Arneson, 1951–1961
- Martin Friedman, 1961–1990
- Kathy Halbreich, 1991–2007
- Olga Viso, 2007–2017
- Mary Ceruti, 2019–present

== Gallery of selected artworks ==
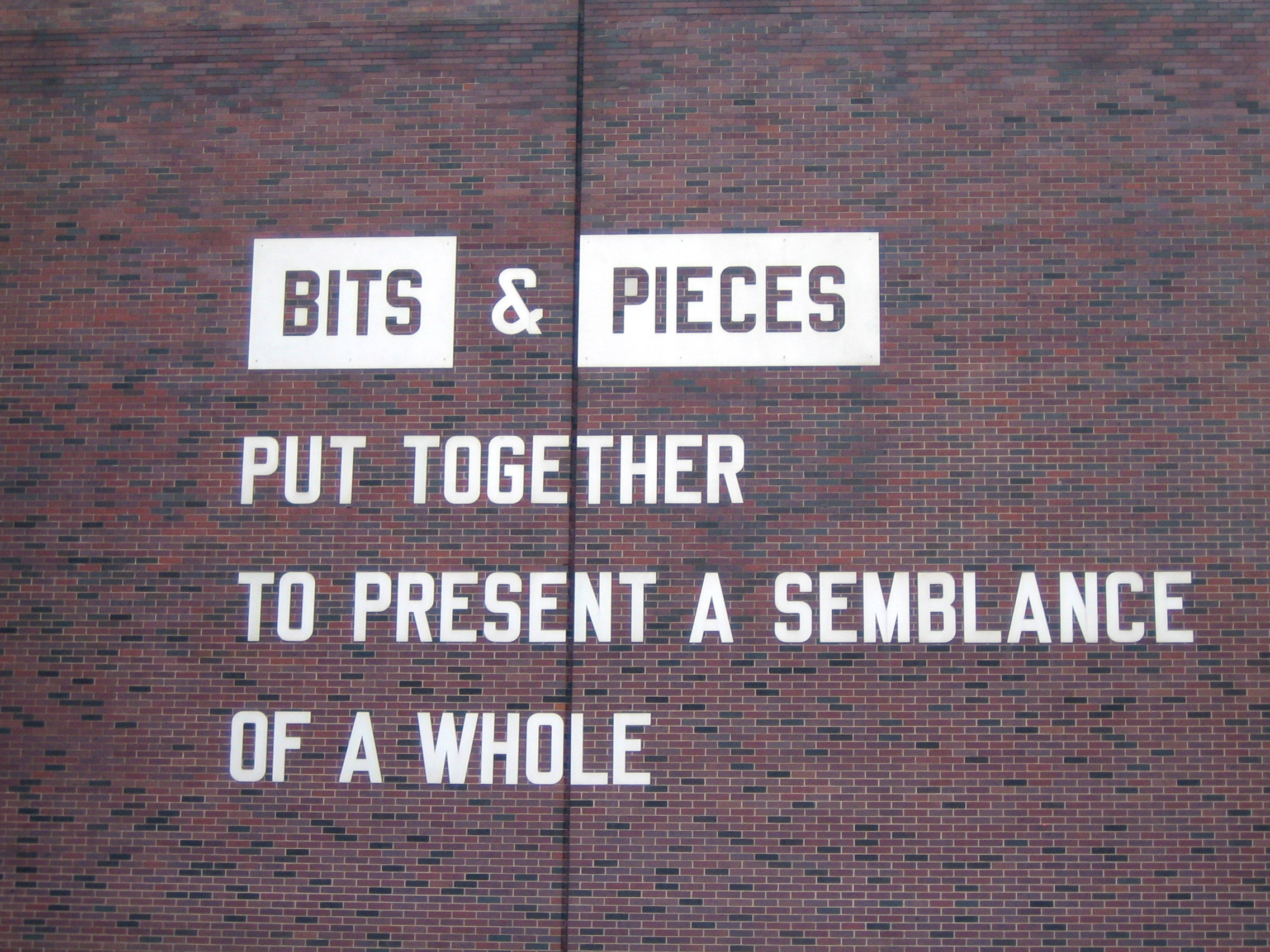
Lawrence Weiner, Bits & Pieces Put Together to Present a Semblance of a Whole

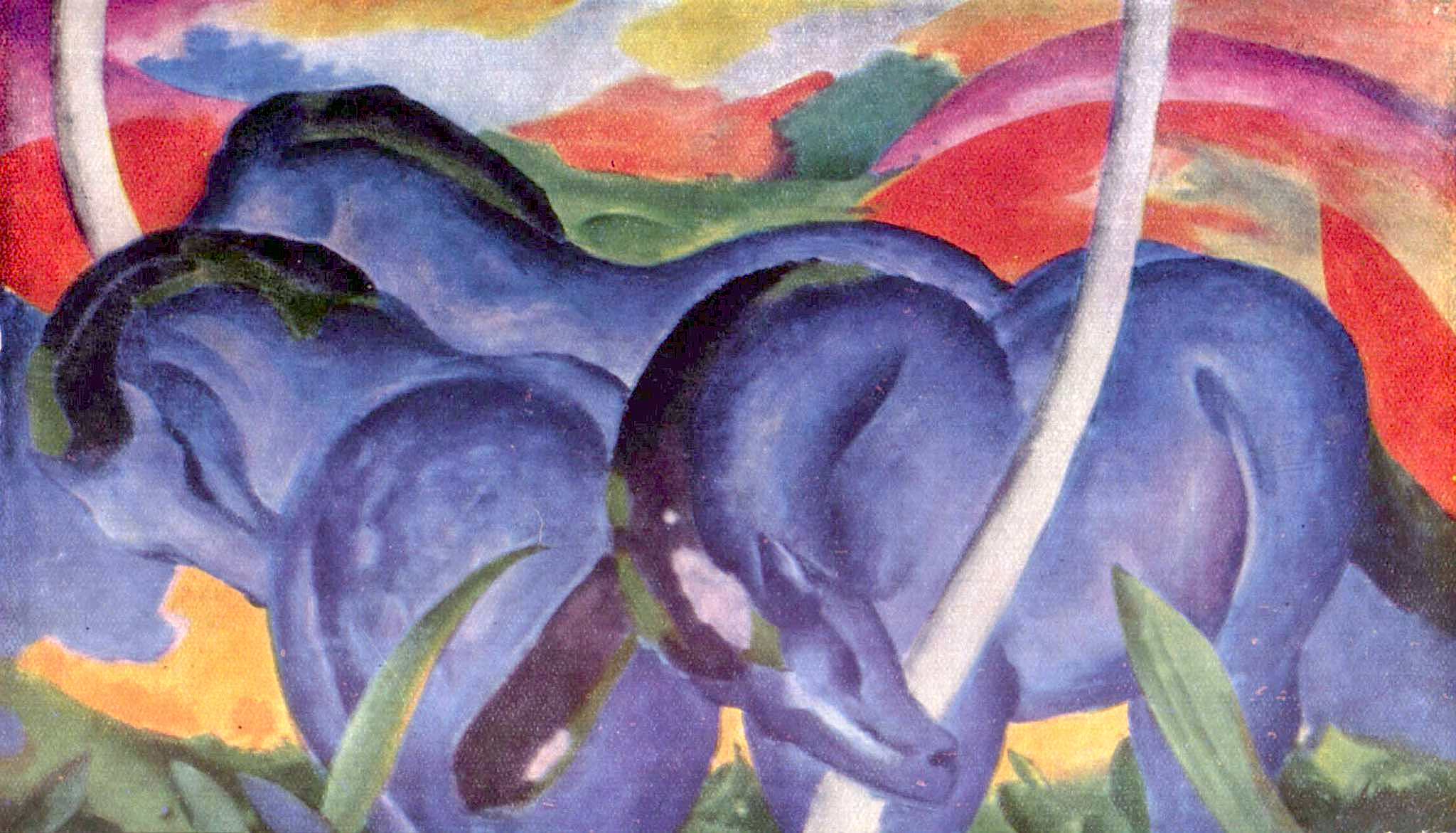
Franz Marc, The Large Blue Horses (1911)

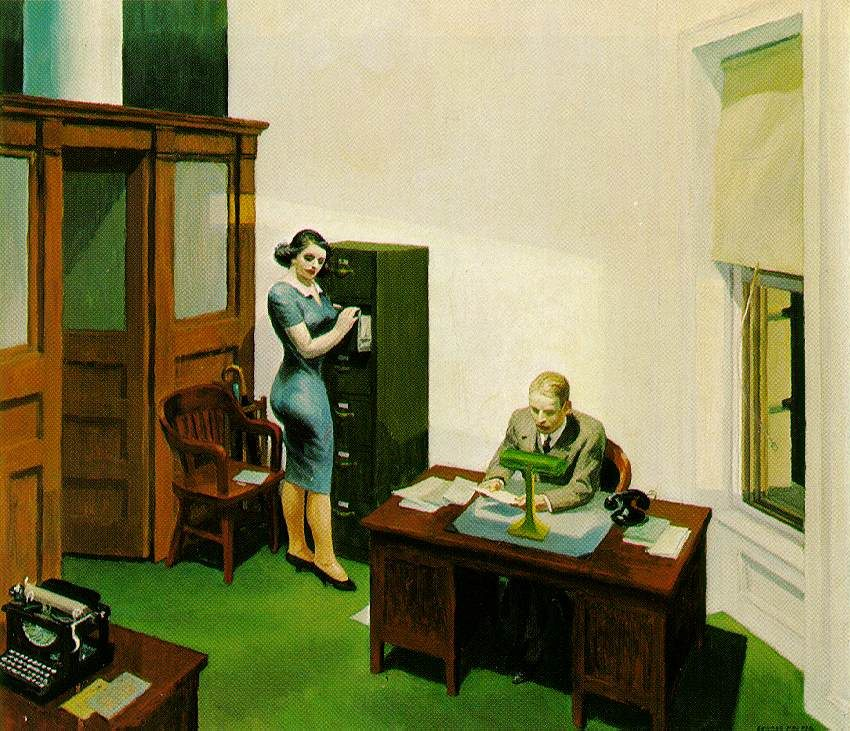
Edward Hopper, Office at Night (1940)

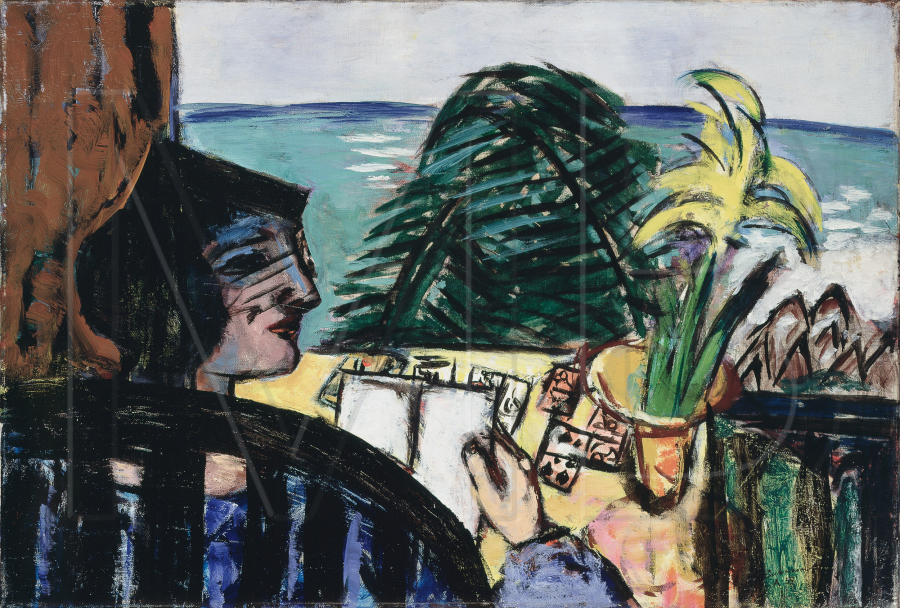
Max Beckmann, Woman Reading at the Beach, 1939

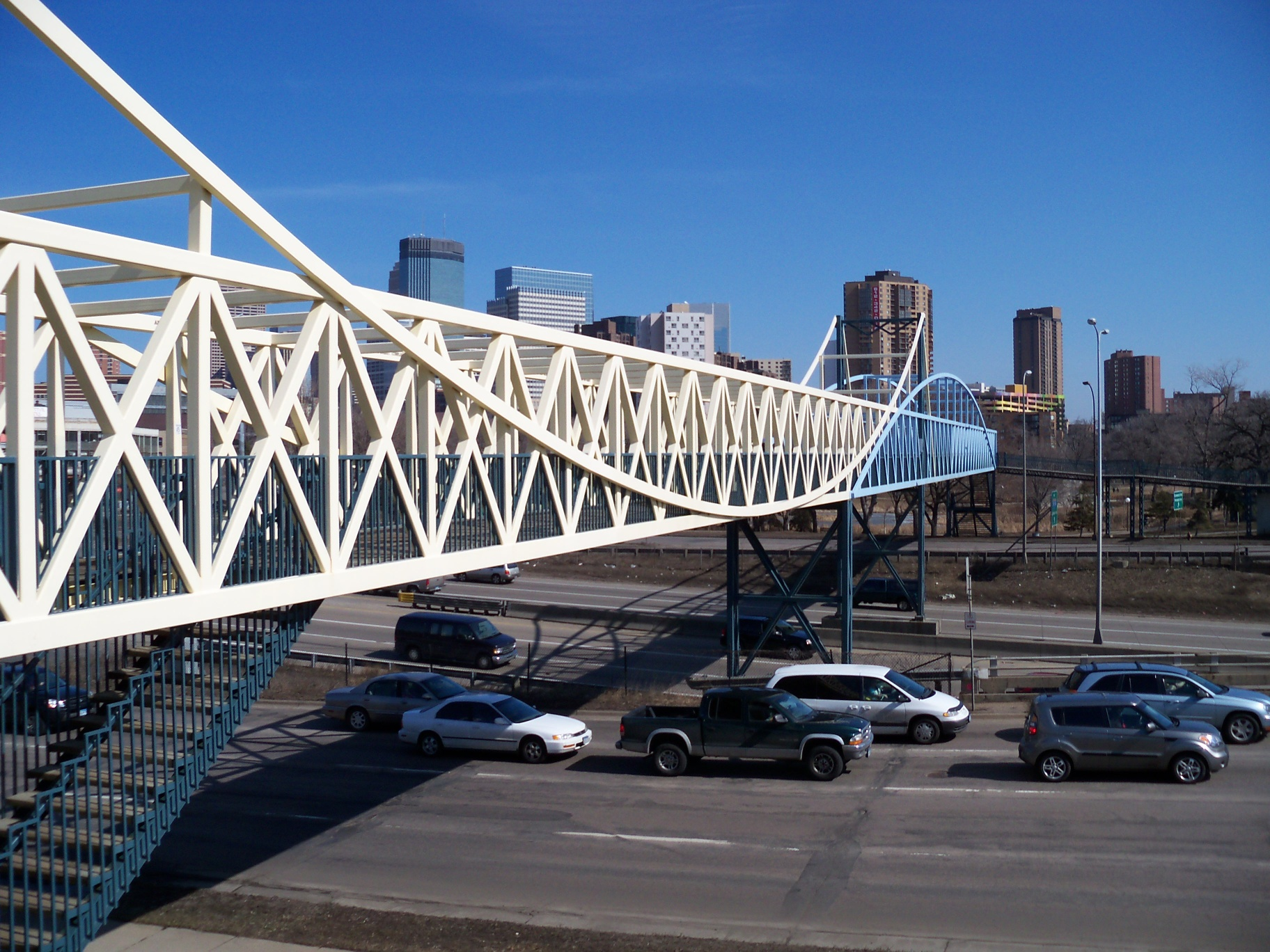
Irene Hixon Whitney Bridge

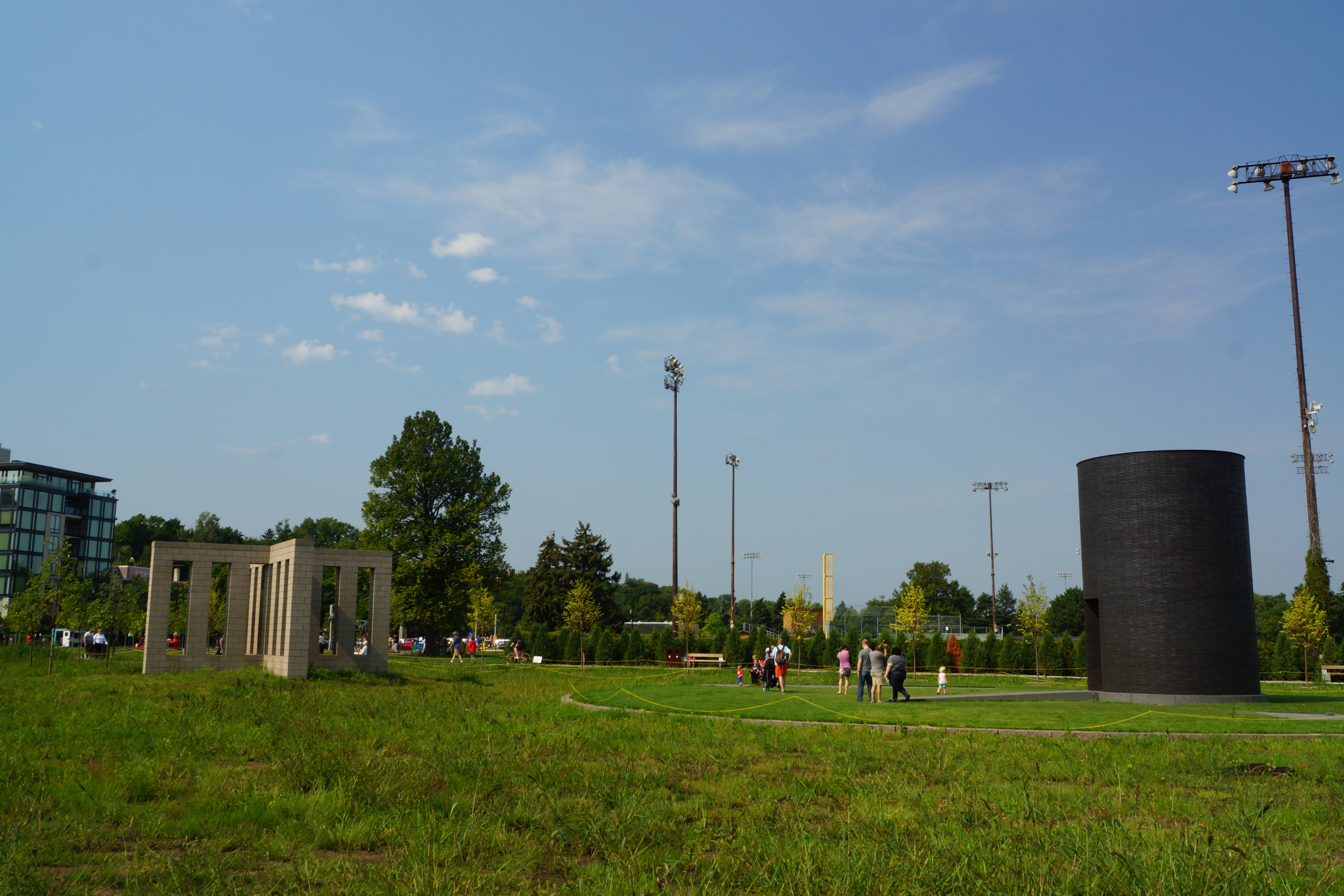
Theaster Gates, Black Vessel for a Saint, 2017

== See also ==
- Minneapolis Sculpture Garden
- MNartists.org
