= Josh Willis =

Oceanographer

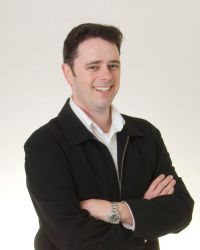
- Education: Scripps Institution of Oceanography
- Known for: Argo (oceanography)
- Spouse: Dixie Aragaki
- Awards: Charles K. Witham Environmental Stewardship Award, JPL, 2011 Ocean Sciences Early Career Award from the American Geophysical Union Bruce Murray Award for Excellence in Education and Public Engagement (2016)
- Scientific career
- Fields: Oceanography
- Workplaces: Jet Propulsion Laboratory
- Thesis: Combining satellite and in situ data to make improved estimates of upper-ocean thermal variability on eddy to global scales (2004)
- Doctoral advisor: Dean Roemmich

Joshua K. Willis is an oceanographer at NASA's Jet Propulsion Laboratory. His area of expertise is current sea level rise, as well as measuring ocean temperatures. When sea level fell from 2010 to 2011, Willis stated that this was due to an unusually large La Niña transferring more rainfall over land rather than over the ocean as usually happens. In addition, Willis is the project scientist for Jason-3.

== Early life and education ==
Josh Willis realized he wanted to be a scientist from a young age. After graduating from high school, Willis studied physics and mathematics at the University of Houston earning his B.S. in 1996. While there, he also received a minor in theater. He then went to the University of California where he received his master's degree in physics in 1998. Willis planned to get his Ph.D. in physics, but realized that it wasn't for him. He failed and was kicked out of the University of California. Soon after, Willis discovered Scripps Institution of Oceanography and began studying the physics of climate change and the ocean's effect on global warming. And in 2004, Willis received his Ph.D. in oceanography.

== Research ==
=== Oceans cooling ===
In 2006, Willis et al. published a time series measuring ocean heat content, which concluded that the ocean had cooled from 2003 to 2005. A similar conclusion was reached by scientists at NASA's Langley Research Center (LRC). While Willis cautioned against drawing conclusions based on such a short time period, the study was widely covered in the media, with climate change deniers citing it as evidence that global warming was no longer occurring. Willis also noted that some model simulations show periods of four to five years during which the upper ocean does not warm. Willis suspected something was awry when the researchers at LRC concluded that Earth's energy imbalance had remained the same over that period of time, which led to a researcher at LRC named Takmeng Wong becoming "surprised, even a little alarmed" at Willis's results. The original 2006 paper has since been corrected, with Willis et al. stating, "Most of the rapid decrease in globally integrated upper (0–750 m) ocean heat content anomalies (OHCA) between 2003 and 2005 reported by Lyman et al. [2006] appears to be an artifact resulting from the combination of two different instrument biases recently discovered in the in situ profile data."

=== Challenger expedition ===
On May 21, 2013, Willis co-authored a paper regarding measurements of ocean temperatures taken during the Challenger expedition in the 1870s, which were compared with measurements from Argo. This paper concluded that the global ocean had indeed warmed since the 1870s, and received wide media attention.

=== Deep ocean warming ===
On October 5, 2014, Willis was a co-author on a paper reporting that the warming of the deep ocean had not contributed to a detectable extent to either sea level rise or the Earth's energy budget. Willis said its findings did not challenge global warming because "the sea level is still rising".

Willis is the Principal Investigator of Oceans Melting Greenland (OMG).

== Comedy ==
=== The Second City ===
Willis is a graduate of the Conservatory Program of The Second City Training Center in Hollywood, CA. He graduated in 2014.

=== Climate Elvis ===
In order to bring comedy to the topics of climate and climate change, Willis created the character "Climate Elvis", and performed a song called "The Climate Rock". The video was directed by Lizze Gordon.

=== Unnecessary Talk with Brian Sturges ===
Willis is a frequent guest on the comedy podcast Unnecessary Talk with Brian Sturges. www.poorlifechoices.TV

=== Wall of Flesh: A Vintage Comedy ===
Willis plays Jake Elwood in the award-winning comedy feature film available for purchase and rental on Amazon and YouTube.com

== Personal life ==
Dr. Willis is married to physiatrist Dr. Dixie Aragaki.

== See also ==
- Justin Brice Guariglia
