= Jockey Club Museum of Climate Change =

Museum in Hong Kong

- 賽馬會氣候變化博物館
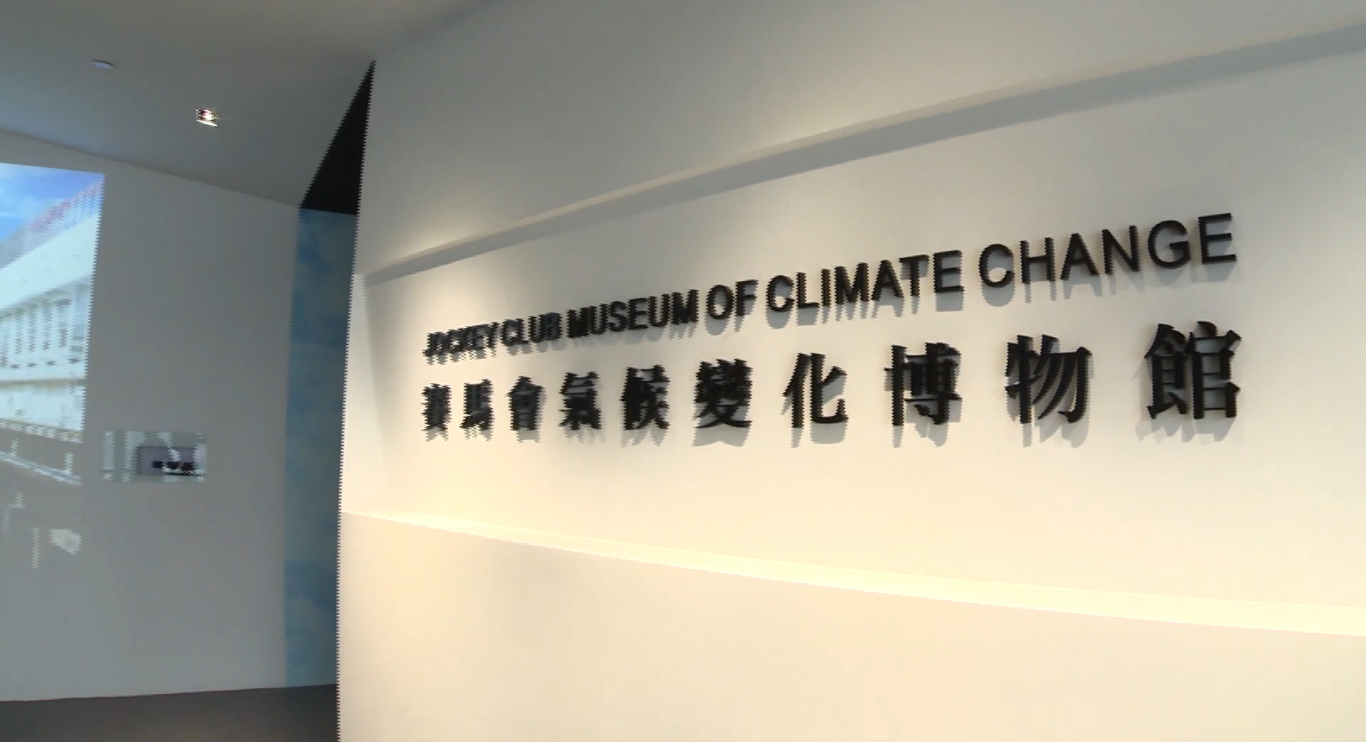
- Jockey Club Museum of Climate Change
- Established: 1 June 2012 (launch of the Jockey Club Earth Conservation Initiative); 16 December 2013 (opening of the museum)
- Location: 8th floor of the Yasumoto International Academic Park, The Chinese University of Hong Kong, Ma Liu Shui, Sha Tin District, New Territories, Hong Kong
- Coordinates: 22.4164°N 114.2111°E
- Type: Climate (natural science, applied science, social science)
- Visitors: More than 300,000 (May 2018)
- Website: http://www.mocc.cuhk.edu.hk/

The Jockey Club Museum of Climate Change (Chinese: 賽馬會氣候變化博物館, abbreviation: MoCC) is a museum dedicated to the theme of climate change located in Sha Tin, Hong Kong. Opened on 16 December 2013, it is the world's first museum focusing on climate change. The museum was initially established by the Jockey Club's Initiative Gaia at The Chinese University of Hong Kong (CUHK) and funded by the Hong Kong Jockey Club Charities Trust, and is situated on the 8th floor of the Yasumoto International Academic Park building at CUHK.

The museum houses a large collection of exhibits gathered by explorer Rebecca Lee from around the world. It features permanent exhibitions on polar climates, environmental protection technologies, and other topics, as well as periodic special exhibitions. Additionally, the museum offers eco-tours outside the museum, where visitors are guided to various environmental protection facilities and measures.

== History ==
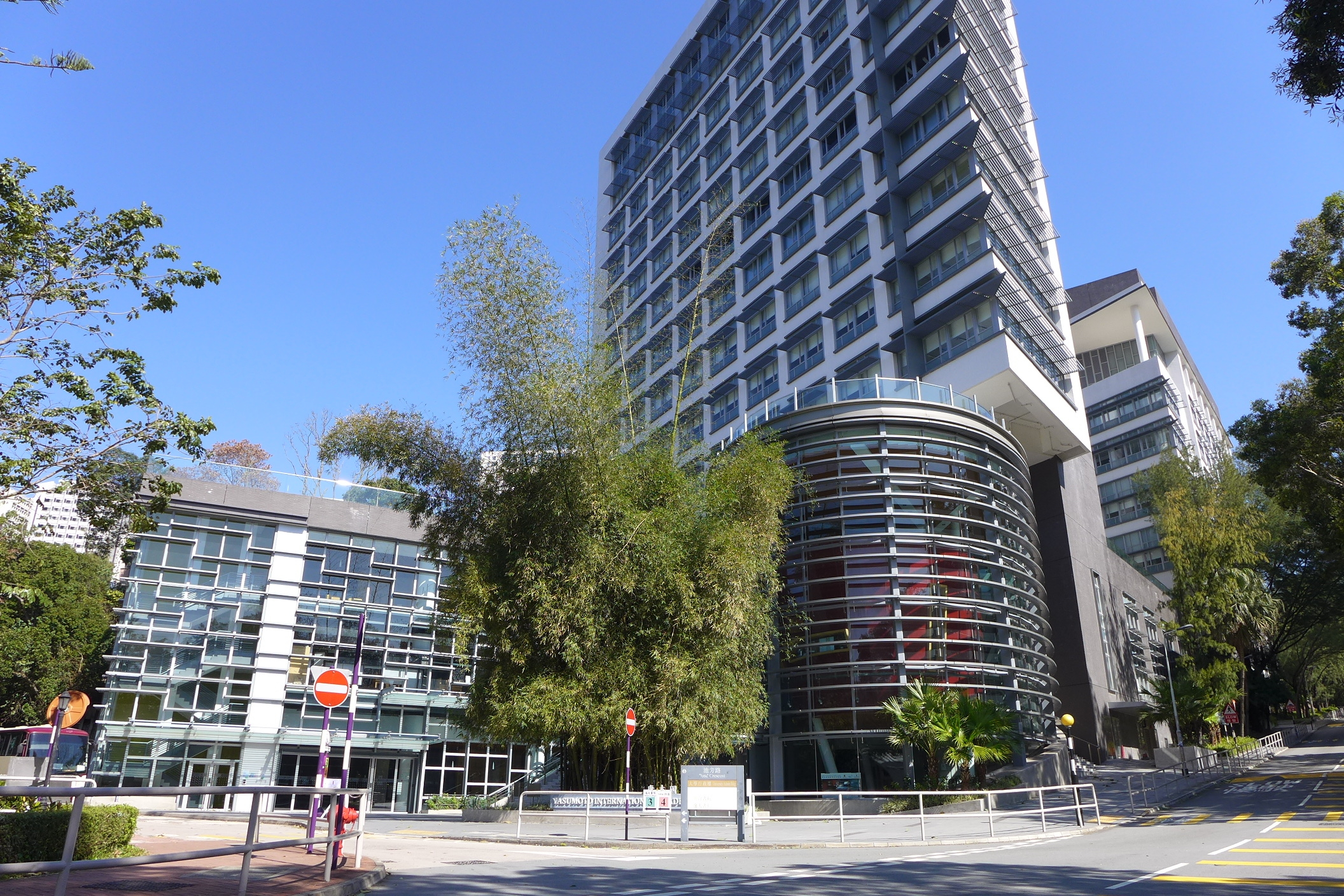
The Jockey Club Museum of Climate Change is located in the Yasumoto International Academic Park building.

The history of the Jockey Club Museum of Climate Change can be traced back to the explorer Rebecca Lee, who began to focus on climate issues as early as the 1980s. In 1987, when she accompanied an expedition team from the State Oceanic Administration of the People's Republic of China to the South Pole, she conceived the idea of establishing a polar museum in Hong Kong. She hoped to raise awareness among Hong Kong people about the severity of climate issues and to attract young people to engage in natural science research. Lee encountered a dangerous situation in Antarctica in 1991, which made her feel that action was urgently needed and that it was necessary to establish a museum to organise information for the next generation. She later founded the Polar Museum Fund in 1997 and served as its director. She considered various locations for the museum, including industrial buildings, small buildings in the New Territories, and schools, but all attempts failed, and she even considered abandoning the plan.

During a 2010 speech by Lee at The Chinese University of Hong Kong (CUHK), the university's president – Joseph Sung – learned of the matter and offered his support. Sung successfully invited the Hong Kong Jockey Club Charities Trust to fund the museum's establishment, while the 8th floor of the Yasumoto International Academic Park building at CUHK was chosen as where the museum would sit. The museum covered an area of approximately 800 m^{2} (8,600 sq ft) and was built using green building techniques, including natural lighting, sun shading, heat insulation devices, and energy-saving facilities. The collaborative programme – the Jockey Club Earth Resources Centre – officially launched on 1 June 2012, and the museum officially opened on 16 December 2013 as the "Jockey Club Museum of Climate Change", bearing the name of its main sponsor.

During the opening of the museum, Lee stated that the museum could promote climate conservation and cultivate new scientific talents. Sung hoped that the museum could provide the public with information on climate change and promote sustainable development in Hong Kong. Christine Loh, then Undersecretary for the Environment of the Hong Kong Government, believed that the Environmental Protection Department and the university could strengthen cooperation through the museum to promote the development of environmental protection in Hong Kong.

After the completion of the collaborative program "Jockey Club Earth Resources Centre" in 2016, the Jockey Club provided funding again in 2017 to implement the three-year "Jockey Club–CUHK Climate Action" plan to support the operation and development of the museum.

== Permanent exhibitions ==
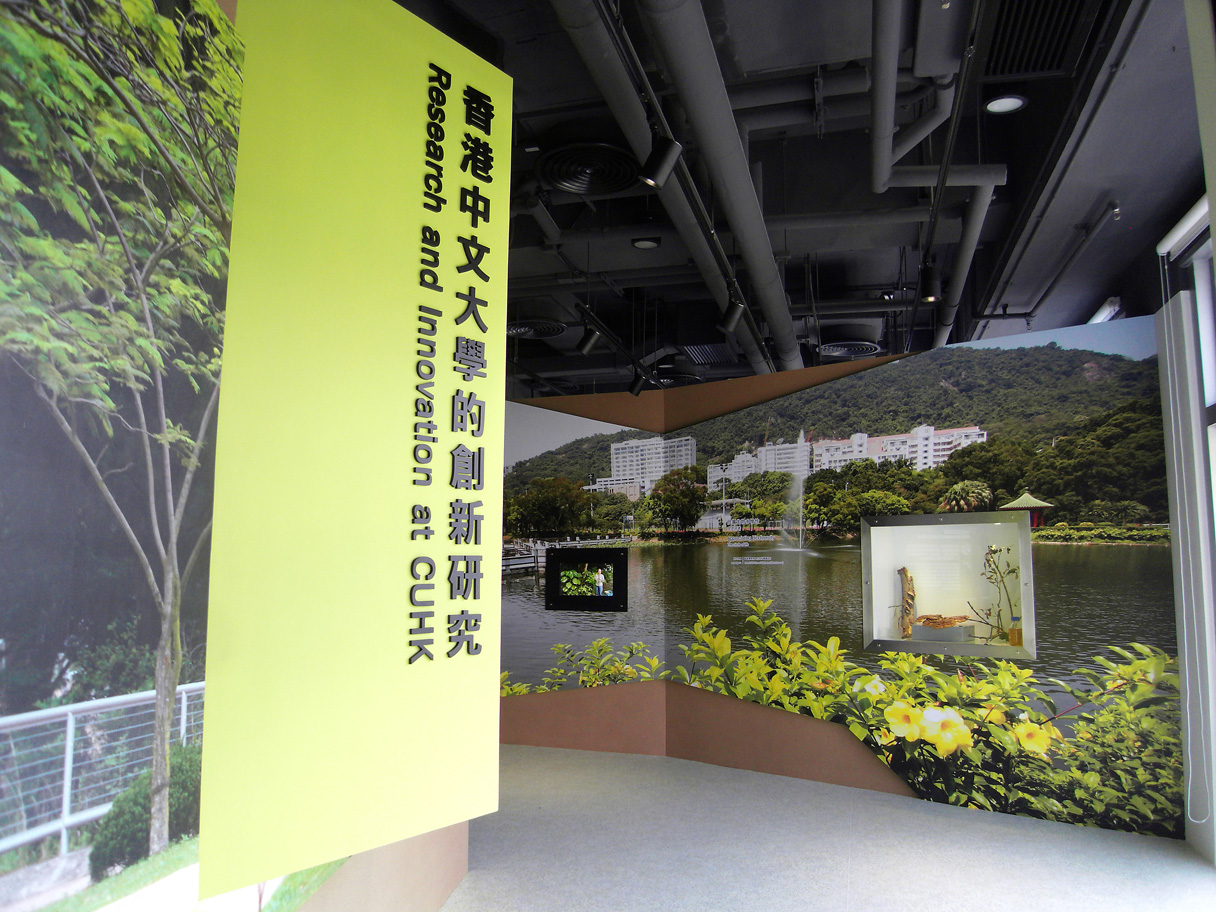
One of the permanent exhibition halls at The Chinese University of Hong Kong is dedicated to innovative research.

The museum is located in Ma Liu Shui, at The Chinese University of Hong Kong, adjacent to the University MTR Station. The campus itself is surrounded by mountains and faces the sea, boasting rich biodiversity, making it suitable for hosting ecological activities based on the museum.

The museum features four permanent exhibition halls, along with thematic exhibitions, covering a total area of approximately 800 m^{2} (8,600 sq ft). The four exhibition areas are the "Polar Corridor", "Satellite Remote Sensing and Environmental Monitoring", "Innovative Research at The Chinese University of Hong Kong", and "Jockey Club Environmental Conservation Corner". The museum houses over 100 exhibits related to climate change or global warming, including specimens of animals and plants, replicas, tools, and various types of images. The exhibitions include over 40,000 photos and videos taken by Rebecca Lee, some of which involved life-threatening risks and incurred high costs to capture scenes from the polar regions. Additionally, the museum incorporates over 50 multimedia installations to help visitors understand climate change issues and research findings from around the world.

Furthermore, the museum offers online virtual tours of its permanent exhibitions, allowing the public to browse information, exhibits, and related explanations on the internet.

=== Polar Corridor ===
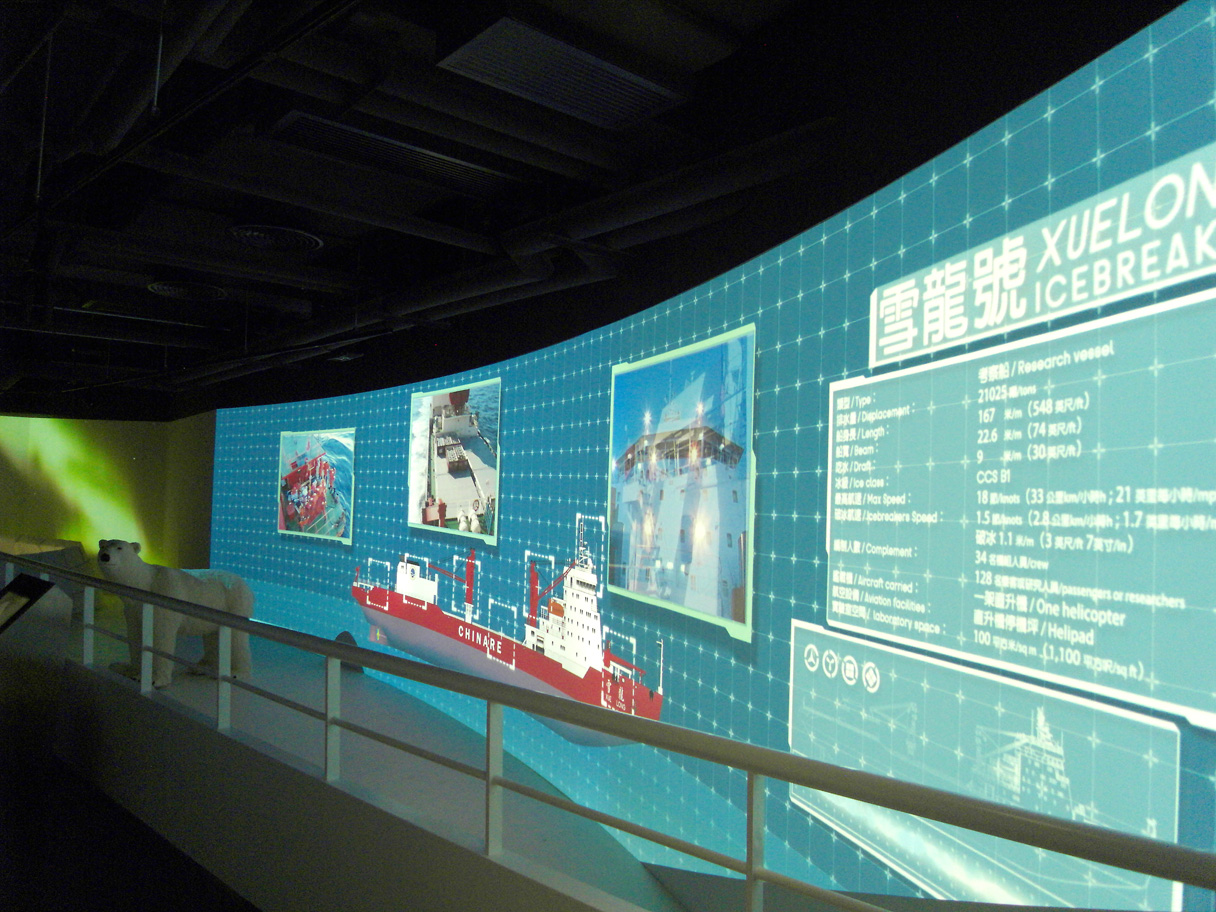
A large projection screen in the Polar Corridor.

The design of the Polar Corridor resembles the icebreaker of the Polar Research Institute of China, Xue Long. It displays a model of the Xue Long to represent the origin of the exhibits and its symbolic significance to China's polar scientific research. The exhibition area features a large projection screen measuring 13 m (43 ft), along with deck design, air conditioning simulating polar cold winds, polar bear models, and projected images of glacier melting on the ground, providing visitors with an immersive experience. The screen primarily showcases segments of climate and ecological changes discovered by the Xue Long during its expedition to the Arctic Ocean in 2008, including record-high temperatures in the Arctic Ocean leading to rare sightings of polar bears feeding near the ship, aiming to help visitors understand environmental issues related to climate change.

The exhibition area displays exhibits donated by Rebecca Lee, most of which were collected from North Pole, the Arctic, and Mount Everest. Numerous exhibits include fossils and specimens of animals and plants, such as emperor penguin eggs from Antarctica, seals from the Arctic, and Tibetan ammonites from Mount Everest, as well as tools and instruments used in polar expeditions. Additionally, a replica of a room at Rebecca Lee's Antarctic scientific research station is displayed to provide insights into the living conditions of expedition members, along with some polar expedition essentials and souvenirs. Concurrently, the exhibition area features a 1:1 model of Lee working outdoors in her expedition attire.

The Chinese Antarctic Research Expedition presented the museum with a giant Antarctic stone eroded into a wind chime shape for exhibition purposes. Due to restrictions under the Antarctic Treaty System, objects on Antarctica cannot be easily taken away. Therefore, Rebecca Lee regards this rare Antarctic wind chime stone as the "treasure of the museum."

=== Satellite Remote Sensing and Environmental Monitoring ===
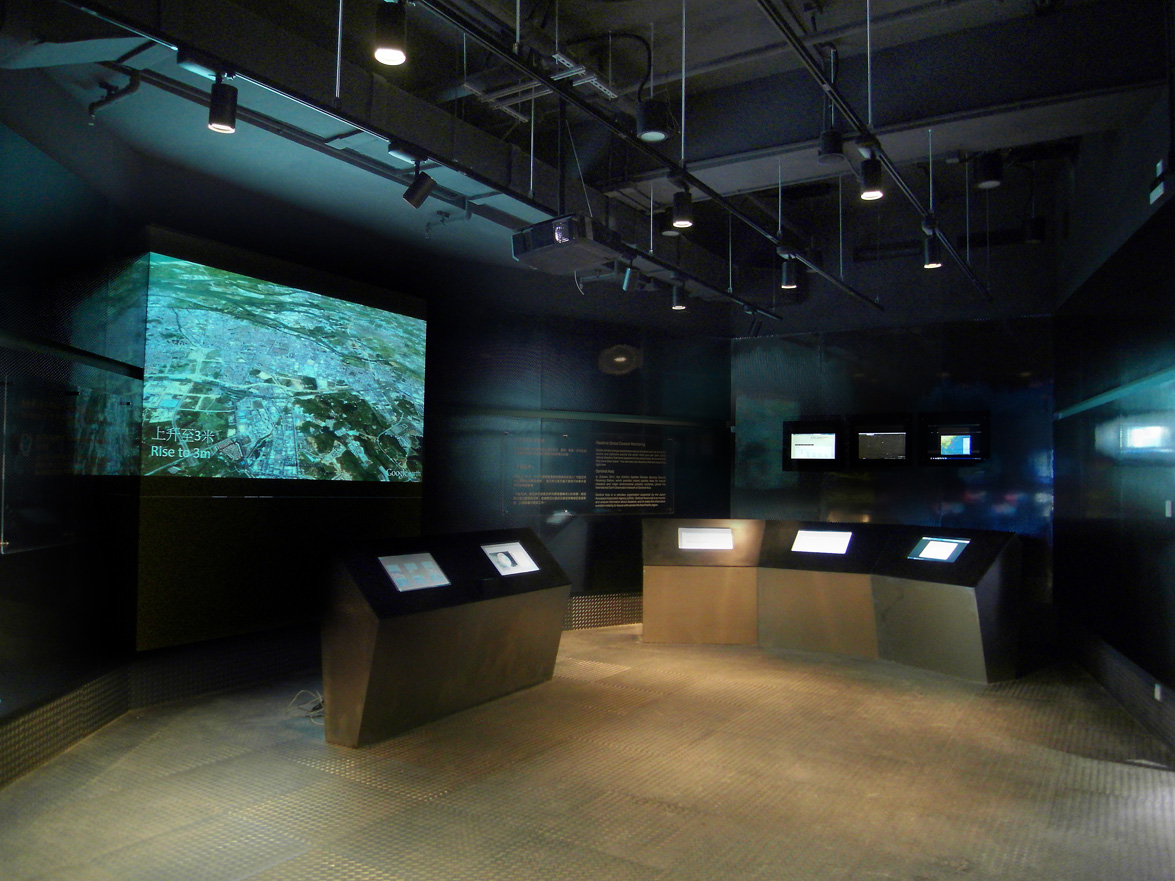
Exhibition area for Satellite Remote Sensing and Environmental Monitoring

The exhibition area of Satellite Remote Sensing and Environmental Monitoring is designed to resemble the control room of the satellite remote sensing ground receiving station at the peak of the Chinese University of Hong Kong. Its purpose is to allow visitors to simulate monitoring personnel, observe various geographical information and satellite images of meteorological, oceanographic, and geological changes in Hong Kong, southern China, and the South China Sea, showcasing the actual impact of climate change on Hong Kong and neighboring areas. This information involves the application of geographic information science in various fields of environmental protection, including air pollution, marine oil spills, and virtual geographic environments.

=== Innovative Research ===
The exhibition area of Innovative Research at the Chinese University of Hong Kong mainly showcases the innovative research achievements of the Chinese University in the fields of environment, energy, and sustainable development aimed at addressing climate change issues. This exhibition area presents research projects of scholars from the Chinese University in natural sciences, applied sciences, and social sciences. In terms of environmental technology, the exhibition area features technologies such as an electronic tree identification system. In the field of energy technology, the exhibition area displays exhibits such as solar cells and technologies for hydrogen production through photocatalytic oxidation of water. Additionally, the exhibition area includes an experimental model demonstrating the existence of the urban heat island effect, emphasizing the importance of sustainable urban design and planning. The museum aims to provide visitors not only with an understanding of research outcomes but also to offer insights into the future development of technology.

=== Hong Kong Jockey Club Environmental Hub ===
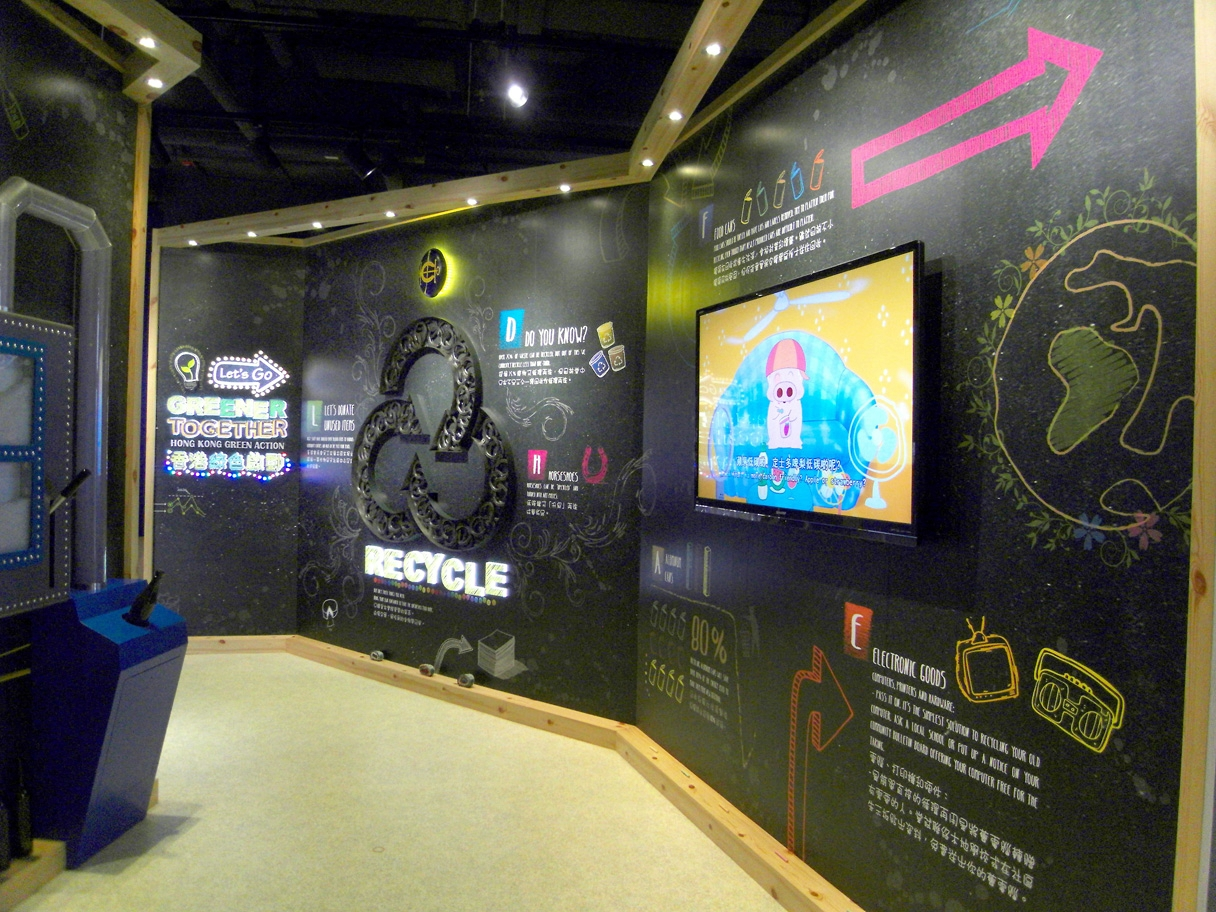
Hong Kong Jockey Club Environmental Hub

The exhibition content focuses on environmental projects participated in by the Hong Kong Jockey Club and community environmental projects supported by its charitable trust fund. The Jockey Club collaborates with McDull, a cartoon character by Brian Tse, to promote low-carbon living in this area. The goal of the exhibition area is to inspire visitors to develop new environmental thinking and promote community environmental projects.

The exhibition area also features artworks made from recycled horse horseshoes provided by the Jockey Club, as well as a simulated factory showcasing the process of recycling glass bottles into synthetic bricks.

== Special exhibitions ==
The museum hosts periodic special exhibitions focusing on the latest information on climate change and the environment. Examples include exhibitions aimed at popularizing climate change science, such as "Climate Change and Its Impacts", and "About Climate Change, What I Want to Say..." featuring concerns of 22 Australian climate scientists. There are also exhibitions combining art and science to address issues like glacier melting, as seen in "Melting Ice and Disintegration".

== Community ==
In its early establishment, the museum was part of the Jockey Club's community donation program "Jockey Club Earth Partner Action". Subsequently, it received continued funding from the Jockey Club for the new program "Jockey Club-CUHK Climate Action", aiming to raise awareness of the potential threats of climate change and translate them into new thinking and practical actions targeting climate change. The museum also recruits students to promote climate action through various public activities.

=== Ecological tours ===
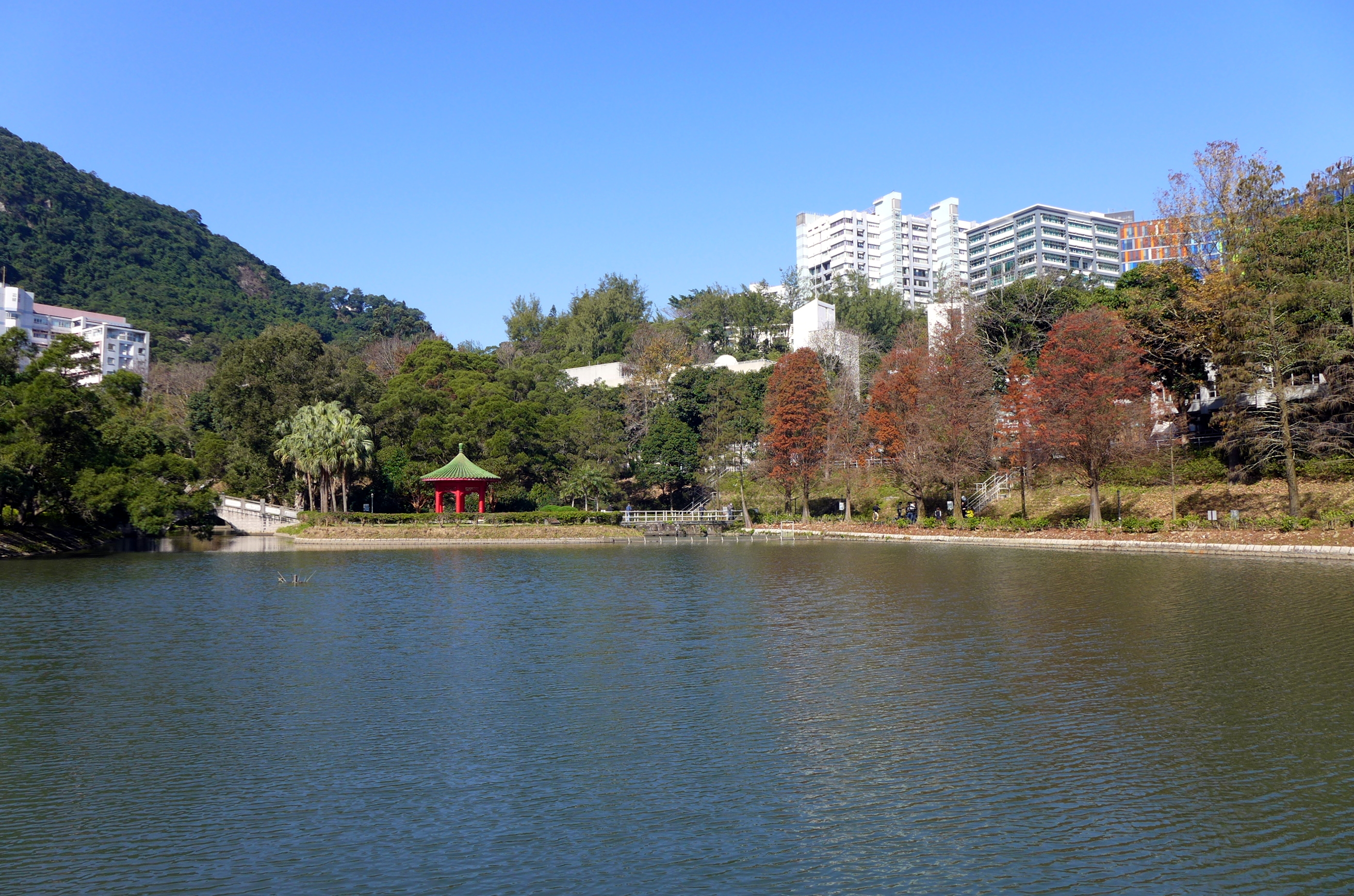
The Lake Ad Excellentiam is one of the stopping points for the museum's ecological tours.

In addition to guided tours inside the museum, ecological tours including museum tours are also available. Each ecological tour lasts about two to three hours and is open to public groups, schools, and various organizations. These tours take visitors outside the museum to explore ecological sites and environmental facilities of the Chinese University of Hong Kong, including the tree study path around the Lake Ad Excellentiam, the solar garden near the University Mall, and the regeneration garden. By introducing natural ecology and the purpose of environmental facilities, these tours aim to promote the importance of sustainable development. Since the museum's opening, many schools, youth organizations such as the Hong Kong Scout Association, and government agencies such as the Hong Kong Observatory and the Agriculture, Fisheries and Conservation Department have participated in the museum's ecological tours.

=== Community education ===
The museum holds multiple workshops on upgrading and remanufacturing, as well as visits to environmental facilities, and occasionally organizes environmental forums. These activities are open to the public, encouraging everyone to actively participate in green living and environmental protection.

Starting from January 2018, the museum has packaged its collection into multimedia interactive modules, loaning them for free to schools, community centers, or non-profit organizations in batches according to different themes, providing the public with easy-to-understand information about climate change. The online multimedia interactive modules allow visitors to simulate interaction with and manipulation of exhibits, exploring the impact of climate change on polar regions from different perspectives.

=== Student guides ===
The museum recruits and trains students from The Chinese University of Hong Kong to become guides, introducing visitors to the museum's exhibitions and assisting in the organization of extended activities, including ecological tours and forums, exhibitions, and workshops held outside the museum. At the same time, university student guides are also responsible for promoting polar ecology, so some of them may have experience in polar expeditions or research. Students from CUHK participating in the museum's internship program not only serve as guides but also have the opportunity to participate in event planning and management at the museum.

== Influence ==
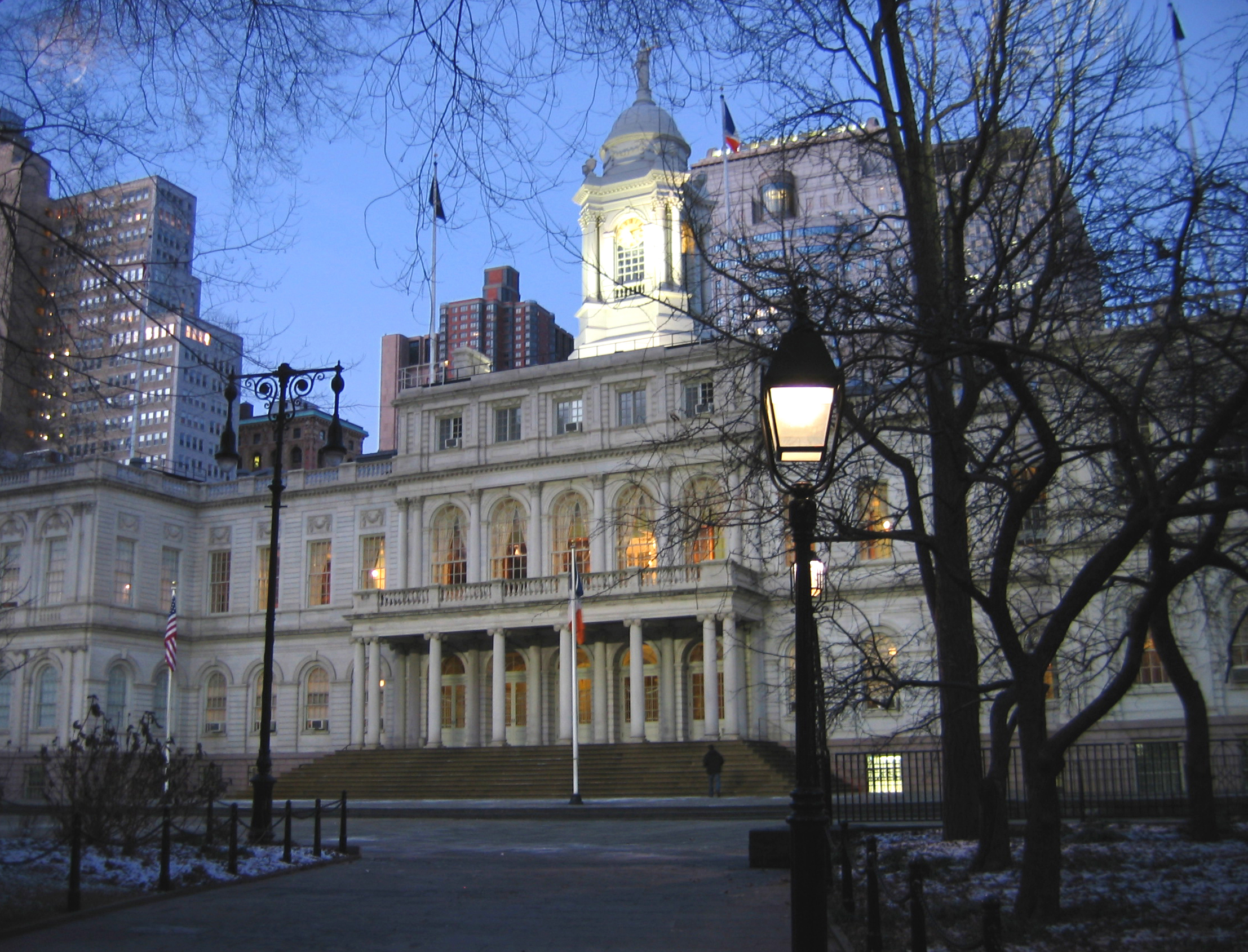
The museum serves as a reference for the New York City government.

As the world's first museum dedicated to climate change, the museum has attracted many environmentalists and scholars.

In terms of local evaluation and impact, several decision-making bodies of the Hong Kong government have included the museum in their promotional lists, such as the Environmental Protection Exhibition Center list of the Environmental Protection Bureau and the database of other learning experiences activities of the Education Bureau. Many Hong Kong travel companies have also included the museum in their itineraries or promotional projects. Major donor Rebecca Lee stated that the museum can encourage the public to take responsibility for protecting the Earth's environment. Deputy Director of the Environmental Protection Bureau, Christine Loh, stated that establishing the museum can share climate change information and knowledge, and the Environmental Protection Department and CUHK can strengthen cooperation to encourage public participation in environmental affairs. NPC Standing Committee member Rita Fan believes that cooperation between the Jockey Club and CUHK can disseminate environmental knowledge and research results to the public in various forms and help society achieve sustainable development in accordance with government policies. However, environmentalist Pang Yiming believes that the museum overly emphasizes the achievements of the People's Republic of China government and Xue Long.

In terms of overseas evaluation and impact, the New York City government sent a delegation to Hong Kong specifically to visit the museum in order to gain inspiration for establishing a new climate museum in Manhattan. After visiting the museum, Miranda Massey, the director of the New York delegation, stated that the museum knows how to use items like the Xue Long to create a storytelling atmosphere, which is conducive to telling climate issues to a wide audience. The interactive content is very worthy of reference, and there is no rendering of Chinese nationalism. The New York delegation believes that there are many opportunities for future cooperation, including exchanging the latest research, technology, and exhibits, and they even invited a representative appointed by the museum to join the advisory committee of the new museum in New York. However, project director Cecilia Yeung candidly admitted that the museum primarily targets Hong Kong residents and nearby visitors, making it difficult to compare with the global museum planned by the New York City government.

== See also ==
- List of museums in Hong Kong
- Xue Long
- Rebecca Lee
