= Sandra Opdycke =

American historian (born 1936)

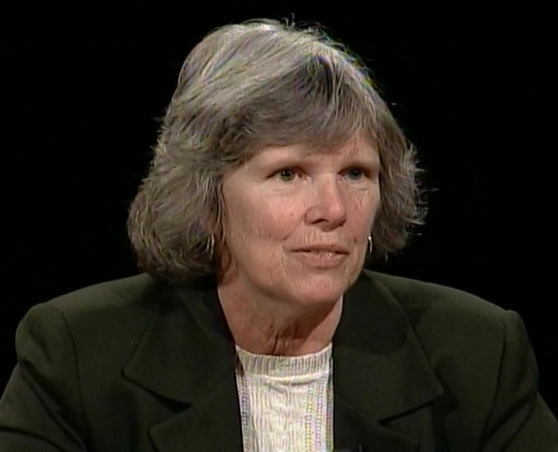
Opdycke on CUNY TV's Urban Agenda, 1999

Sandra Opdycke (born 16 October 1936) is an American historian. She worked at the Hudson River Psychiatric Center, and has taught American History and Urban History at Bard College, Vassar College, and Maris Colleges. She is currently retired.

== Life ==
She was born on 16 October 1936.

== Career ==
She specializes in the history of public health policy.

Her books have received mostly positive reviews. Henrice Altik praised her book The Rutledge Historical Atlas of Women as a useful teaching tool because of its many maps and charts, as well as its focus on both well known and lesser known women in history.

== Bibliography ==
Some of her books are:

- The Routledge Historical Atlas of Women in America
- Jane Addams and her Vision for America
- The Flu Epidemic of 1918: America's Experience in the Global Health Crisis
- No One Was Turned Away: The Role of Public Hospitals in New York City Since 1900
- America's Social Health: Putting Social Issues Back on the Public Agenda
- American Social Welfare Policy: Reassessment and Reform
