= Justin Brice Guariglia =

American photographer and artist

- Born: Justin Brice Guariglia; 1974 (age 51–52); Maplewood, New Jersey, U.S.
- Known for: visual art, photography, sculpture, public art
- Website: www.guariglia.com

Justin Brice Guariglia, also known as Justin Brice (born 1974), is an American conceptual artist and a former photojournalist, whose work explores the relationship between humans and the natural world. Brice frequently partners with scientists, poets and philosophers in his research based art practice that addresses climate change and the ecological crisis. Notably, this includes a series of seven missions he's flown with NASA scientists beginning in 2015 to document Greenland's rapidly changing ice, images which he's used as source material in his work.

He is a former photographer and photojournalist in Asia for 20 years, his work had appeared in National Geographic, Smithsonian, and The New York Times, before he transitioned into an art practice in 2010.

== Biography ==
Justin Brice Guariglia was born in 1974 and grew up in Maplewood, New Jersey. He attended Wake Forest University, graduating with a bachelor of arts degree in 1997. While attending Wake Forest University, he studied abroad initially in 1995 in Venice, Italy at Casa Artom and later in 1996 in Beijing, China at Capital Normal University.

Guariglia lived in Asia over a 20-year period, working as a documentary photographer for 15 of those years. In 2015, Brice moved his studio from Asia back to Brooklyn, New York. In 2018, Sotheby's referred to Guariglia as "one of the most prominent cultural figures working to address climate change."

Guariglia participated in For Freedoms, a Super PAC started by Hank Willis Thomas and Eric Gottesman, which launched a show at Jack Shainman Gallery in 2016. He also created billboards as part of "For Freedoms 50," (2018) on view in Oklahoma City.

In 2017–2018, Guariglia had his first solo exhibition, Earth Works: Mapping the Anthropocene at the Norton Museum of Art in West Palm Beach, Florida.

== Exhibitions and projects ==
=== Venice Biennale 2019 ===
"Artists Need to Create on the Same Scale that Society Has the Capacity to Destroy: Mare Nostrum" (2019) curated by Phong Bui and Francesca Pietropaolo, is an official collateral event of the 58th International Art Exhibition—La Biennale di Venezia. The exhibition is located at the Chiesa di Santa Maria delle Penitenti in the Cannaregio section of Venice during the run of the Biennale Arte, from 11 May – 24 November 2019. Guariglia's contribution included a 2-meter neon artwork, "EXXTINCTION," a play on the classic ExxonMobil logo.

"Artists Need to Create..." includes the work of 73 artists of international backgrounds whose works are in response to environmental crisis in the age of climate change, including Rirkrit Tiravanija, Jack Whitten, Dorothea Rockburne, Amy Sillman, Chuck Close, and others.

=== REDUCE SPEED NOW! (2019) ===
Commissioned by Somerset House, "Reduce Speed Now!" (2019) brings together international perspectives on the world's ecological crisis. Using a series of large solar-powered LED signs usually seen on motorways, Guariglia foregrounds the voices of poets, philosophers, thinkers, activists, and global indigenous elders addressing our climate change, global warming, and extinction.

Other writing includes excerpts from French philosopher and sociologist Bruno Latour’s provocative publications; aphorisms written by eco-theorist Timothy Morton; and Guariglia’s compiled list of 200 years of extinct species.

=== WE ARE THE ASTEROID (2018–present) ===
Guariglia's "WE ARE THE ASTEROID," a series of solar-powered LED message boards that flash eco-aphorisms, debuted at Storm King Art Center in the 2018 exhibition entitled "Indicators: Artists on Climate Change." The project is part of an ongoing collaboration with eco-theorist Timothy Morton, who wrote the text for the work. Iterations of the project have appeared as public art installations in San Francisco, New York City, Chicago, Aspen, Houston.

=== Climate Signals (2018) ===
Guariglia's citywide public art installation "Climate Signals" debuted September, 2018 in ten locations across the five boroughs of New York City. The project, which was presented by the Climate Museum, in conjunction with the New York City Mayor's Office, and the New York City Department of Parks and Recreation, and was designed to encourage dialogue on the issue of climate change. Climate Signals was reviewed by The New Yorker, The New York Times, The Washington Post, and The Guardian, among others.

=== After Ice app (2017–present) ===
On Earth Day 2017, Guariglia launched "After Ice", a free iOS app visualizing sea-level rise based on projections from the IPCC and NASA.

=== Earth Works: Mapping the Anthropocene (2017–present) ===
Guariglia's solo exhibition, Earth Works: Mapping the Anthropocene debuted at the Norton Museum of Art in September 2017. The museum was forced closed within hours of the show opening due to Hurricane Irma, the irony of which was written about by The Washington Post. The exhibition has since traveled to the USC Fisher Museum of Art in conjunction with the Natural History Museum of Los Angeles County. The show contains works derived from source materials collected on flights with NASA, in addition to other aerial topographic images Guariglia took of agriculture and mining in the landscape.

=== Hyperobject (2017) ===
New York City fashion designers Abasi Rosborough collaborated with Guariglia to create "Hyperobject," a collection based on Guariglia's work, and named after Timothy Morton's book and neologism "Hyperobjects". The clothing is cut from organic and/or deadstock fabrics that feature Guariglia's art work.

=== NASA (2015–2020) ===
Guariglia has frequently collaborated with scientists, philosophers, and journalists in order to forge a deeper understanding of human impact on the planet. Notably, this includes a series of seven earth science missions he flew with NASA's Operation Ice Bridge scientists beginning in 2015, documenting Greenland's rapidly changing ice sheets and sea ice. The images became source material for work that debuted in Earth Works: Mapping the Anthropocene.

Beginning in 2016, Guariglia joined with NASA Jet Propulsion Laboratory scientist and OMG mission principal investigator Josh Willis as an artist collaborator.
