= Zaria Forman =

American contemporary artist (born 1982)

- Born: Zaria Lynn Forman; October 29, 1982 (age 43); South Natick, Massachusetts
- Education: Studio Art Centers International; Skidmore College, 2005 B.S.
- Movement: painting: hyperrealism
- Mother: Rena Bass Forman
- Website: www.zariaforman.com

Zaria Forman (born 1982) is an artist from Massachusetts, United States, and specializes in documenting the effects of climate change, especially the impact of global warming on glaciers through hand-drawn pastel sketches, which largely consist of huge chunks of melting ice and crashing or, sometimes, cool waves.

== Life and education ==
Forman was born in South Natick, Massachusetts in 1982 to Rena Bass Forman, her fine art photographer mother, and Dr. Forman, her neuro-ophthalmologist father, she now lives in Brooklyn, New York. Forman's mother, whose work has inspired her own, was a photographer of natural landscapes, portraying glaciers from 2001 until she died in 2011, and was noted as "an heir to the grand tradition of 19th century polar photography practiced by Dunmore and Critcherson, Wilczek, and Hurley."

Forman grew up in Piermont, New York and has a studio in Brooklyn, New York, where she also lives. She went to Green Meadow Waldorf School, and studied art at Studio Art Centers International, Florence, and Skidmore College, New York, where she earned a B.S. in Studio Art in 2005.

As of 2023, Forman is married with one child.

== Work ==
Forman's first series of work, Storms, of "tumultuous skies" was presented in 2004. Her first solo exhibition opened at Case Gallery in Saratoga Springs, in 2005, and has since been exhibited at a number of places, including at Banksy's Dismaland in 2015 and at The Climate Museum in 2017. On average, the measurement of her large-scale pastel drawings is five by seven-and-a-half feet, which are brought to life following thousands of photographs Forman taken by Forman, and after a few small sketches made by her on-site.

Soon after her 2005 exhibition, Forman visited Greenland with her mother, and was inspired by "gorgeous icebergs" after seeing her first glacier in 2007. Soon after, in 2008 and 2010, Forman made trips to Svalbard, Norway to study arctic light, water and archipelago ice further. In August 2012, Forman led Chasing the Light, a sailing expedition along Greenland's northeast coast. The expedition followed in the vein of William Bradford's 1869 expedition. Another trip aboard the Wanderbird was organised in 2014, followed by an invitation to go on the NASA's Operation IceBridge in 2016 and 2017, focussed on documenting changes in Earth's polar ice. Her work also featured on the office walls of Robin Wright's House of Cards character, Claire Underwood, in 2013.

While she had been avoiding ice, feeling "technically unprepared to capture its elusive qualities", Forman "began to draw ice in 2012," following the expedition where she led a group of artists and scholars along Greenland's coastline. The said expedition was initially planned with her mother, who died in 2011 from brain cancer at the age of 57. With National Geographic Explorer, she was also on a month-long expedition to Antarctica, which was followed by Antarctica, a 13-piece 2017 exhibition at Winston Wächter Fine Art gallery in Seattle.

Following discussions which commenced before the pandemic, it was revealed in 2023 that Forman had joined the Swiss watchmaker Vacheron Constantin as their 'One of Not Many' ambassador, and had gone on a trip to Fellsfjara, Iceland for them. She was also the face of their Overseas collection, launched during that time. Forman is also a yoga teacher and jewellery designer, although she has stopped doing both.

== Praise ==
Forman's work, which includes pieces that can take upwards of 200 hours to complete, has received much praise. Earth Island Journal's managing editor, Zoe Loftus-Farren, wrote in a review of her work that "Forman can do with soft pastels, her fingers, and a canvas [what] is almost unbelievable." Writing for the Oprah Magazine in 2019, Zoe Donaldson praised the "majestic blue-and-white results [of Forman's artistry, that are] smudged and rubbed into being," for how they interact with our changing climate. Max Kutner, of Smithsonian Magazine, wrote Forman's work "could easily be mistaken for photographs." Writing for National Geographic, Rachel Link confesses she thought she was looking at one, noting their depiction of sites "profoundly affected by climate change" as "astonishingly tangible and compelling."

In early 2014, one of Forman's pastel drawings of an iceberg was among the most famous images on Reddit, holding the number one position on the forum social network. In 2020, the Alumni Board at Forman's alma mater, Skidmore College, called her work "[i]mpeccably naturalistic" on presenting Forman with the Creative Thought Matters Award of Distinction. Writing for the Alpinist Magazine in 2020, Mailee Hung, who says "[w]atching Zaria work is hypnotic", noted her art as having the capability of "forging a visceral bond between viewer and subject." Introducing her interview for the UNESCO Courier in 2025, Anuliina Savolainen said about Forman's work that they bring "to life the fragile beauty of icy landscapes."

== Awards ==
- 2020: The Creative Thought Matters Award of Distinction, Skidmore College
