= David Opdyke =

American artist

David Opdyke (born 1969) is an American visual artist who works in sculpture and installation. He was born in Schenectady, New York, and lives in Queens.

== Work ==
Opdyke's work explores issues surrounding consumerism, globalization and environmental degradation. His found-postcard installation, This Land, portrays an idealized version of Americana upon first viewing. Upon closer scrutiny, viewers realize that each postcard includes painted interventions such as wildfires, locust swarms, tornadoes and similar "natural disasters" depicting the effects of climate change. Other painted additions include human responses or cultural interventions that feebly attempt to mitigate environmental disasters. In 2022, This Land was included in the exhibition, Someday, all this, at the Climate Museum's pop-up space in Soho, New York.

Opdyke's work has received critical attention in The Paris Review, the Detroit Art Review, Hyperallergic, The New York Times, among other publications.

He graduated from the University of Cincinnati College of Design, Architecture, Art, and Planning in 1992.

== Awards and honors ==
- 2004 - Aldrich Contemporary Art Museum Emerging Artist Award
- 2018 - New York Foundation for the Arts fellowship (in painting)

== Collections ==
Opdyke's works are held in the permanent collections of the Museum of Modern Art, New York; the Brooklyn Museum, and other venues.

== Publications ==
Monacelli Press/Phaidon published a monograph on his work, with essays by Maya Wiley and Lawrence Weschler.
