= Karen Power =

Irish composer

- Born: 1977 (age 48–49)
- Website: karenpower.ie

Karen Power (born 1977) is a composer whose work spans compositions for orchestras, to sound installations. Power has been known to incorporate everyday sounds into her works.

Power received a Ph.D. in acoustic and electroacoustic composition with Michael Alcorn at Queen's University Belfast in 2009. In 2013 her first CD was released. Power has created works for RTÉ, ConTempo Quartet, Sonar Quartet and Ultrasound Berlin. Her compositions have been performed by the RTÉ National Symphony Orchestra, Ensemble Modern and Quiet Music Ensemble. She is involved in Irish group Sounding the Feminists. Power has also been the composer in residence in Cork, Galway and Berlin.
