= Virtual geographic environments =

Virtual geographic environments (VGEs) are geographic analysis tools. A VGE is a multi-user, intelligent virtual environment which represents an actual geographic feature; it is used for geo-spatial analysis, geo-visualization, and geography-related planning and decision making, as well as for training, education, and entertainment.
