= Call It English: The Languages of Jewish American Literature =

2006 book by Hana Wirth-Nesher

- Cover
- Author: Hana Wirth-Nesher
- Language: English
- Subject: Jewish American literature, Multilingualism, Literary criticism
- Genre: Literary criticism, Academic study
- Publisher: Princeton University Press
- Publication date: 2006
- Publication place: United States
- Media type: Print
- Pages: 240
- Awards: National Jewish Book Award runner-up (2006), Choice Outstanding Academic Title (2007)
- ISBN: 978-0-691-13844-2

Call It English: The Languages of Jewish American Literature is a 2006 book by Hana Wirth-Nesher, a professor of English and American studies at Tel Aviv University, published by Princeton University Press. It examines the presence of Hebrew, Yiddish and Aramaic in the English prose of Jewish American writers from the 1890s onward, with chapters on Abraham Cahan, Mary Antin, Henry Roth, Saul Bellow, Cynthia Ozick and Philip Roth, among others. Wirth-Nesher argues that the traces these languages leave in English—accents, puns, half-translations, snatches of liturgy—give Jewish American writing much of its character and set it apart from other American ethnic literatures. The book was a runner-up for the 2006 National Jewish Book Award in Modern Jewish Thought and was named one of Choice's Outstanding Academic Titles for 2007.

== Summary ==
The book follows Jewish American prose from the 1890s to the end of the twentieth century, asking what became of Hebrew, Yiddish and Aramaic once their speakers' descendants wrote in English. It is divided into two parts, the first on immigrant writers and the second on their native-born successors.

The immigrant chapters are set against the nativist language politics of the early twentieth century. Wirth-Nesher reads Abraham Cahan's Yekl: A Tale of the New York Ghetto (1896) through its rendering of accent and dialect, and through Cahan's dealings with William Dean Howells and American realism. Mary Antin's The Promised Land (1912) appears as an account of linguistic passing—an author writing her way out of a Yiddish accent—whose manuscript revisions betray anxieties the published book conceals. The part closes with Henry Roth's Call It Sleep (1934), whose traffic among Yiddish, Hebrew and street English Wirth-Nesher takes as the founding work of Jewish American modernism.

The second part turns to native-born writers after the Holocaust. A chapter on Saul Bellow runs from his translation of Isaac Bashevis Singer's "Gimpel the Fool" through Seize the Day, Herzog and Mr. Sammler's Planet, attending to what Bellow translates, half-translates or leaves in the original, and to his gradual willingness to present Judaism on equal footing with Christianity rather than as local color. A chapter on Cynthia Ozick centers on The Shawl, tracing the infant Magda back to Paul Celan's "Todesfuge" and Goethe's Faust. The closing chapter pairs Philip Roth's American Pastoral with Aryeh Lev Stollman's The Far Euphrates, two novels in which impaired speech stands in for a lost linguistic inheritance.

One thread running through the book is the Kaddish, which surfaces in text after text; its untranslated Aramaic is, for Wirth-Nesher, the piece of liturgy that assimilation never fully absorbs.

Much of the argument proceeds through very close reading—of character names, transliterations, single loanwords and bilingual puns. Wirth-Nesher takes her bearings from the Yiddish critic Baal-Makhshoves, who wrote in 1918 that Jewish literature had always carried "two languages and a dozen echoes from other foreign languages."

What separates the Jewish case from other American ethnic literatures, she argues, is that Jewish multilingualism long predates immigration: Hebrew and Yiddish divided sacred and vernacular functions between them, used a non-Roman alphabet, and bound speech to text in their own way. On this account the multilingual residue in Jewish American writing is not stylistic ornament but the ground of the literature itself.

== Reviews ==
Emily Budick praised Wirth-Nesher for providing a book that "deals with texts but discusses textual language as well" in an era when much literary criticism "hovers above texts and barely engages them." Budick commended Wirth-Nesher's attention to the multiple meanings of names throughout Jewish American literature, calling her analysis "nothing short of masterful." The reviewer highlighted how the book demonstrated that even seemingly assimilated writers like Philip Roth reveal how "the absorption of Jews into American culture is never as complete and seamless as it might at first appear," with Merry Levov's stutter in American Pastoral functioning as "the body remembering" what the intellect would choose to forget. Budick found the omission of Sephardic/Ladino sources somewhat lamentable but concluded that this detracted only minimally from "an otherwise illuminating and comprehensive study."

Irene Tucker characterized the work as telling "the story of a group of twentieth-century American fiction writers who call the language in which they write their narratives English," noting that for these writers, "English is not merely a language to be used but a problem, an aspiration, an object of mourning, a reification." Tucker praised Wirth-Nesher's "erudite and textured readings" that reveal how the book's achievement lies in its focus on "the shifting relations of Yiddish and Hebrew not only to English but to one another," demonstrating the inadequacy of simple assimilation narratives. The reviewer was impressed by Wirth-Nesher's close reading of Cahan's wordplay, where understanding the pun "dod'l do" requires readers to "be American and, while reading this work, also foreign." Tucker also praised the author's analysis of how Hebrew came to replace Yiddish as "the primary Jewish language in relation to which Jewish American writers define and imagine their use of English," representing not just a linguistic shift but a "transcendentalizing" movement. While largely persuaded by Wirth-Nesher's arguments about the kaddish becoming central to late twentieth-century Jewish American literature as "a signifier of the essence of Judaism or Jewishness," Tucker questioned whether the movement into Hebrew could be entirely aligned with this transcendentalizing impulse, noting that post-Six-Day War writers experienced Hebrew differently as a living, spoken language rather than purely liturgical one.

American multilingual literature scholar Alan Astro praised Wirth-Nesher's approach to avoiding what he saw as the trap of sentimentalizing lost European Jewish life, and lauded how she carefully distinguished between genuine linguistic heritage and nostalgic reconstruction. Astro also praised her reversal of assimilationist norms, showing how contemporary writers like Ozick incorporated Yiddish and Hebrew words "untranslated and sometimes even untransliterated" as special assets for readers rather than obstacles. Astro emphasized the importance of Wirth-Nesher's treatment of the Kaddish as it appeared throughout Jewish American literature, serving as both a site of cultural continuity and a marker of linguistic boundaries, though suggested the book might have benefited from addressing Sephardic writers and their Ladino heritage to complete the picture of Jewish American multilingualism.

In her review of the book, American writer, Dina Weinstein, described Wirth-Nesher as revealing how "an allusion-rich swirl of Jewish languages—including Hebrew, Aramaic, Polish, German, English, and, above all, Yiddish" marks Jewish American literature with what she calls "'accents'—'multilingual overtones' that an alert reader needs to be attuned to." Weinstein praised Wirth-Nesher's "often astonishing talent as a close reader of literary texts," mentioning specific examples such as "the deeper meanings of the soulful Yiddish 'Ach!' in Grace Paley's wonderful short story 'The Loudest Voice'" and the various biblical and Haggadah allusions in Henry Roth's Call It Sleep. She paraphrased the author's "grand statement" that Roth's "rich interlingual word play...opens up a new cultural and linguistic space, bringing Jewish American literature into being." While acknowledging that the book's intense interpretive focus on specific literary works made it primarily designed for scholars, Weinstein concluded that for readers who wished to "sharpen their ears to the linguistic resonances" in major Jewish American writers, the work offered "a challenging—and richly rewarding—exercise in close, culturally-attuned reading."

Sarah Ponichtera situated the book within recent critical works on Jewish American modernism that "draw on a theme such as language or exile, shared between American Jews and modernist thought." Ponichtera noted that Wirth-Nesher "establishes that the Jewish aspect of an English-language work can often be traced to an echo of a Jewish language in the text, based on her innovative reading of the paradigmatic Jewish American modernist Henry Roth." Ponichtera praised how the book demonstrated that "modernism allowed American Jews to take an active role in shaping American literature" through their shared proclivities including "the experience of exile; a focus on scholarship; an international awareness, particularly reflected in the knowledge of foreign languages; an interest in linguistic play; and a concern with the proper role of the aesthetic in social life."

Steven Fink described the work as consolidating decades of Wirth-Nesher's scholarship into "a whole that is genuinely greater than the sum of its parts." Fink traced the book's chronological narrative from first-generation immigrants through contemporary writers, and emphasized how it delineated the evolution and importance of multilingualism in Jewish American literature. While he praised Wirth-Nesher's meticulous analysis and provocative introductory chapter, Fink noted occasional moments where her creative exploration of multilingual wordplay risked becoming overly clever, such as her reading of the name "Tom" in Bellow's work as an allusion to Singer's "Gimpel Tam," though he found such instances were "abundantly outweighed by the thoughtful, meticulous, and richly illuminating reflections." Fink wrote: "it should be required reading for anyone teaching a course on Jewish American literature."

Jewish literature scholar Wendy Ilene Zierler positioned the book as building on Baal-Makhshoves's 1918 insight that Jewish literature has always been multilingual, noting that "for many Jewish American writers subsequent to the immigrant generation, Hebrew and Yiddish are sources of self-expression and identity even if the authors cannot 'remember' them in the sense of ever having possessed them as a means of communication." Zierler emphasized how Wirth-Nesher combined detailed observations about individual words, translation choices, and biblical allusions with broader cultural analysis. She praised the recurring motifs that connected chapters—such as the goat-kid imagery that appeared in both the Antin and Roth analyses—and welcomed Wirth-Nesher's masterful explanation of how in Roth's novel, the Passover's "Chad godya" transformed into the American "Christ it's a kid!"

American literary critic Jules Chametzky praised the book as one of three significant works that "attest to the importance of Jewish American writers in the general mosaic of American literature and culture." Chametzky argued that Jewish writers achieved breakthrough recognition into mainstream American literature in the 1950s, alongside Southern writers, before the later recognition of African American and women writers. He found Wirth-Nesher's Israeli perspective particularly valuable, pointing out that she sees Jewish American literature "through her adopted Israeli lens" which provides her with "extraordinary and challenging insights into standard Jewish American texts and their debts to and evasions of Jewish history." He drew attention to her "brilliant" readings of various languages—Hebrew, Yiddish, and Aramaic—that appear in the texts she considers, including her analysis of Bellow's relation to Jewish languages in his translation of Singer's "Gimpel the Fool" and the "shifts and omissions" in "Seize the Day." While noting what he perceived as an early Israeli bias against Yiddish and somewhat unforgiving treatment of Mary Antin and Philip Roth for their "putting down" of their Yiddish past, Chametzky thought that the book's virtue lies in "its ability to provoke serious revaluations and serious discussion of issues for anyone concerned with Jewish American literature, in all its variety and consequentiality."

In his review, Ronald Bush stressed how Wirth-Nesher's linguistic focus enabled her to trace Jewish American writing's evolution from immigrant struggles with English to contemporary writers who may lack knowledge of Hebrew or Yiddish yet still seek connection to these languages. Bush highlighted her analysis of Henry Roth's Call It Sleep as particularly significant, noting how she demonstrated Roth's modernist techniques that pit "David's languages and his cultural selves against each other, making us as readers self-conscious about the artificiality of language and cultural value." He suggested, however, that while Wirth-Nesher successfully framed the novel as a story of Americanization, she might have insufficiently acknowledged its dimension as a portrait of artistic development, and that her account somewhat homogenized English literary practice by simplifying the relationship between Roth's work and Joyce's modernist texts.

Jewish historian, Scott Ury characterized the work as demonstrating how Wirth-Nesher successfully makes apparent how "the authors whose work she engages" contribute to readers' understanding of "the significance of the kaddish" in Jewish American literature. While largely persuaded by Wirth-Nesher's case, Ury suggested that her discussion would have benefited from "more consistently used her subtle and learned spot readings" to reflect on questions of genre and narrative. He also questioned whether the movement into Hebrew could be thoroughly aligned with what Wirth-Nesher associates with the new centrality of the kaddish, noting that the revival of Hebrew as a spoken idiomatic language in Israel has influenced Jewish American writers who came of age after the Six-Day War differently than their parents' generation.

Jaime Cleland opened her review by invoking historian Marcus Lee Hansen's formulation that "what the son wishes to forget the grandson wishes to remember," seeing this as the framework for Wirth-Nesher's study of evolving attitudes toward language across generations. Cleland detailed how even the humblest European shtetl dweller would have been conversant in multiple languages—Yiddish for home life, Hebrew for prayer, and Polish or Russian for interaction with Gentile majorities—yet in America, "the richness of this multilingualism seemed to pale beside the promises of English." Cleland also traced how Wirth-Nesher demonstrated that while immigrants might eagerly repudiate Yiddish and even Hebrew as markers of difference, their grandchildren continued to be haunted by these phantom languages of the past.

R. H. Solomon welcomed the book's methodological sophistication in analyzing how linguistic elements functioned beyond mere ethnic markers. Solomon noted Wirth-Nesher's attention to the complex relationship between Abraham Cahan and William Dean Howells, showing how each writer paradoxically served as cultural gatekeeper for the other—Howells providing Cahan access to American literary markets while Cahan possessed the European cultural capital Howells valued. Solomon observed that by mid-century, Jewish American writers like Bellow had to work to maintain their position in the mainstream, with Bellow not fully able to present Judaism as equal to Christianity until the 1970s, when he could finally "outgrow his role as 'cultural mediator.'"

Choice wrote about the book: "No book traces the stories of Jewish sound, voice, tone, pun, metaphor, name, prayer, and sacred syllable with such consistency and brilliance."
