= Room in Brooklyn =

1932 painting by Edward Hopper

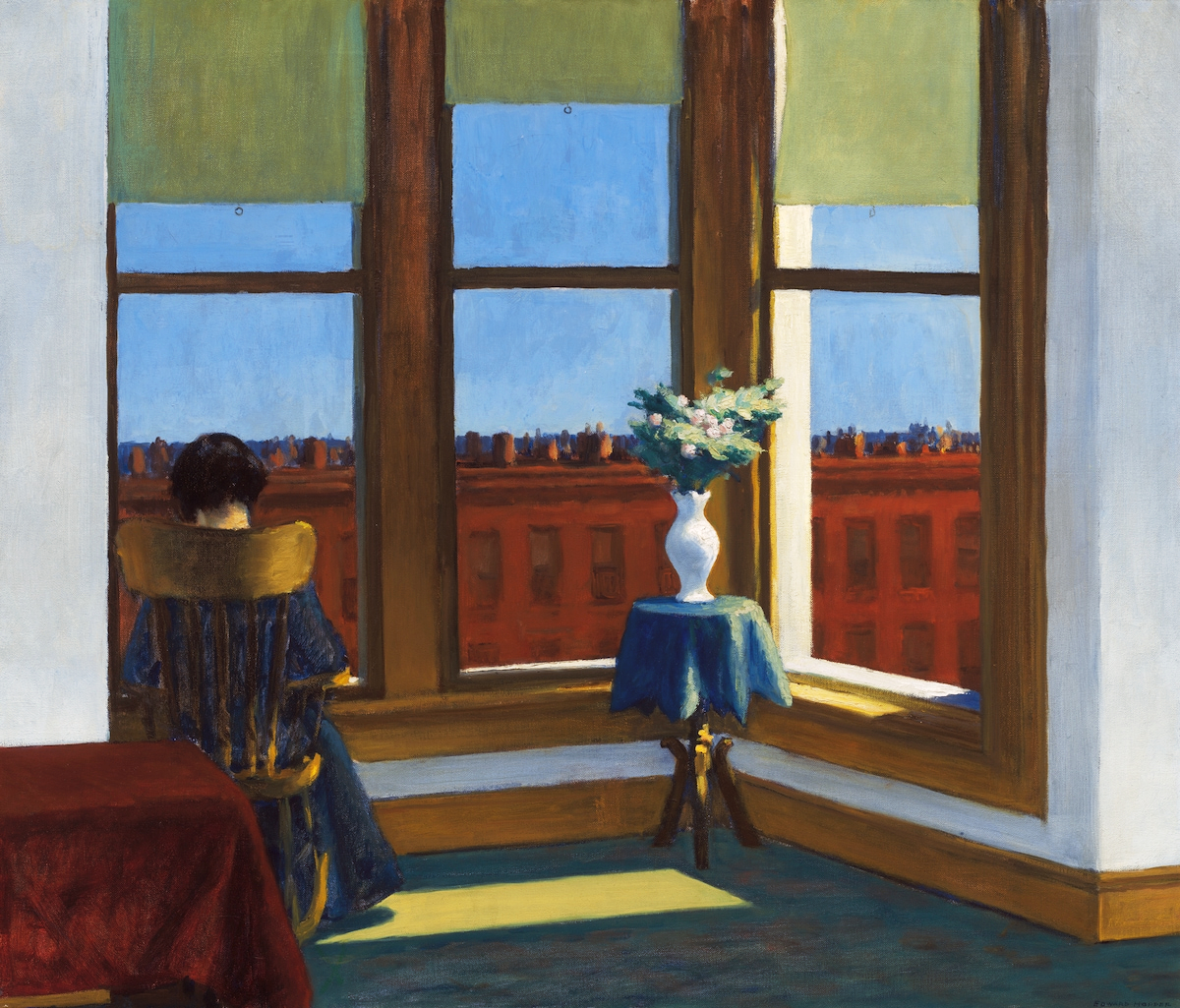
- Artist: Edward Hopper
- Year: 1932
- Medium: Oil on canvas
- Dimensions: 73.98 cm × 86.36 cm (29 1/8 in × 34 in)
- Location: Museum of Fine Arts, Boston
- Accession: 35.66

Room in Brooklyn is a 1932 oil on canvas painting by the American artist Edward Hopper. It depicts a woman in a rocking chair looking out a bay window at a cityscape, with sunlight entering the room. Hopper improvised and completed the work at his Greenwich Village studio around the same time as its possible companion piece, Room in New York.

The painting evokes the style of Caspar David Friedrich through its use of the Rückenfigur motif and also shows the influence of fellow realist John Sloan, whose interior city scenes Hopper admired. Continuing his long-running exploration of figures in sunlit rooms, Room in Brooklyn is his only major painting to include flowers, since Hopper generally disliked painting them.

The work was first exhibited that year at the Modern American Paintings show at the Carnegie Institute, alongside his previous painting, Chop Suey (1929). It is held in the collection of the Museum of Fine Arts, Boston.

== Description ==
In an interior scene, a woman wearing a blue garment, possibly a dressing gown, sits, on the left side of the painting, in a yellow-brown rocking chair facing a bay window overlooking brick-red buildings and chimneys; she is seen only from behind. Her head is leaning forward as if reading, sewing, or sleeping, but her hands are not visible. A table covered with red cloth sits behind her.

The room is mostly unadorned, the floor covered with a green carpet. The windows are fringed by three green shades which let the sun in; the shade in the center is open more than the other two, revealing the blue sky above the cityscape. The central focus of the painting is a vase full of pink and white flowers. It sits near a window on a round table with a blue covering. Sunlight streams in and falls on the table and the vase, continuing across the left side of the room with a patch of sunlight falling on the floor. In the lower right corner, the painting is signed "Edward Hopper".

== Background ==
The early 1930s were a productive and successful time for Hopper, full of sales and recognition for his art. Artist and critic Guy Pène du Bois sang Hopper's praises in the literature, commending both Hopper and his colleague Charles E. Burchfield, who were often compared. Hopper had himself previously interviewed Burchfield and published an article about his work. In 1931 alone, Hopper sold 30 paintings. The next year, Hopper and his wife Josephine Nivison ("Jo") moved into a larger, top-floor apartment at 3 Washington Square North in Greenwich Village with a view facing Washington Square Park, and remained there for the rest of their lives.

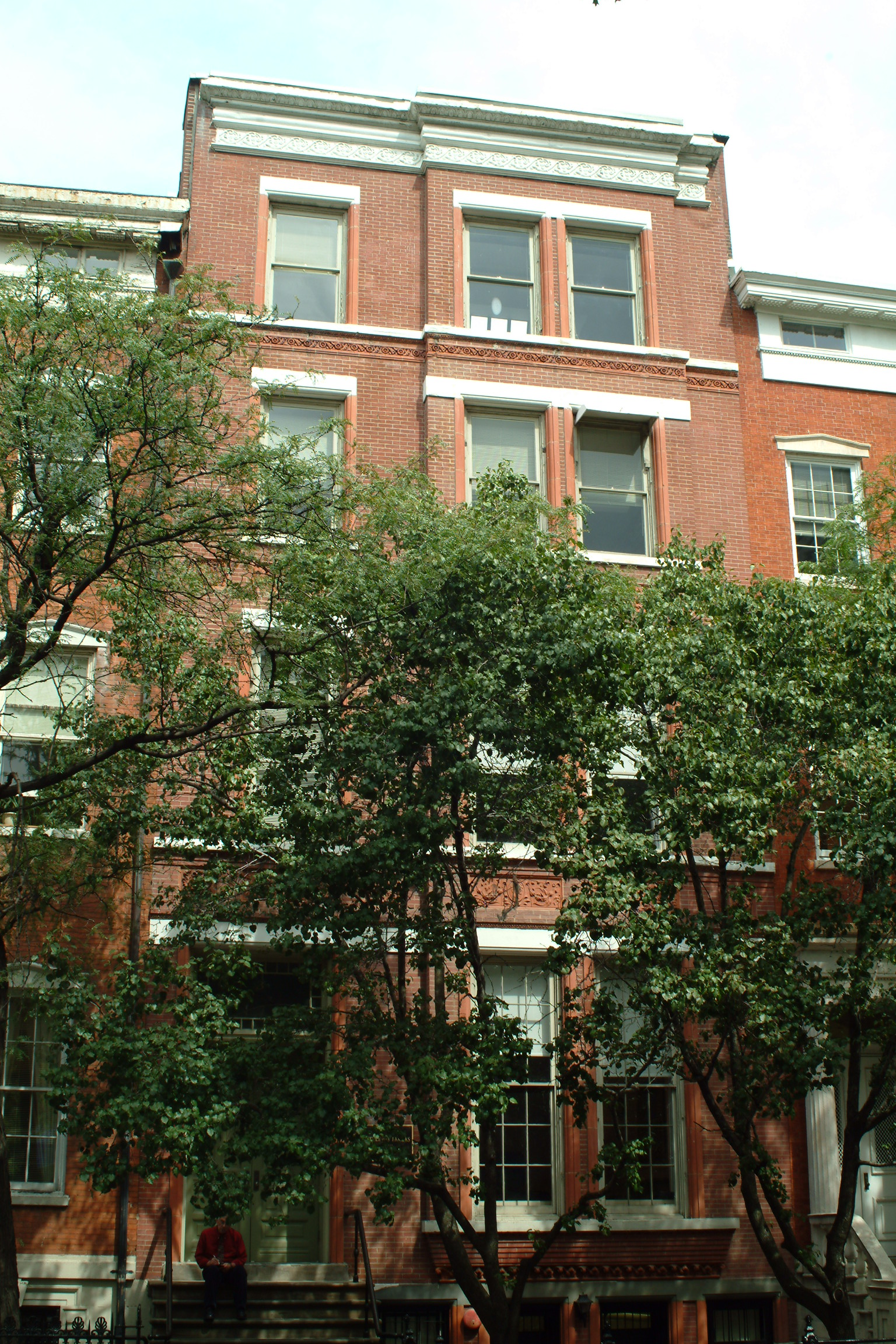
Hopper's New York studio (top floor)

The National Academy of Design announced in March 1932 that they had elected Hopper to their ranks, but Hopper declined their membership. Hopper had long been unhappy by the way he was treated. The Academy, a conservative gatekeeper of new American art, (Note: In a 1927 article for The Arts about painter and etcher John Sloan, Hopper wrote: "We remember the abuse received by all these men from press and public when they were making their fight for recognition of their principles ... Some of these men at times passed the Academy juries, but more often did not ... Official organizations never encourage native art, for mediocrity has much the same flavor the world over ... Of the unnumbered artists of talent and even genius who did not have this technical accomplishment, many must have given up ... These have been lost to American art forever.") had spent many years turning down his submissions. This time of his life, lasting roughly 15 years, was described as one of "disappointment and discouragement". By the early 1920s, Hopper had only sold two paintings, but there was still demand for his etchings, with Hopper producing dozens from 1915 to 1923. When the Academy elected Hopper, The New York Times reported that the organization "considered a stronghold of conservatism, departed from its traditional paths ... by electing ... an artist of the modern school, Edward Hopper."

Jo was instrumental in helping Hopper jump-start his career, though in later years he was reticent to admit it. Previously, in 1923, they painted watercolors together in Gloucester, Massachusetts, becoming romantically involved that summer. Jo exhibited her watercolors in a group show at the Brooklyn Museum, persuading the organizers to let Hopper participate. They accepted, with the critics mostly ignoring her submissions and praising Hopper instead. They married the following year. After his first showing at the Frank K. M. Rehn Gallery in 1924, Hopper was able to quit commercial art and devote himself to fine art full-time.

Museums first began acquiring his work in 1925 with Apartment Houses (1923) entering the collection of the Pennsylvania Academy of the Fine Arts. The Museum of Modern Art (MoMA) added House by the Railroad (1925) in 1930. Room in New York appeared at the first Whitney Biennial in the fall of 1932. The MoMA hosted Hopper's first retrospective exhibition in 1933.

== Development ==
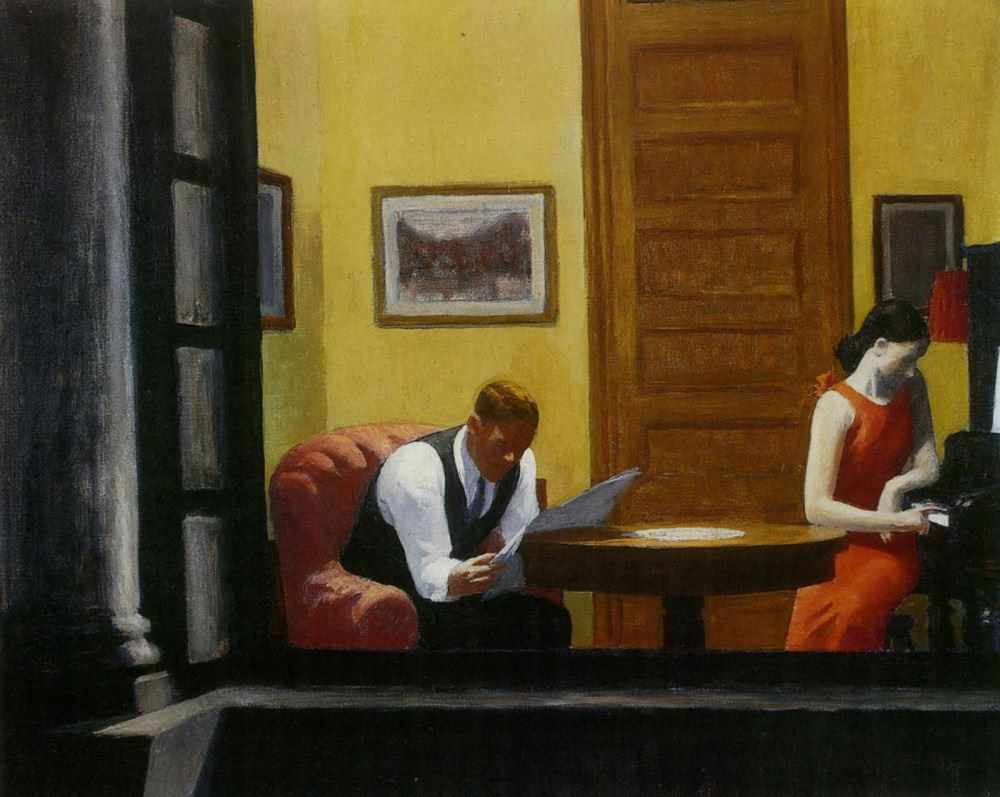
Room in New York (1932)

Hopper started painting Room in Brooklyn at the beginning of 1932. It was improvised, although Jo's story behind the work is disputed by curator Carol Troyen. Jo said Hopper had planned to paint the Brooklyn Bridge outside the window, but when it came time, he discovered it would not work. Hopper was worried about "clutter", recalls Jo, forcing him to eliminate the bridge idea. Jo said that it was entirely unclear if any remnants of Brooklyn remained in the final painting once Hopper decided not to paint the bridge. Troyen is skeptical of this explanation, since there was little room in the painting to accommodate a bridge.

Hopper completed the painting in February along with its possible pendant, Room in New York. The latter painting depicts a couple sitting in the same room, distant from each other. The man is seen reading a newspaper while the woman sits across from him with a bored look, about to strike a key on a piano.

== Style ==
Alfred H. Barr Jr., the first director of the Museum of Modern Art, described the painting, along with Hotel Room (1931), as sharing precise, well-defined forms ("the whetting of edges") and vivid color that created a formal intensity ("approaching harshness"). Critics have described Hopper as a modern realist painter, portraying realism in his subject matter while expressing modernism in his formal compositions. Troyen argues that Barr initially presented Hopper as a modernist for political reasons in an attempt to appeal to factions seeking both contemporary and more radically modernist works for the museum's collection. In the same catalog, however, Hopper dismissed abstract art as merely decorative. Troyen maintains that Hopper's modernist style at this time more closely resembled the late-19th-century work of Paul Cézanne and the Precisionism of Charles Sheeler.

=== Caspar David Friedrich ===
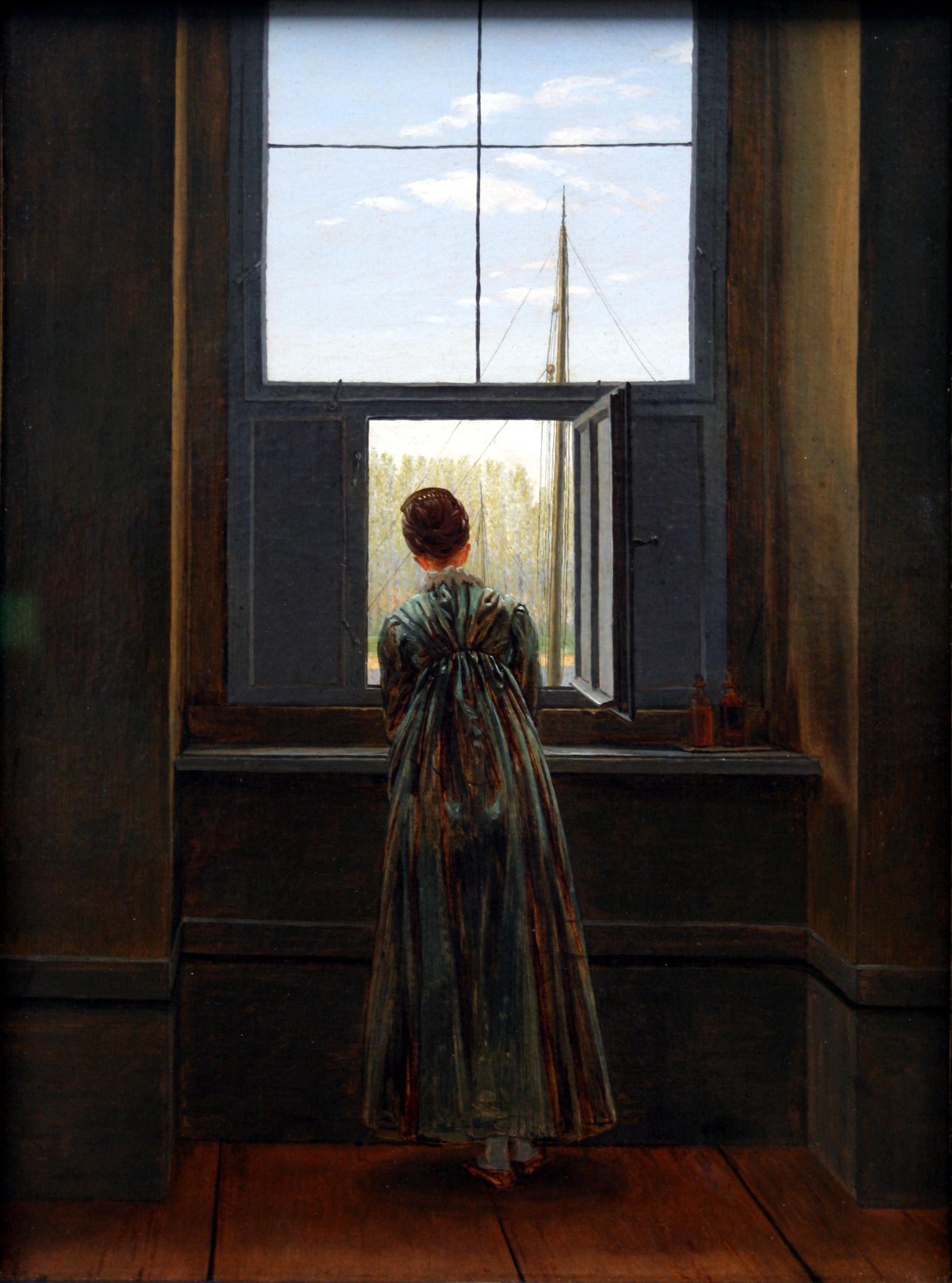
Woman at a Window (1822), by Caspar David Friedrich (Note: Friedrich's wife Caroline portrays the Woman at a Window. The view depicted in the painting is the view from his studio above the Elbe river in Dresden. It is the only known interior painting by Friedrich.)

The painting is suggestive of the style of several different artists. Many art historians have noted the influence of the style of Caspar David Friedrich on Hopper's work. Friedrich, a 19th-century German Romantic painter, was known for his use of the Rückenfigur, a motif showing a solitary figure seen only from behind who gazes out at a landscape. David Anfam believed that Hopper was aware of Friedrich. "Hopper's taste for German culture", writes Anfam, "may have alerted him more than most to the then-obscure Friedrich." Hopper had studied the German language, made use of German motifs in his early work, and displayed knowledge of the German art tradition.

Hopper traveled to Europe three times. In his first trip, he spent ten months in Europe from the fall of 1906 until the summer of 1907. He visited Paris, London, Amsterdam, Berlin, and Brussels. Hopper was in Berlin in July, spending less than a week in the city. This was at a time when the German public had just rediscovered Friedrich, whose work was shown in the Exhibition of German Art of the Century one year earlier. Scholar Margaret Iversen compares Room in Brooklyn with Friedrich's Woman at a Window (1822).

=== John Sloan ===
John Sloan was influential in Hopper's life from around the time of World War I until the early 1920s. Hopper wrote positively about Sloan in 1927, anticipating his own embrace of many of Sloan's themes. According to art historian Robert Hobbs, Sloan was known for portraying everyday people engaged in solitary activities within buildings, in eating establishments and theaters, and in seascapes and scenes from modern city life. While Hopper draws from much of Sloan's work, and they were both realists associated with the Ashcan School, a term they mutually disliked and disavowed, they were also very different people.

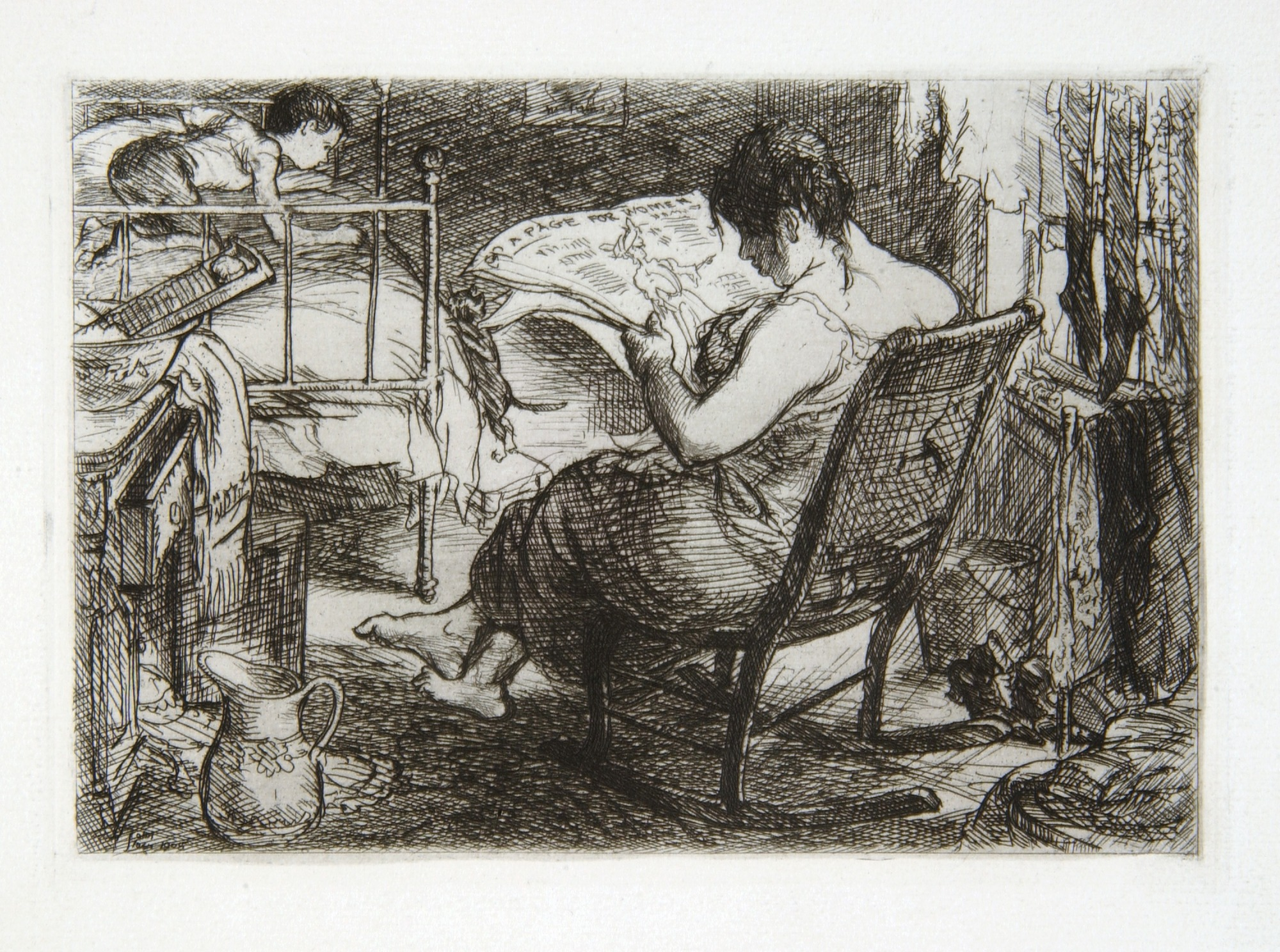
The Women's Page (1905), by John Sloan

Echoes of Sloan's etchings and paintings can be found in several of Hopper's works during this time. His etching of Evening Wind (1921) evokes Sloan's Turning Out the Light (1905), while Room in Brooklyn is reminiscent of Sloan's The Women's Page (1905), notably as a source for the figure of the woman in the chair. Hobbs argues that the woman in the chair is similar to the popular image of women sewing from 18th- and 19th-century art, except Hopper turned the image away from the viewer. For Hobbs, Hopper "makes her anonymous as the mass of undifferentiated Brooklyn tenements outside the window".

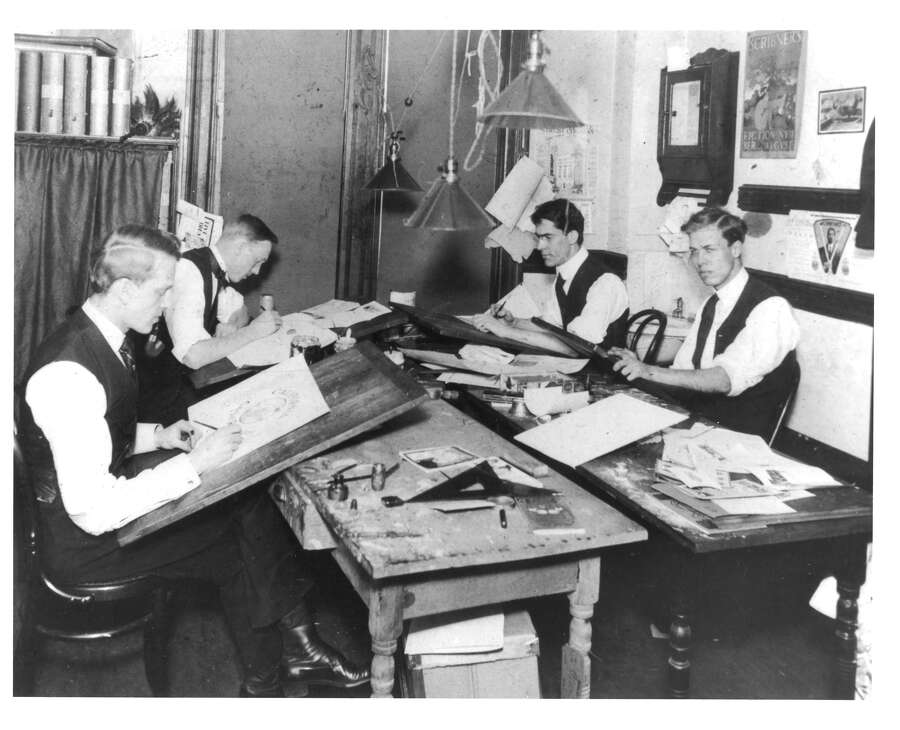
Hopper (front, right) at the C. C. Phillips Agency (c. 1906)

In works such as A Window on the Street (1912), Sloan drew on the Pre-Raphaelites and earlier Renaissance traditions, focusing on women in interiors. Hopper stripped this tradition bare, favoring a stark modern realism of urban spaces and unidentified people in apartments. These differences extended to their personal lives: Sloan supported left-wing causes and workers' rights in illustrations for socialist newspapers, while Hopper made his living as a commercial illustrator.

Although his commercial work promoted business interests, he also undermined (Note: Hopper also minimized the importance of his commercial work during his lifetime, believing it diminished the importance of his fine art. After his death, art historians praised Hopper's commercial art, recognizing it as a testing ground for the visual narratives and designs that would appear in his later, more successful paintings. Levin first made this connection while working on Hopper's catalogue raisonné at the time of the show for Edward Hopper: Prints and Illustrations (1979), with curator Kim Conaty developing the idea further in the exhibition Edward Hopper's New York (2022).) similar ideas in his fine art. Hopper avoided expressing political positions (Note: Biographers like Levin have documented Edward and Jo's "passionate antagonism to Roosevelt and the New Deal". Hopper believed that government funding for the arts, for example, would lead to second-rate work. Troyen also speculates that one major reason Hopper strenuously objected to being labeled as an American Scene painter was because many of those artists were supported by New Deal government art programs. Levin refers to Hopper as a "staunch conservative". Even a conservative like Hopper was a victim of Cold War, anticommunist paranoia. His painting Conference at Night (1949) was returned by Stephen Clark because Clark's wife thought it resembled a "Communist gathering".) in his own work. Regarding the etching East Side Interior (1922), he told a curator in 1956, "No implication was intended with any ideology concerning the poor and oppressed. The interior itself was my main interest—simply a piece of New York, the city that interests me so much."

== Themes ==
Art historian Theodore Stebbins once described the painting as a "lonely urban scene". Scholar Paweł Marcinkiewicz explores the origin of this idea by taking an urban cultural and literary studies approach to the painting. He follows up on the previous work of Hana Wirth-Nesher (1996) and Richard Lehan (1998) and places the painting in the historical context of the cityscape in art, arguing that Room in Brooklyn inherited an earlier style that arose in the 19th century. This style is only one of many, however, with Wirth-Nesher contrasting Hopper's style with Manet's The Balcony (1868), which portrays the same idea from a different perspective.

Marcinkiewicz shows that Hopper's style and depiction of isolation comes out of both the changing design of cities, such as Haussmann's renovation of Paris, and new ideas that arose at the same time about the nature of the crowd. In the example of Paris, the redevelopment diminished and in some cases eliminated the older communal and ethical values, dividing communities (Note: Lehan points to the work of Émile Zola who incorporated these ideas into his novels, believing that "modern man had been displaced from the natural environment". Later, over time, the city in general was perceived as "more chaotic, less friendly and more hostile", writes Lehan, and "the inhabitants become more alienated, more lonely and isolated".) in the service of more efficient transportation.

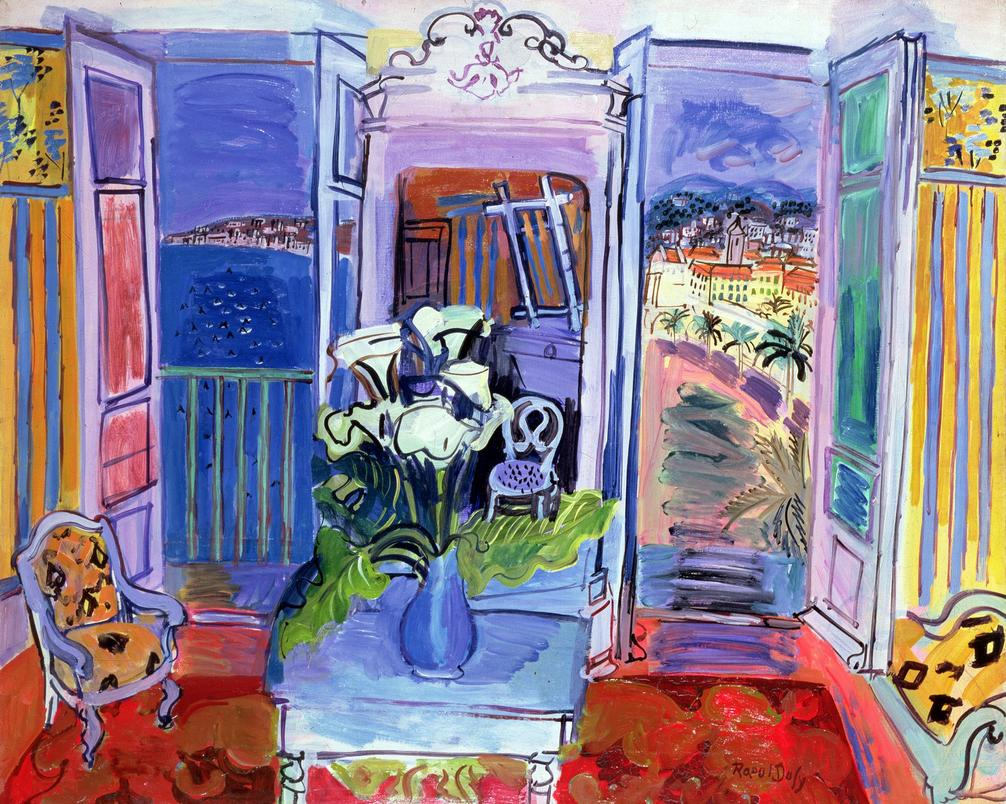
Interior at the Open Window (1928), by Raoul Dufy

These changes, argues Marcinkiewicz, led to the increasing isolation of the individual from the crowd, with the crowd taking on a new association with the city itself. According to Lehan, these ideas were expressed in the work of George Simmel, Max Weber, and Walter Benjamin. "What gets lost in mass society", writes Marcinkiewicz, "is the individual, who feels alienated from the crowd". He argues that this notion influenced art, with paintings like Paris Street; Rainy Day (1877) depicting a new kind of isolated figure in the city for the first time, eventually growing into a dominant theme by the early 20th century in works by Frits Van den Berghe, Giorgio de Chirico, and Raoul Dufy.

Dufy's work in particular shows what Marcinkiewicz calls an "extension of human solitude". In the painting Interior With Open Window (1928), Dufy presents an empty room with windows looking out on to the city, with a chair and a vase of flowers. Marcinkiewicz believes Hopper draws upon this same, new way of seeing the city in Room in Brooklyn. Levin notes that Jo's "few surviving works suggest her affinity with fauvist color and the paintings of Raoul Dufy." Hopper himself compared Jo's watercolors favorably with Dufy's.

Other art historians like Louis Shadwick believe the painting moves beyond the usual Hopperian clichés of loneliness and alienation, suggesting that a more multilayered perspective and interpretation is possible. Shadwick writes that the richly colored palette and the figure framed in sunlight suggest something more subtle and nuanced. According to Art historian Gail Levin, Hopper's etchings refined and cultivated his depiction of the solitary female figure in urban interior spaces. Evening Wind (1921) marks Hopper's first nude in this theme to be fully realized with technical proficiency, with East Side Interior (1922) and paintings like Moonlight Interior (1921–1923) and Eleven A.M. (1926) continuing to focus on this subject. Levin argues that Room in Brooklyn is compositionally reminiscent of Hopper's older etching of The Bay Window (1915–1918), which features a woman sewing near a window. Like Shadwick, Levin also acknowledges that critics have overstated the loneliness in much of Hopper's work, but finds it to be most true for his etchings, as they were made before his marriage to Jo.

Hopper preferred to depict scenes in rooms looking out through a window in daylight, but there are exceptions where he used night instead. Troyen notes that Room in Brooklyn is part of Hopper's long-running exploration of figures in sunlit rooms, a theme beginning with Summer Interior (1909) and culminating decades later in Sun in an Empty Room (1963), by which time the figure has been removed entirely.

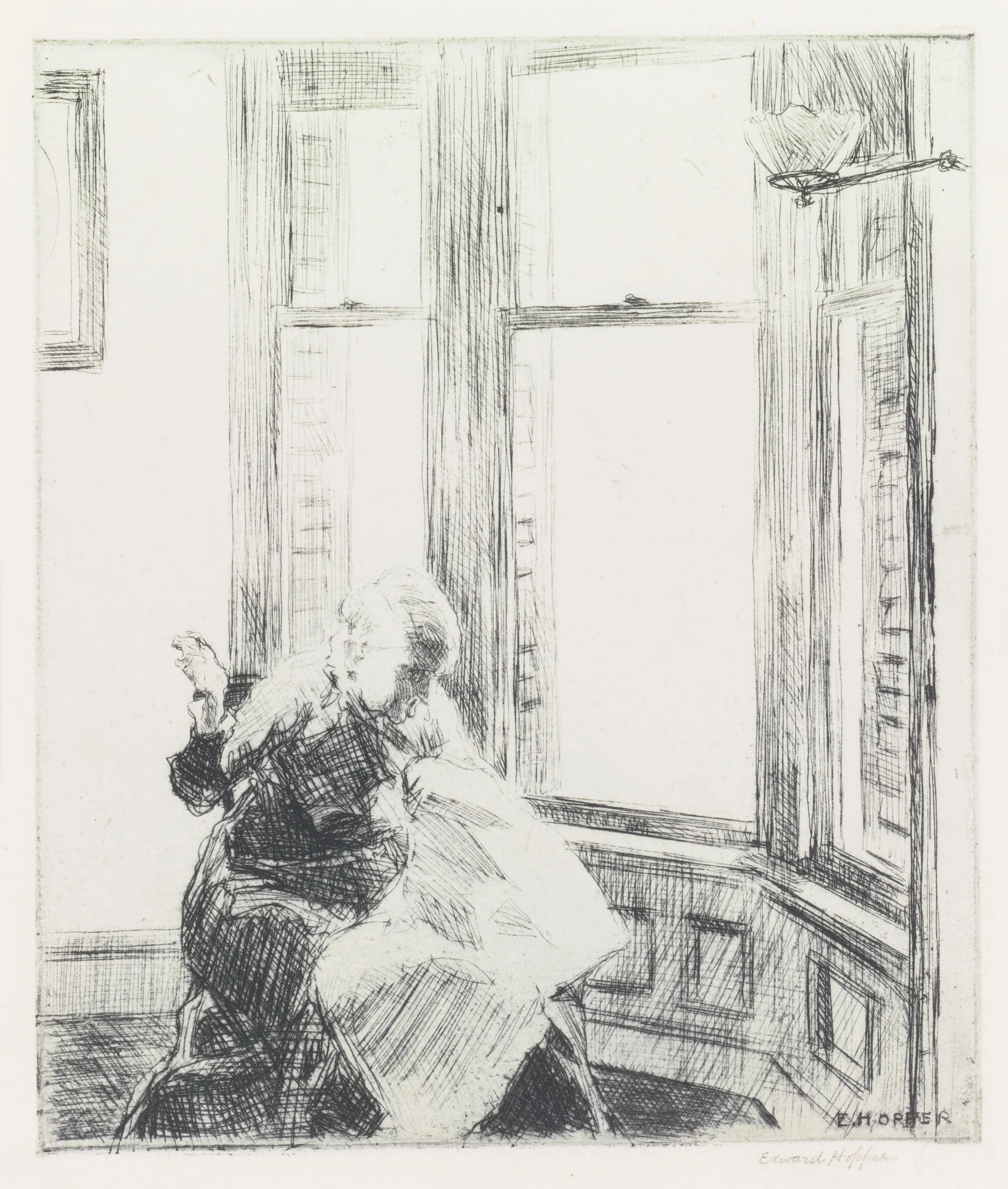
The Bay Window (1915–1918)

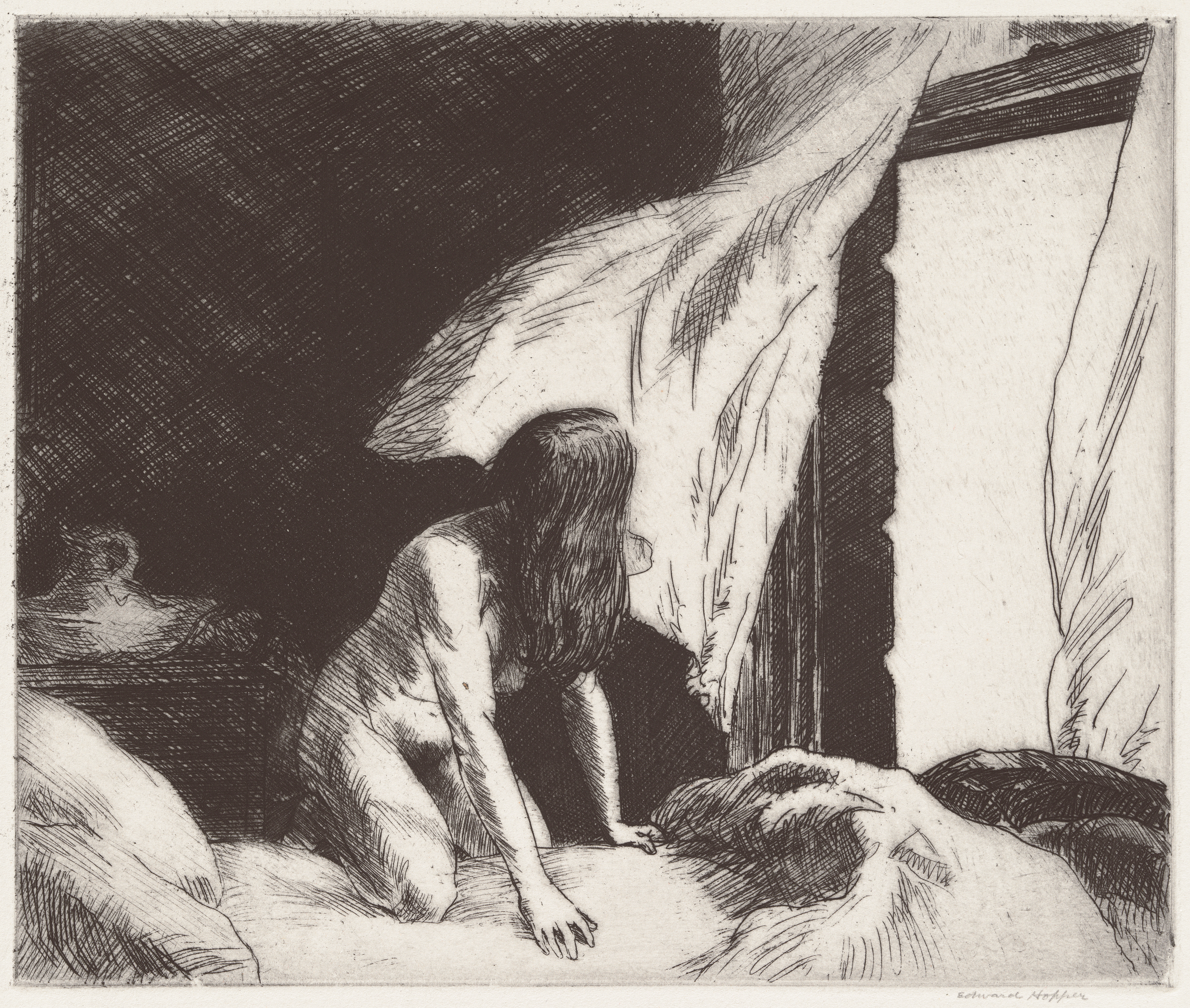
Evening Wind (1921)

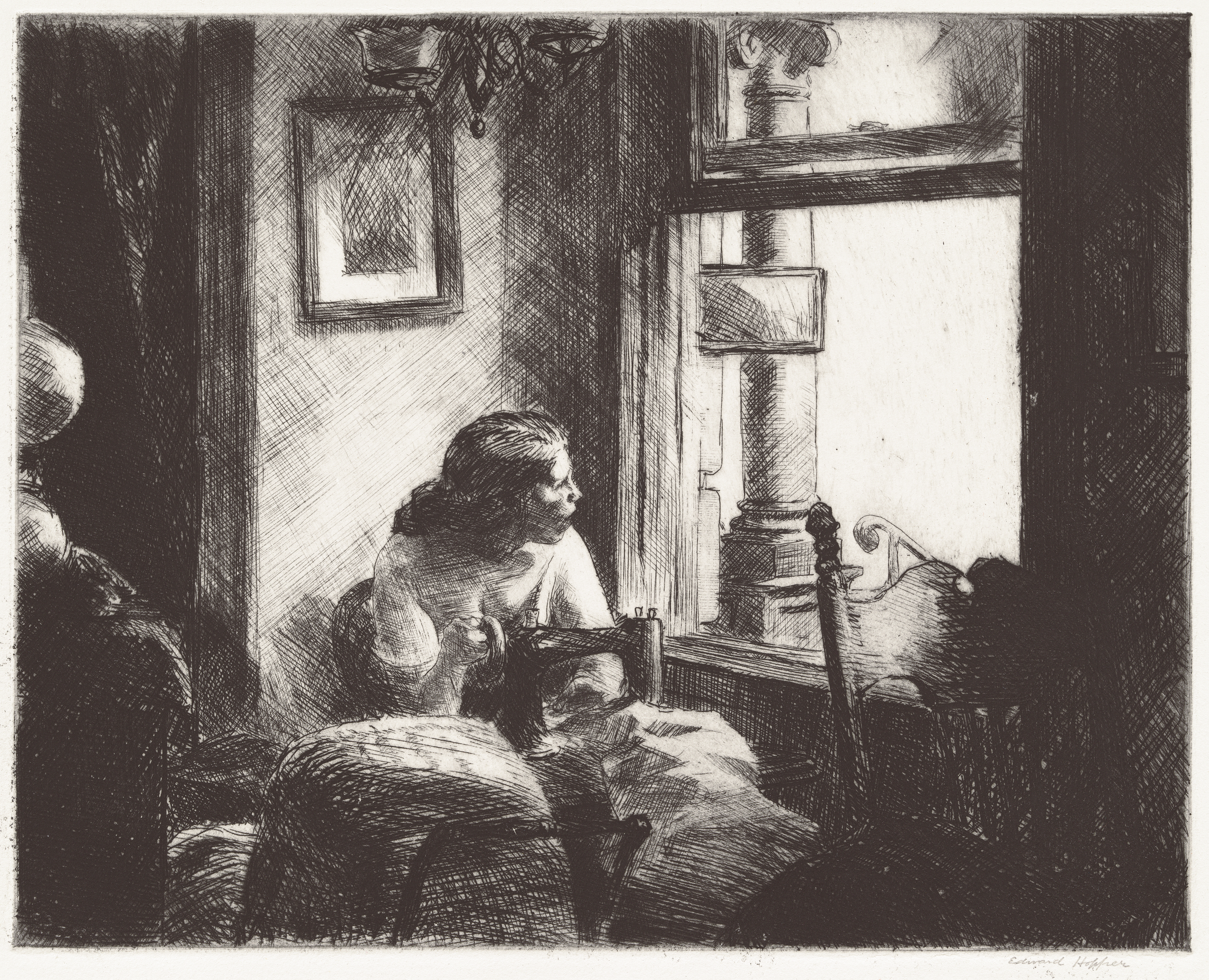
East Side Interior (1922)

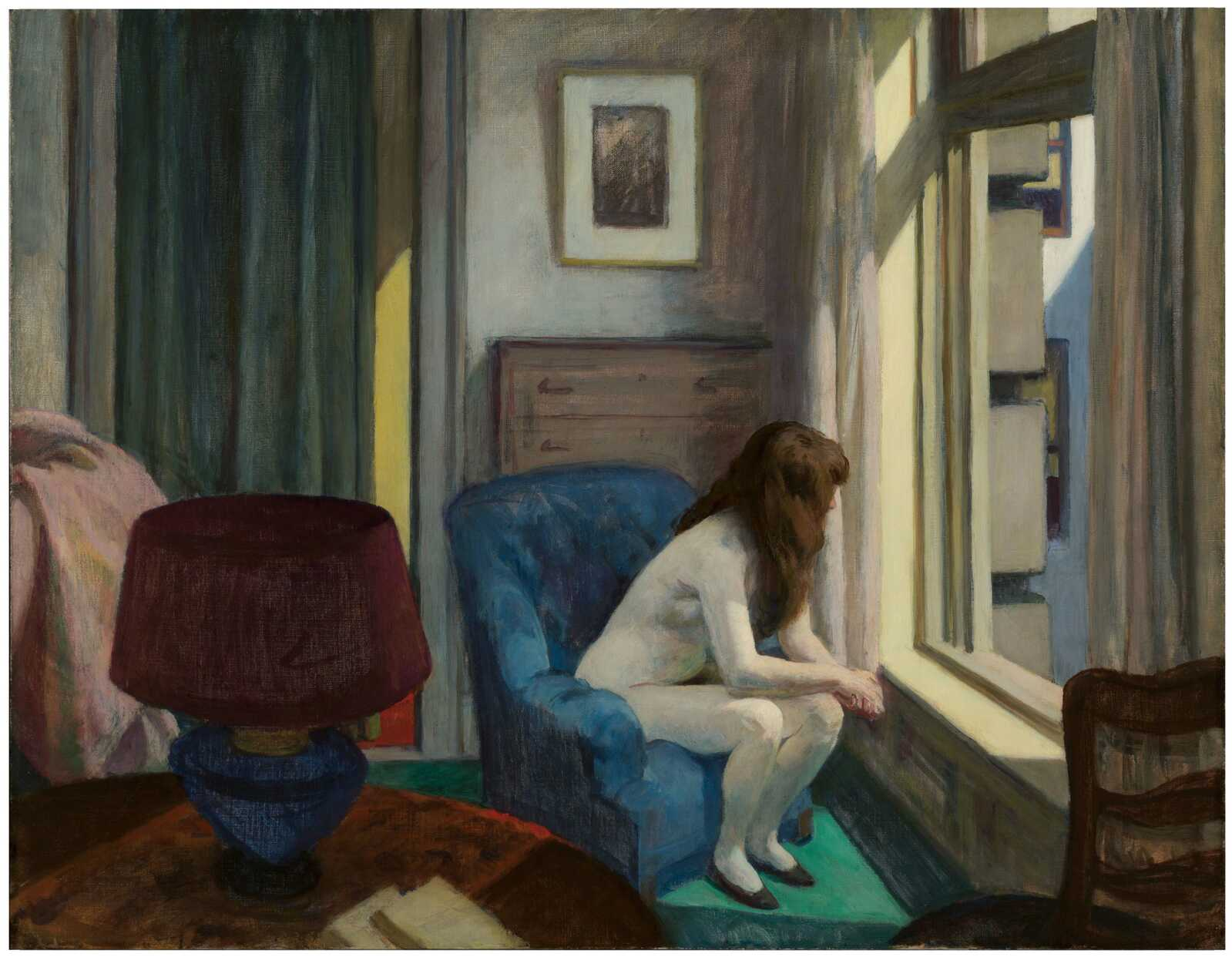
Eleven A.M. (1926)

== Setting ==
The row houses in Room in Brooklyn resemble urban architecture in Hopper's other New York works produced in the five years before the painting, including The City (1927), From Williamsburg Bridge (1928), and Early Sunday Morning (1930), the latter loosely depicting structures once found on Seventh Avenue. Many of the buildings Hopper depicts in his New York paintings no longer exist, having since been demolished and replaced by newer structures. Hopper's paintings of New York, as Shadwick observes, document significant changes in the city's historical development. In response to the city's transformation, Hopper and his wife campaigned to preserve the older architecture in their Greenwich Village neighborhood throughout their lives.

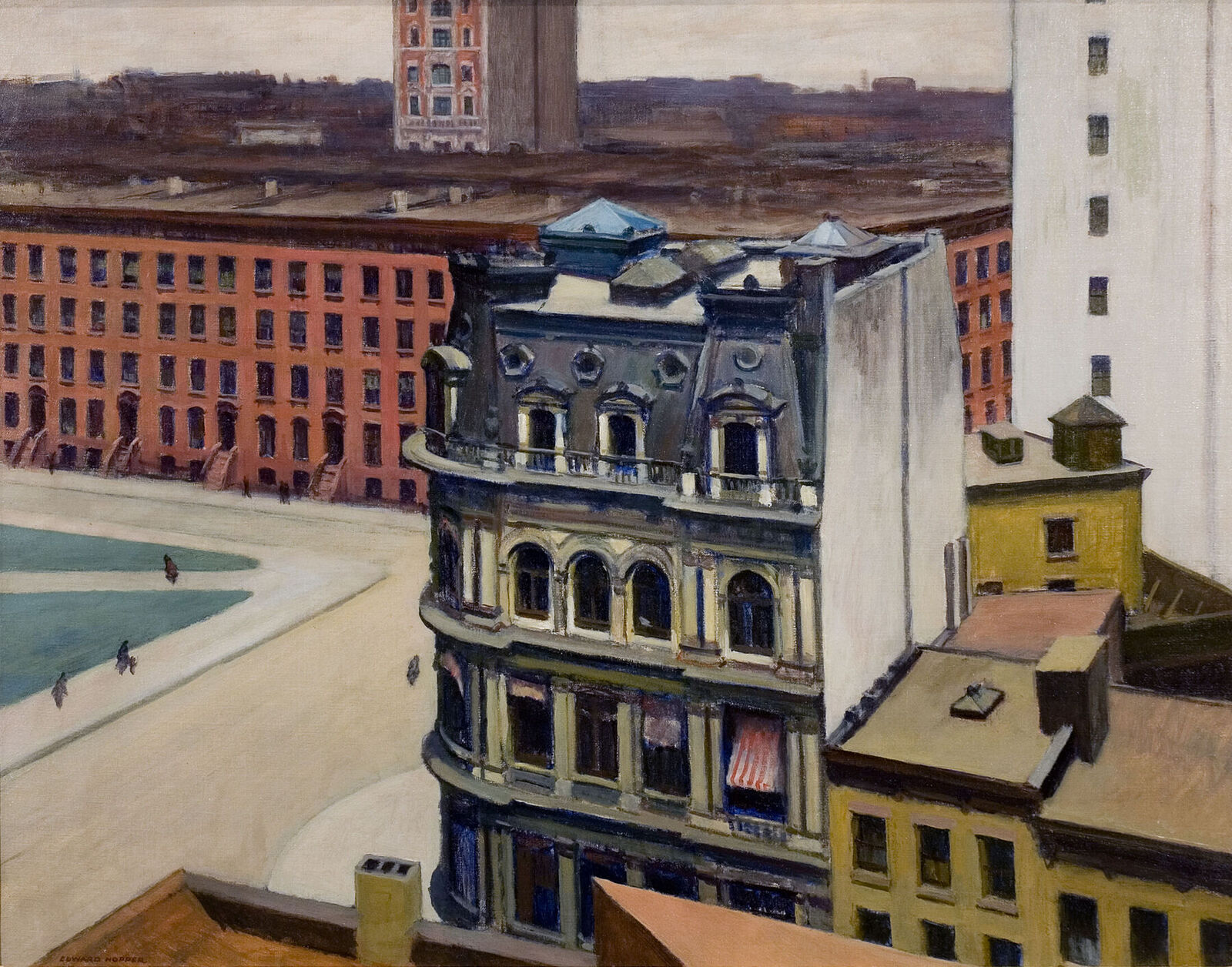
The City (1927)

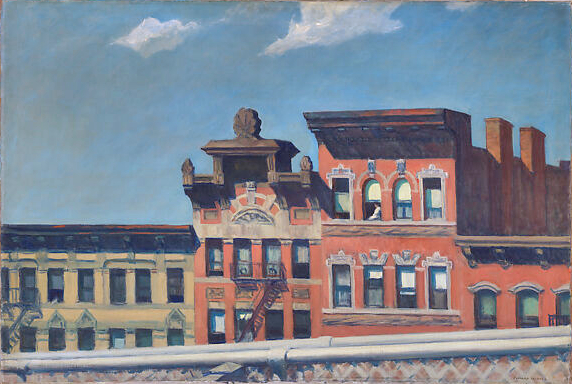
From Williamsburg Bridge (1928)

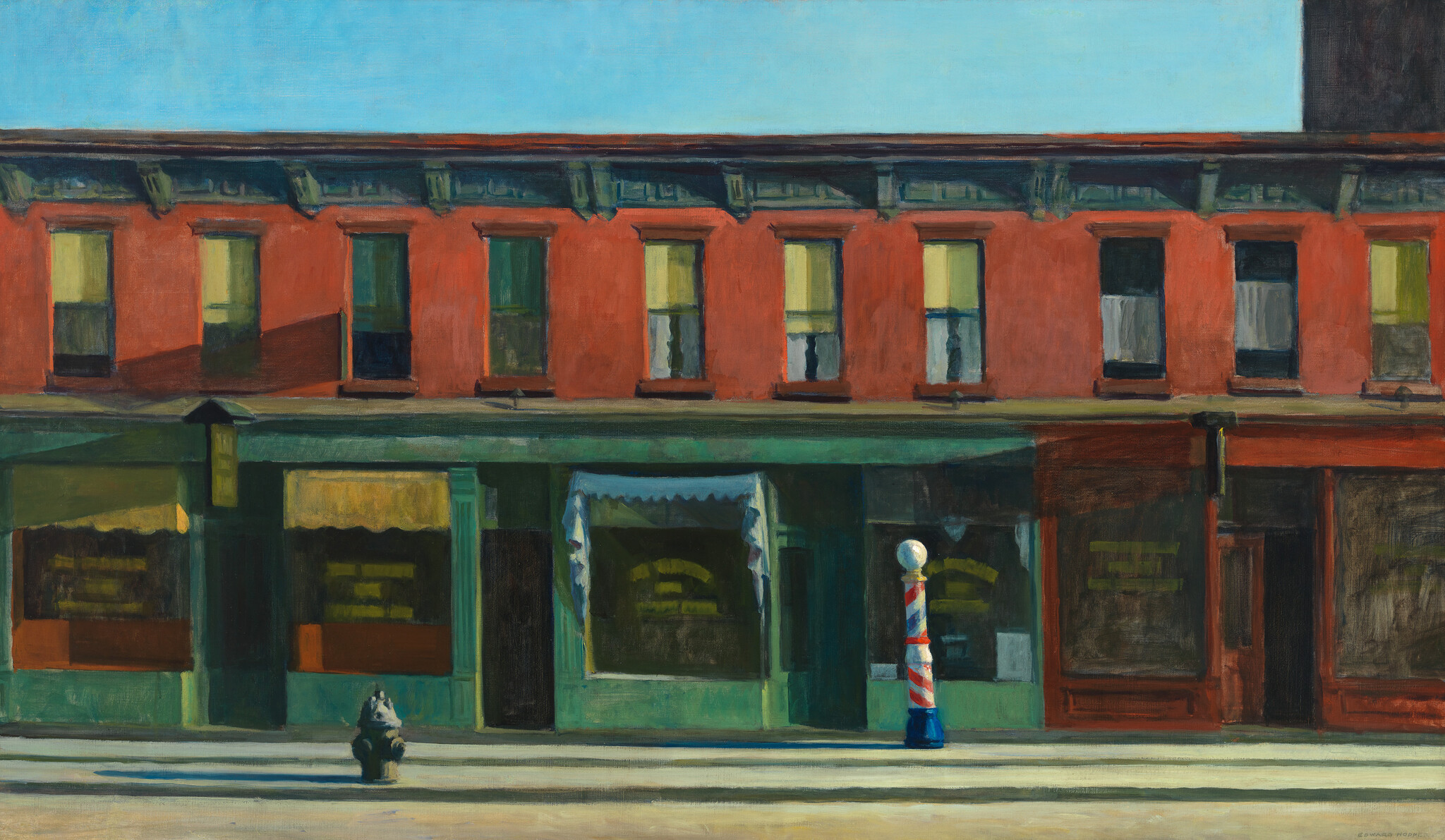
Early Sunday Morning (1930)

== Flowers ==
At his Cape Cod summer home and studio in South Truro, Massachusetts, Hopper told art critic Brian O'Doherty in 1963 that Room in Brooklyn was the only painting of cut flowers in his entire catalog. "I don't care very much for flowers", he recalled. "In all the work I've done there's only one painting with flowers, Room in Brooklyn, a little vase on the table with flowers ... the so-called beauty is all there. You can't add anything to them of your own—yourself ... the unsophisticated think there's something inherent in it .... A pond with lilies or something. There isn't of course." While Room in Brooklyn is the only painting (Note: "The only painting" generally refers to Hopper's mature style where flowers feature as a major compositional element, such as a flower arrangement seen in the depiction of a vase of flowers. In his other uses of flowers earlier in his career, they appear small, in the background, and barely noticeable.) by Hopper to depict flowers, he had featured flowers in the background of his outdoor paintings earlier in his career, including in Railroad Train (1908), painted in an Impressionist-influenced style following his recent trip to Paris, and in Rocks and Houses, Ogunquit (1914), completed during his time on the coast of Maine.

External image
- Edward and Jo Hopper, 1933. Photograph by Louise Dahl-Wolfe. Whitney Museum of American Art.

Unlike Hopper, Jo was fond of depicting flowers in her work. (Note: Colleary provides a sample of titles from Jo's work depicting flowers: Petunia's Cape, Dad Stephen's in Wash Basin, Irene Slater's Flowers in Red Glass, Marigolds and Cosmos from Slade Garden, Dad Stephen's Madonna Lilies, Prayer Full Zinnias, From Marie Stephens Garden (big blue hydrangea, red gladiolas, red zinnias, blue bells), and Petunias from Warren Garden. One playful title reads Buick Warren Garden, indicating she was painting while in the car. Many of the titles are named after the gardeners who cultivated the flowers.) She painted still-life watercolors of vases of flowers and, separately, fruit baskets, which she featured in exhibitions and successfully sold. Jo had a preference for flowers in her home, whether in New York or Cape Cod. Painter Raphael Soyer, who knew the Hoppers, recalled visiting them in Greenwich Village in 1955 and seeing Jo's paintings of flowers displayed in her studio.

In an interview, Jo explained she resisted painting flowers in the beginning as she thought that was what women were supposed to paint, but a closer look changed her mind: " ...one day when at a loss for subject matter my skirt brushed against some lovely petunias, zinnias—most arresting creatures, really ...they were so enchanting, I marveled at the exquisite tilt of the petals and the gesture of the long stems, so friendly, living their tossed lives in the teeth of east winds and ocean spray .... I felt they should be painted."

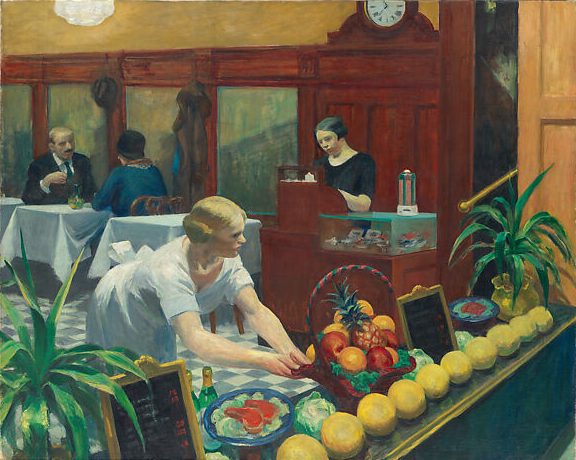
Tables for Ladies (1930)

Art historian Elizabeth Thompson Colleary proposes that both Hopper and Jo shared the same subject matter in this regard, with fruit baskets in her watercolors like Green and White Fruit Basket (1930) also showing up in Hopper's Tables for Ladies (1930). Hopper's use of the flower vase in Room with Brooklyn likely has the same origin, with Colleary describing the flower vase in Hopper's painting as one of Jo's "still-life subjects". Jo's use of fruit baskets and flower bouquets held great personal meaning for her, as they were often gifts which they had received from friends. The fruit basket in Tables for Ladies, for example, was given to them by their friend Bee Blanchard.

Hopper spent years denigrating the painting of flowers as a subject fit only for "lady painters". Levin argues that Hopper did not just scorn his wife's art, but also expressed an overt kind of sexism: "Hopper envisioned no creative role for women, including his wife", writes Levin. "His attitude toward women typifies most male artists of his generation. He was consistent in his disparagement of women artists in general, viewing them mainly as dilettantes who painted flowers, dabbled in other trivial subjects, and caused trouble for men in the profession."

== Provenance ==
Hopper consigned the painting to his art dealer, Frank K. M. Rehn, in February 1932. It was exhibited at least five times before the Museum of Fine Arts, Boston, bought the painting in May 1935 for $1,800 ($42,269 in 2025), under the direction of its third curator, George H. Edgell, who had an interest in modern art. The purchase was supported by the Charles Henry Hayden Fund (Note: The Charles Henry Hayden Fund was established as a $100,000 ($3.87 million in 2025) bequest after the death of wallpaper manufacturer Charles H. Hayden in August 1901. According to The Boston Globe, "This sum is to be spent in the purchase of modern paintings by American artists and the collection is to bear the name 'Hayden Collection'.") (Hayden Collection).

== Selected exhibitions ==
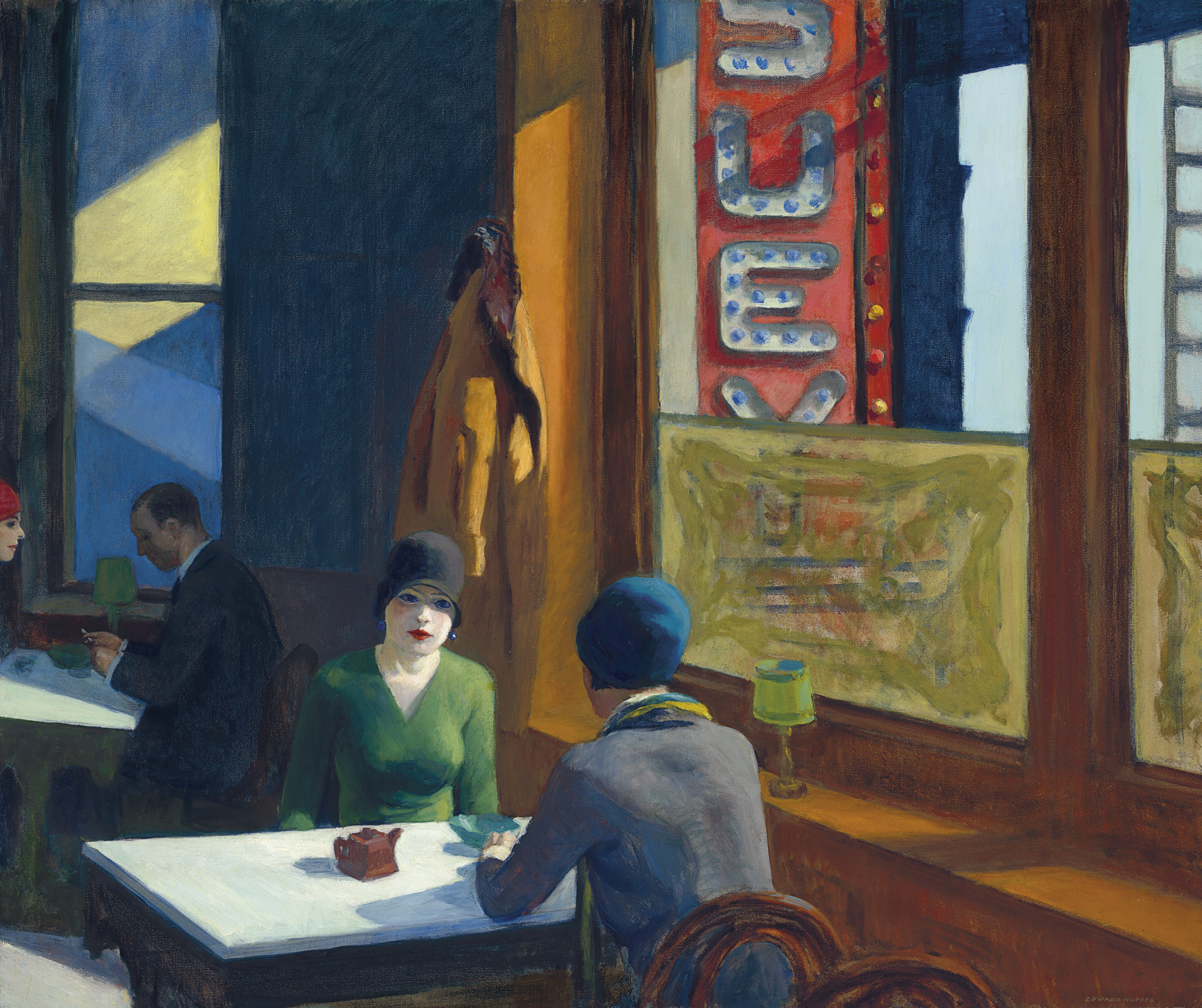
Chop Suey (1929)

The painting was originally exhibited shortly after it was completed, first appearing alongside Hopper's earlier work Chop Suey (1929) at the Modern American Paintings exhibition at the Department of Fine Arts, Carnegie Institute, from April 28 to May 30, 1932.

- Modern American Paintings (Carnegie Institute, 1932)
- Edward Hopper: Retrospective Exhibition (MoMA, 1933)
- Hopper (Arts Club of Chicago, 1934)
- 41st American Annual (Cincinnati Art Museum, 1934)
- Twenty-First Annual (Toledo Museum, 1934)
- Hopper (Carnegie Institute, 1937)
- 54th American Annual (Chicago Art Institute, 1943)
- Hopper (Whitney Museum of American Art, 1950)
- 26th Venice Biennale (1952)
- Edward Hopper: Retrospective Exhibition (Whitney Museum of American Art, 1964)
- Edward Hopper (MFA Boston, 2007)
- Edward Hopper's New York (Whitney Museum of American Art, 2022)

Edward Hopper's New York (2022), an exhibition curated by Kim Conaty, showed 200 works by Hopper divided by theme. Room in Brooklyn was exhibited in a group of paintings categorized as "The Window" in the following set: New York Interior (1921), New York Restaurant (1922), Automat (1927), Drug Store (not pictured, 1927), Night Windows (1928), Tables for Ladies (pictured above, 1930), Room in Brooklyn, (pictured above, 1932), and Room in New York (pictured above, 1932).

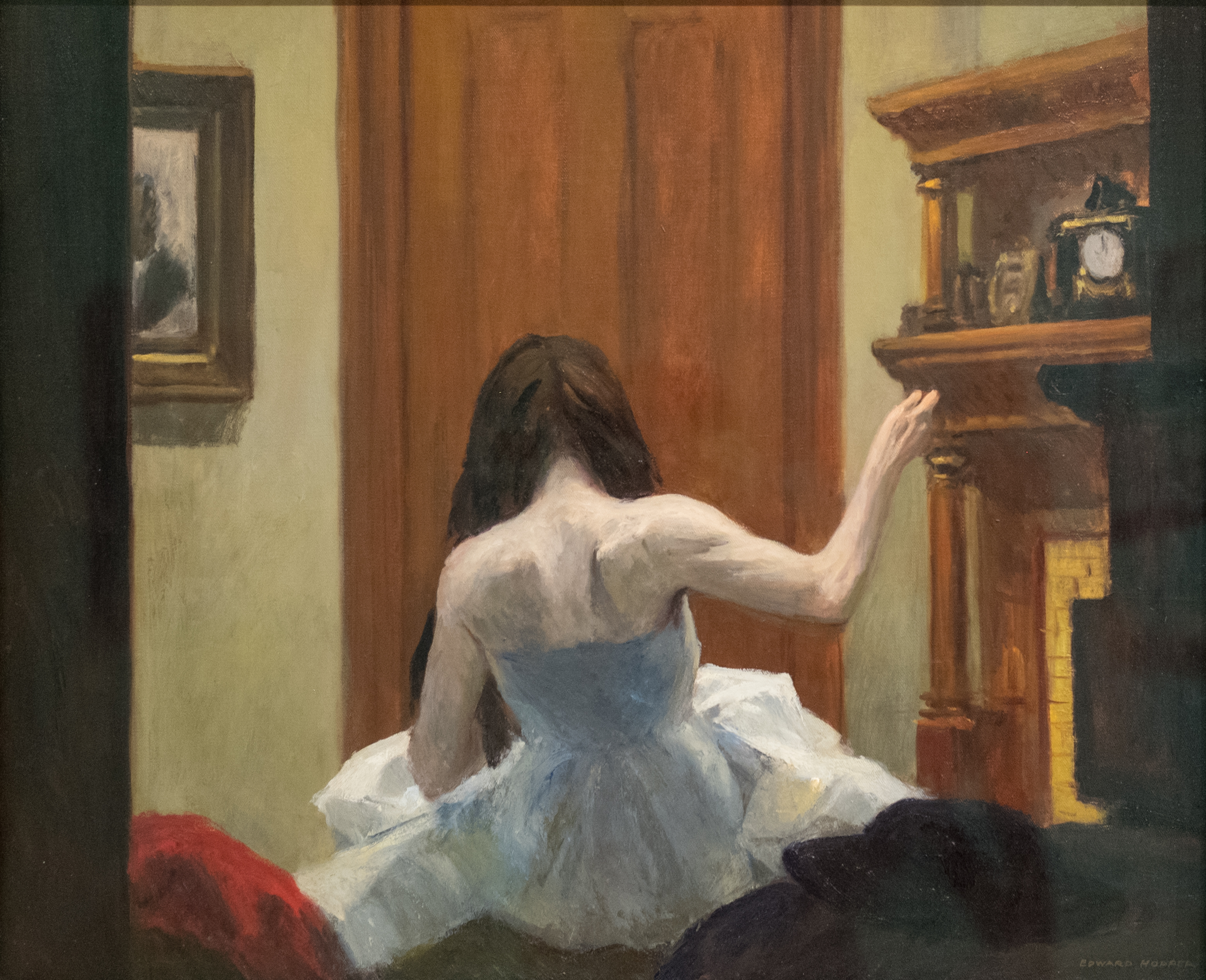
New York Interior (1921)

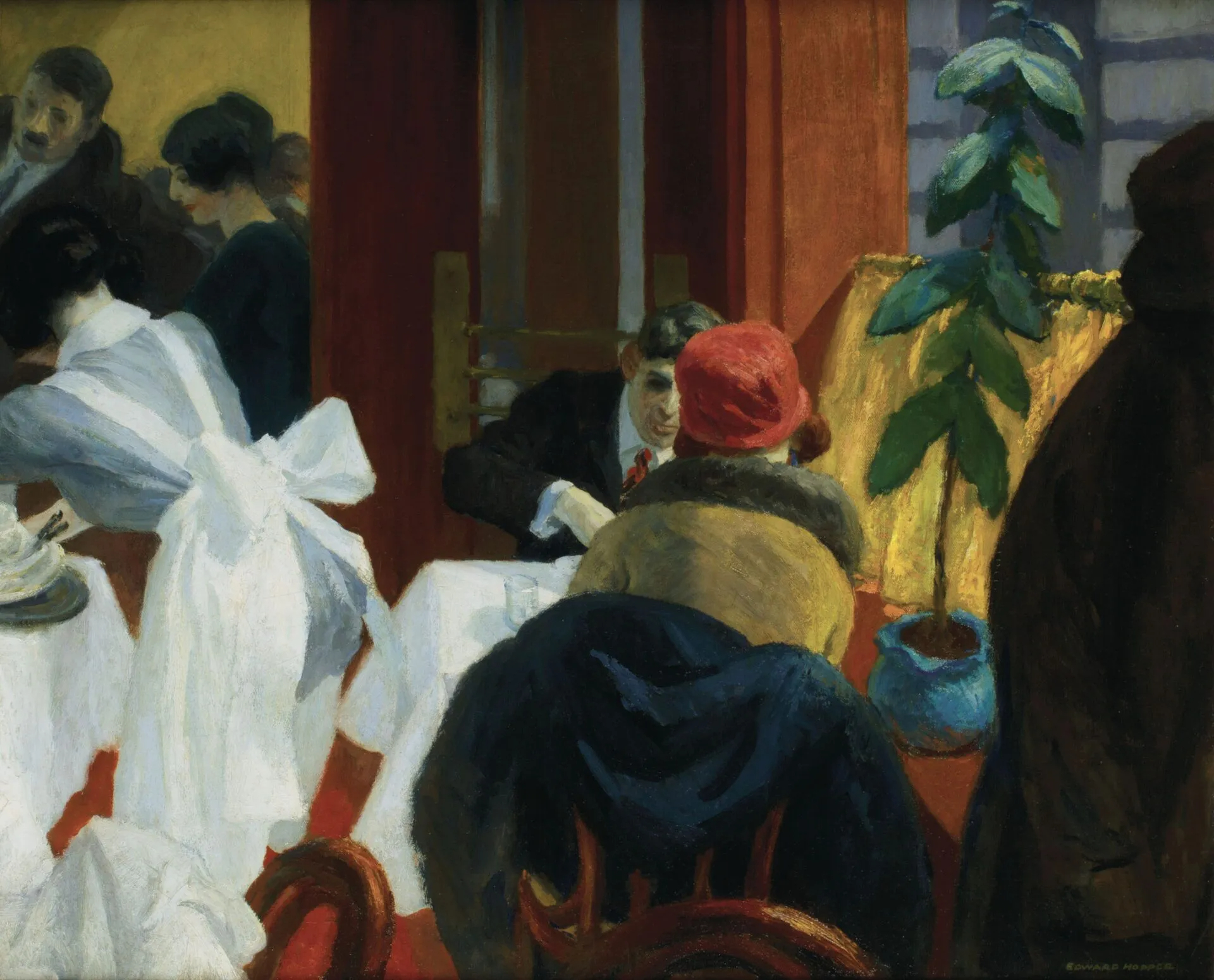
New York Restaurant (1922)

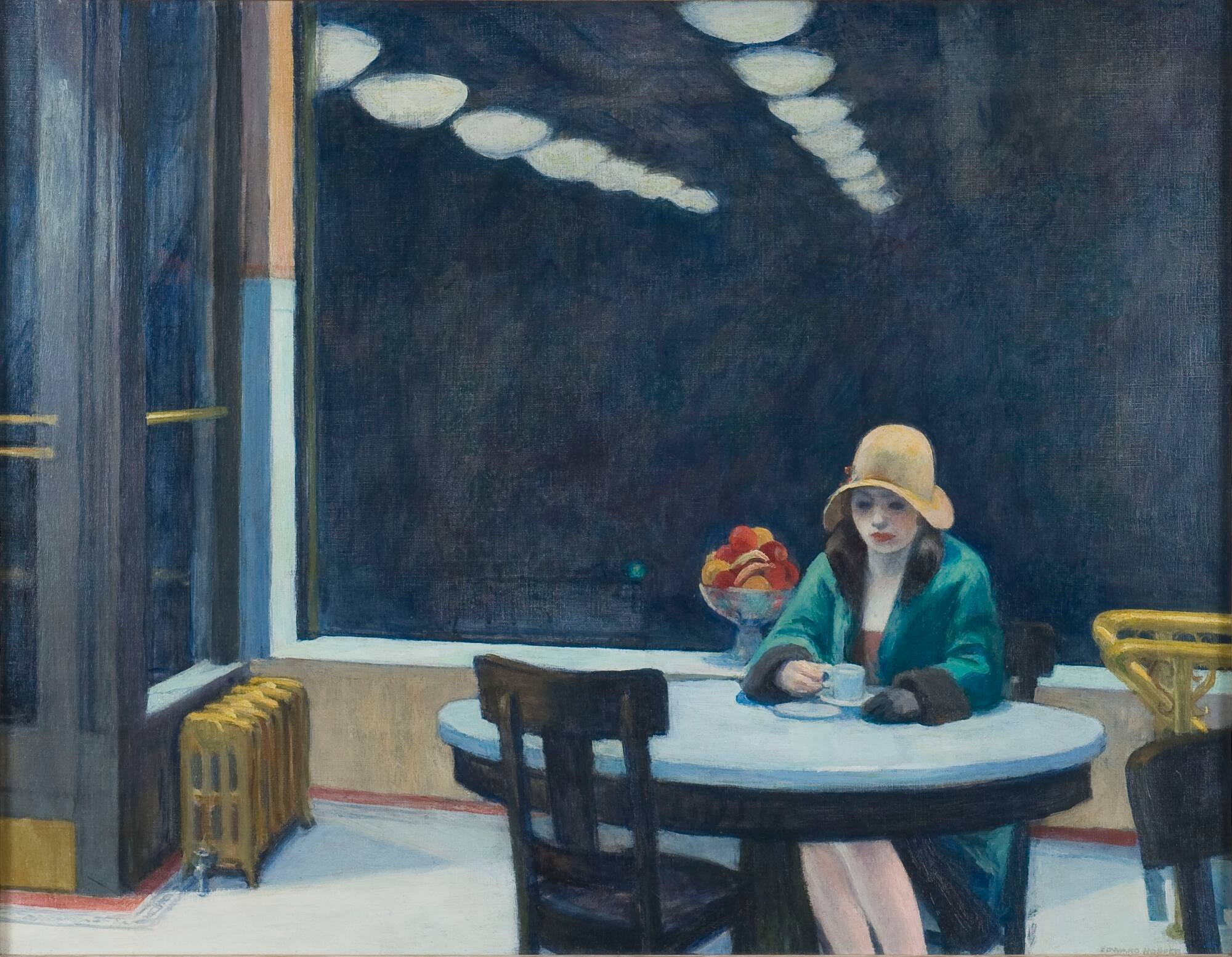
Automat (1927)

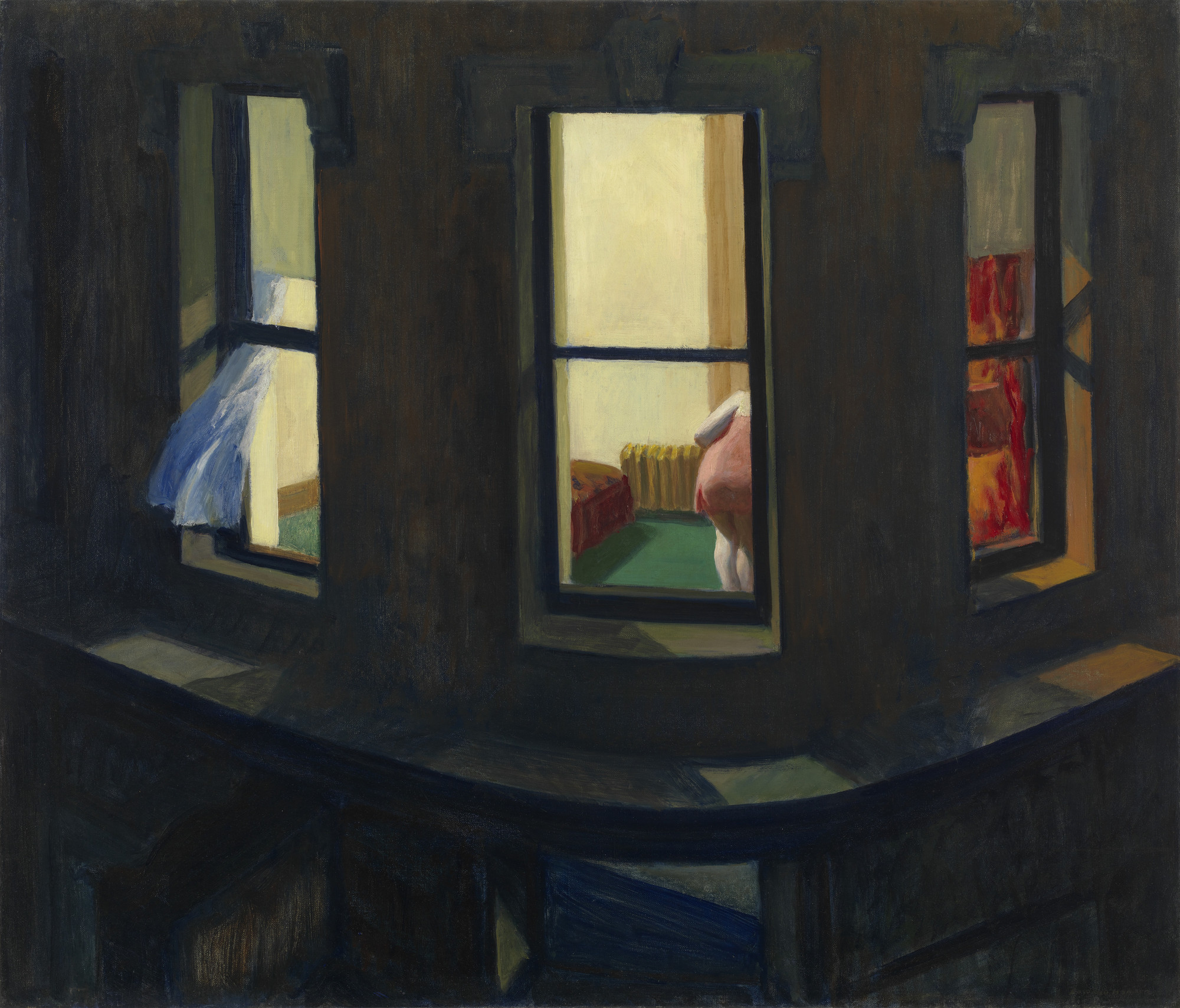
Night Windows (1928)

== See also ==
- List of works by Edward Hopper

== Sources ==
=== Books ===
- Foshay, Ella M. (1990). Art in Bloom. Phaidon Press. ISBN 9780876636039. OCLC 21410776.
- Hobbs, Robert (1987). Edward Hopper. Harry N. Abrams. ISBN 9780810911628. OCLC 15108324.
- Kranzfelder, Ivo (2003). Edward Hopper, 1882–1967: Vision of Reality. Taschen. ISBN 9780760748770. OCLC 1244740183.
- Lehan, Richard Daniel (1998). The City in Literature: An Intellectual and Cultural History. University of California Press. ISBN 9780520920514. OCLC 42417789.
- Levin, Gail (2010). "Art World Power and Women's Incognito Work: The Case of Edward and Jo Hopper". In Levin, Amy K. (ed.). Gender, Sexuality, and Museums: A Routledge Reader. Routledge. ISBN 9780415554916. OCLC 491889371.
- Levin, Gail (1995). Edward Hopper: An Intimate Biography. Alfred A. Knopf. ISBN 0394546644. OCLC 716046833.
- Lyons, Deborah; O'Doherty, Brian (2012). Edward Hopper: Paintings & Ledger Book Drawings. Schirmer/Mosel. ISBN 9783829606028. OCLC 1391403974.
- Mamunes, Lenora (2011). Edward Hopper Encyclopedia. McFarland & Company. ISBN 9780786486434. OCLC 728111198.
- Marcinkiewicz, Paweł (2009). The Rhetoric of the City: Robinson Jeffers and A. R. Ammons. Peter Lang. ISBN 9783631597552. OCLC 466660846.
- O'Doherty, Brian (1973). "Hopper's Voice". American Masters: The Voice and the Myth. Random House. ISBN 9780394464237. OCLC 1080825254.
- Schmied, Wieland (1995) [1992]. Caspar David Friedrich. H. N. Abrams. ISBN 9780810933279. OCLC 30913999.
- Wells, Walter (2007). Silent Theater: The Art of Edward Hopper. Phaidon Press. ISBN 9780714845418. OCLC 1359402053.
- Wirth-Nesher, Hana (1996). City Codes: Reading the Modern Urban Novel. Cambridge University Press. ISBN 9780521473149. OCLC 31815274.

=== Journals and magazines ===
- Colleary, Elizabeth Thompson (Spring–Summer 2004). "Josephine Nivison Hopper: Some Newly Discovered Works". Woman's Art Journal. 25 (1): 3–11. doi:10.2307/3566492. JSTOR 3566492.
- Du Bois, Guy Péne (September 1930). "America's Curious Predicament in Art". Creative Art. 7 (3): 33–35.
- Gaffney, Adrienne (June 29, 2017). "Go Inside Edward Hopper's Private Greenwich Village Studio". Architectural Digest. Archived from the original on 2025-10-08.
- Hopper, Edward (April 1927). "John Sloan and the Philadelphians". The Arts. 11: 169–178.
- Museum of Fine Arts, Boston (April 1935). "Acquisitions, January 11 through March 7, 1935". Bulletin of the Museum of Fine Arts. 33 (196): 28–29. JSTOR 4170520.
- Shadwick, Louis (December 2, 2022). "Edward Hopper's New York". The Art Newspaper. 31 (351): 56. ISSN 0960-6556.
- Soyer, Raphael (Summer 1981). "Six Who Knew Edward Hopper". Art Journal. 41 (2): 130–132. JSTOR 776461.
- Stanton, Joseph (1994). "On Edge: Edward Hopper's Narrative Stillness". Soundings: An Interdisciplinary Journal. 77 (1–2): 21–40. JSTOR 41178875.

=== Newspaper articles ===
- "Funeral of Charles H. Hayden". Boston Evening Transcript. August 31, 1901. p. 13.
- Jewell, Edward Alden (November 27, 1932). "NATIVE ART; A Lively Display at Whitney Museum". The New York Times. p. 9.
- Lang, Melinda (February–March 2023). "Edward Hopper's life on Washington Square" (PDF). Westview News. Vol. 20, no. 2. p. 25.
- "Large bequests are left to charitable institutions". The Boston Globe. September 11, 1901. p. 3.
- "Modern Shuns Honor by Design Academy". The New York Times. March 26, 1932.

=== Art and exhibition catalogs ===
- Barr, Alfred H., ed. (1933). Edward Hopper: Retrospective Exhibition, November 1–December 7, 1933. The Museum of Modern Art. pp. 9–15. OCLC 1134033.
- Edward Hopper's New York Exhibition Checklist (PDF). Whitney Museum of American Art.
- Goodrich, Lloyd (1964). Edward Hopper. Whitney Museum of American Art. OCLC 31479075.
- Levin, Gail (1979). Edward Hopper: The Complete Prints. Norton. pp. 20, 29–36. ISBN 9780393012750. OCLC 4983204.
- Levin, Gail (2006). "Hotel Window (1955)". American Paintings. Sotheby's. Archived from the original on 2026-02-09.
- Modern American Paintings. Department of Fine Arts, Carnegie Institute. Smithsonian Institution. 1932.
- Rathbone, Perry Townsend (1969). American Paintings in the Museum of Fine Arts, Boston. Vol. 1: Text. New York Graphic Society. OCLC 58376.
- Troyen, Carol; Moore, Charlotte Emans; Diamond, Priscilla Kate (1997). American Paintings in the Museum of Fine Arts, Boston: An Illustrated Summary Catalogue. Museum of Fine Arts, Boston. ISBN 9780878464487. OCLC 378520900.
- Troyen, Carol; Kelly, Franklin; Barter, Judith A., eds. (2007). Edward Hopper. MFA Publications; Museum of Fine Arts, Boston. ISBN 9780878467136. OCLC 129510490.

=== Websites ===
- Hopper, Edward (1932). "Room in Brooklyn". Museum of Fine Arts, Boston. Accession no. 35.66.
