= From Plotzk to Boston =

1899 memoir by Mary Antin

From Plotzk to Boston is an 1899 memoir by author and immigration activist Mary Antin (1881–1949). It chronicles her emigration from her hometown of Polotsk in the Russian Empire (now modern Belarus) to the United States in 1894, focusing primarily on her observations of life in unfamiliar surroundings, the emotional trials endured by her family, and the hardships that accompanied their passage to and eventual settlement in Boston, Massachusetts. Her first major publication, it laid the groundwork for her later autobiography and most famous work, The Promised Land (1912).

== Publication origins and inspiration ==
Compiled from a series of letters that Antin wrote to her uncle describing her family's journey to America in 1894, From Plotzk to Boston was inspired by the difficulties that compelled them to leave their homeland as well as Antin's own literary upbringing. Born Maryashe Antin to Israel Pinchus and Esther Antin in 1881, she spent her early years living with her Russian-Jewish family in Polotsk, where she received a private education until a combination of illness and business failures depleted the family's resources and prompted them to immigrate to the United States. Upon arriving in 1894, Antin proceeded to enroll in primary school where her proficiency for the English language allowed her to excel academically and gain positive notice from her teachers. Recognizing her literary talent, they encouraged her writing and secured a publishing deal for her first book with the help of local Jewish philanthropists. Drawing from her correspondence with her uncle, Antin translated her writings from Yiddish to English and consolidated the materials into a memoir. Titled From Plotzk to Boston due to a misprinting of the name of her hometown, its release in 1899 provided a valuable source of income to fund Antin's continued education.

== Contents ==
The memoir begins with Antin's recollection of the financial pressures and tales of American prosperity that swept her hometown of Polotsk in 1891, triggering a massive wave of emigration from Russia to the United States. Struggling to make a living and intrigued by the promise of a better life abroad, her father decides to move the family to America and departs by himself that same year for Boston to secure the employment and income needed to finance passage for the rest of the family. Leaving Polotsk with her mother, two sisters, and brother three years later, Antin describes their travels through Europe and across the Atlantic to join her father. Traveling westward through Russia by train, the family passes through multiple villages and cities that Antin notes for their vibrancy and technologically modern environments compared to the isolated hometown life that she knows. At the same time, she reflects upon the conflicted emotional state of her family, who experience mixed feelings of uneasiness, sadness, and affection for the home and the people that they are leaving.

Antin describes how upon arriving at the German border, the family confronts bureaucratic obstacles that prevent them from moving onward and experience prejudice from German authorities in light of a recent cholera epidemic allegedly spread by Russian emigrants. In response to pleading from Antin's mother, however, a sympathetic officer instructs them to contact Herr Schidorsky, a prominent member of the local Jewish community, who provides them with assistance through his familial connections in the German bureaucracy. As a result of this intervention, the family is able to resume their journey, making their way across the German border towards the port city of Hamburg, but not before subjecting themselves to multiple invasive luggage screenings, health examinations, and unsolicited travel services that they are later billed for. During this segment of the journey, they also establish friendships with fellow travelers and experience culture shock from the overwhelming sounds and activity of the urban life that surround them as they pass through Berlin.

Antin recounts that when they arrive in Hamburg, the family is processed and placed in a crowded émigré camp with poor accommodations, where they await the arrival of their ship to America, Polynesia. After many days of waiting, the family is finally called to board the ship and for the next 17 days, Antin and her family endure harsh conditions below deck, including turbulence, seasickness, and crowded quarters. While simultaneously feeling sadness for departing her homeland and a resolve to push forward and reunite with her father, Antin also expresses her astonishment and wonder at the sight of the ocean and ship activity around her. Arriving in Boston harbor on May 8, 1894, her journey arrives at an emotional conclusion with the reunion of her family and father.

== Release and reception ==
Largely marketed towards Boston's community of Jewish philanthropists, From Plotzk to Boston immediately sold out its initial pressrun in 1899, with Lina Hecht, one of Antin's major benefactors, purchasing the entire first run of 50 copies, requiring the printing of a second edition. Contemporary reviews were also generally positive, with the New York Times concluding, "This story, in all its guilelessness, appealing as it does to human love, will certainly please readers, irrespective of race or creed." Offering similar praise for her writing and the perceived authenticity of her work, the Boston Herald stated, "The whole narrative is very agreeably and naturally written, and nothing is introduced but what the child saw with her own eyes, endured in her own flesh and blood, thought in her own little head." Other publications drew favorable comparisons with Israel Zangwill, the author of the book's preface and an accomplished Jewish writer himself, with the Kalamazoo Gazette proclaiming, "little Mary promises to become the most forceful Jewish writer of English in the world, not excepting Zangwill himself."

== Historical significance ==
From Plotzk to Boston is significant to the study of immigration history for providing an intimate view into the individual experiences, feelings, and circumstances that inspired and shaped immigrant journeys to the United States during the late 19th century. As a personal account of Antin's travels from her homeland in Russia to her settlement in the United States, it offers a glimpse into the American immigrant population at a time when Eastern Europeans were supplanting earlier groups from the western and northern areas of the continent in representation among the total number of new arrivals to the United States. Accordingly, it serves to highlight the social and political forces that influenced immigrants' travels and the attendant pressures that compelled many Russian Jews in particular to depart for the United States in search of a better standard of living, including religious persecution, government oppression, and economic hardship.

Within this context, the memoir is also important to popular understandings and scholarly analysis of the historical immigrant experience for its role in establishing the framework for the American Dream narrative of assimilation. Introduced and described in detail by Antin in her later work The Promised Land, this narrative presents an idealistic and generalized interpretation of immigrant movement and assimilation experiences in which immigrants are uniformly depicted as escaping from poverty, oppression, and prejudice in their homeland for a new life in the United States. Under this paradigm, Antin's experiences reinforce a vision of America as a safe haven where freedom, prosperity, and opportunity are available for all regardless of personal background and with few barriers to social and economic advancement.

== Sources ==
- Antin, Mary. From Plotzk to Boston. Boston: W.B. Clarke, 1899.
- "A Human Document." Boston Herald, April 9, 1900.
- Brinkmann, Tobias. "Traveling with Ballin: The Impact of American Immigration Policies on Jewish Transmigration within Central Europe, 1880–1914," International Review of Social History 53 (2008), 459–84.
- "Russian Prodigy: Girl of 15 for Whom Zangwill Predicts a Great Future." Kalamazoo Gazette, May 14, 1899.
- Martin, Philip. "Trends in Migration to the U.S." Population Reference Bureau. Archived from the original on 8 December 2015.
- Nadell, Pamela S. "Mary Antin: 1881-1949". Jewish Women's Archive.
- "From Russia to America." New York Times, May 27, 1899.
- Yudkoff, Sunny. "The Adolescent Self-fashioning of Mary Antin." Studies in American Jewish Literature 32, Vol. 1 (Spring 2013): 4-35.
