= Kim Conaty =

American museum curator

- Education: Middlebury College (B.A.), Williams College (M.A.), Institute of Fine Arts (NYU) (Ph.D.)
- Occupations: Nancy and Steve Crown Family Chief Curator
- Employer: Whitney Museum of American Art

Kim Conaty is an American art historian and museum curator currently serving as the Nancy and Steve Crown Family Chief Curator at the Whitney Museum of American Art in New York.

== Early life and education ==
Conaty received her B.A. from Middlebury College in 1999, followed by an M.A. in art history from Williams College and a Ph.D. in art history from the Institute of Fine Arts at New York University in 2016. In 2003, Conaty was awarded a Fulbright Fellowship to Germany. She then worked as biennial coordinator for the 2008 Whitney Biennial, following her previous posts as researcher and curatorial intern at the Busch-Reisinger Museum at Harvard University Art Museums, Grey Art Museum, and Clark Art Institute.

== Career ==
In 2008, Conaty was appointed the Sue and Eugene Mercy Jr., Assistant Curator of Drawings and Prints at the Museum of Modern Art in New York, where she curated exhibitions on Marcel Broodthaers, Fluxus, and conceptual art, among other subjects. In December 2015, Conaty was hired as full curator at the Rose Art Museum at Brandeis University. In 2017, Conaty was appointed the Steven and Ann Ames Curator of Drawings and Prints at the Whitney Museum.

During her tenure at the Whitney, she curated exhibitions dedicated to the work of Edward Hopper (2022) and Ruth Asawa (2023), the former becoming one of the best-attended shows in the museum's history. In 2024, she was promoted to the Nancy and Steve Crown Family Chief Curator, replacing Scott Rothkopf who had been appointed the director of the museum. Responsible for the museum's permanent collection, acquisitions, exhibition and conservation activities, the Whitney's chief curator position has been described as "one of the most influential in the contemporary art world".
