= Paweł Marcinkiewicz =

Polish poet and academic (born 1969)

Paweł Marcinkiewicz (born 1969 in Opole) is a Polish poet, translator, literary scholar, and assistant professor at the University of Opole. Notable work includes The Rhetoric of the City (2009), a literary monograph at the intersection of urban studies, The Day He’s Gone (2014), a book of poetry spanning more than two decades of poems, and Colored Alphabets' Flutter (2012), a monograph about poet John Ashbery.

Poet Piotr Florczyk has translated some of his works into English, with his poetry appearing in several anthologies, including one in English (1993) and another in Swedish (2003). Marcinkiewicz is also the author of over 50 journal articles, with his research interest mostly focusing on American literature and translation theory. In 2020, he was awarded a fellowship at the University of Giessen.

== Career ==
Marcinkiewicz was born in Opole, Poland, in 1969. He grew up in the district of Kolonia Gosławicka, a town adjacent to the river Oder. Marcinkiewicz describes his formative years as one that was influenced by the "very exotic urban environment of post-communist Poland". He made his debut as a poet in 1989 in the so-called underground "third circulation" with the poetry chapbook Zostaw noc, niech płynie (Leave the Night, Let It Flow On, 1988).

In the early 1990s, Marcinkiewicz taught English at a primary school. He traveled to the United States in 1994 and later lived for some time in Sweden. These experiences gave rise to the cycle of "American" poems entitled Pod niebieskim liściem Wielkich Jezior (Under the Blue Leaf of the Great Lakes), included in the volume Świat dla opornych, as well as the cycle of "Swedish" poems entitled Pugerups Gård, published in the volume Tivoli.

He graduated with a master's degree in English studies from the University of Wrocław in 1996. Marcinkiewicz pursued a doctorate at the University of Silesia under Tadeusz Sławek. He received his PhD in American Literature in 2004. His doctoral dissertation, titled The City and Literature: A Comparative Study of Urbanism and Forms of Literary Expression from the Enlightenment to Postmodernity, explored a literary approach to urban studies. It was later modified and published as a monograph titled The Rhetoric of the City: Robinson Jeffers and A.R. Ammons (2009). In 2014, he obtained his habilitation at the University of Opole. He is an assistant professor (adiunkt) at the Institute of English Philology of the University of Opole.

== Awards and nominations ==
- 1997 – Polish Cultural Foundation Award for the volume Świat dla opornych
- 2000 – Czesław Miłosz Award, awarded to Paweł Marcinkiewicz and Jacek Podsiadło for their poetic work
- 2016 – Nomination for the Wrocław Silesius Poetry Award for the volume Majtki w górę, majtki w dół

== Selected works ==
=== Poetry ===
- Zostaw noc, niech płynie, Koło "Nowa Kultura," Ruch "Wolność i Pokój," Opole, 1989
- Uciekaj Macinkiewic uciekaj, Staromiejski Dom Kultury, Warsaw, 1990
- 18 wierszy o tym, że ogień będzie różą, poetry chapbook, Okolice, no. 11 (1990/1991)
- Zawieram z tobą przymierze, Inter Esse, Kraków, 1993
- Świat dla opornych, Znak, Kraków, 1997
- Tivoli, Znak, Kraków, 2000
- Real, self-published, Opole, 2004
- Dni, WBPiCAK, Poznań, 2009
- Majtki w górę, majtki w dół, Łódź, 2015

=== Criticism ===
- The Rhetoric of the City: Robinson Jeffers and A. R. Ammons, Peter Lang, Frankfurt, 2009
- "Colored Alphabets' Flutter": John Ashbery and the Twentieth-Century American Avant-Gardes, University of Opole Press, 2012

=== Translations ===
==== Books ====
- W. S. Merwin, Imię powietrza. Wiersze wybrane ("The Name of Air: Selected Poems"), co-translated with Czesław Miłosz, Julia Hartwig, and Karolina Kopczyńska. Kraków: Znak, 2013.
- Seamus Heaney, Przejrzysta pogoda. Wiersze wybrane ("Clear Weather: Selected Poems"), co-translated with Stanisław Barańczak, Magda Heydel, and Adam Szostkiewicz. Kraków: Znak, 2009.
- Derek Walcott, Mapa Nowego Świata. Wiersze wybrane ("Map of the New World: Selected Poems"), co-translated with Stanisław Barańczak, Jerzy Jarniewicz, and others. Kraków: Znak, 2008.
- Richard Brautigan, Łowienie pstrągów w Ameryce (Trout Fishing in America), co-translated with Jacek Podsiadło. Poznań: Rebis, 2000.
- Robert Hass, Zbierając jeżyny. Wybór wierszy ("Picking Blackberries: Selected Poems"), co-translated with Czesław Miłosz, Tadeusz Sławek, and others. Kraków: Znak, 1997.

==== Journals ====
- "On the Poetry of W. S. Merwin," Odra 7–8/2013, Wrocław: Ośrodek Kultury i Sztuki, 2013, pp. 27–29.
- "Robert Hass: A Poet of Our Time," Odra 12/2011, Wrocław: Ośrodek Kultury i Sztuki, 2011, pp. 42–47.
- "Poets of L=A=N=G=U=A=G=E" [essay on the movement known as Language poetry], Odra 2/2011, Wrocław: Ośrodek Kultury i Sztuki, 2011, pp. 52–58.
- "Charles Bernstein and L=A=N=G=U=A=G=E Poetry," Europa. Newsweek, 6 September 2010, p. 16.
- "The Ecstasy of Ekphrasis: A Short History of Ekphrasis and Its Significance in the Poetry of Mary Jo Bang," Odra 10/2010, Wrocław: Ośrodek Kultury i Sztuki, 2010, pp. 29–33.
- "They Lived Somewhere in America" [on John Ashbery’s Planisphere], Europa. Newsweek, 6 April 2010, p. 16.
- "Planisphere: On the Poetry of John Ashbery in the Context of Language Poetry," Odra 5/2010, Wrocław: Ośrodek Kultury i Sztuki, 2010, pp. 48–50.
- "On the Poetry of Ron Padgett," Odra 5/2009, Wrocław: Ośrodek Kultury i Sztuki, 2009, pp. 30–31.
- "A Sun-Flooded Void" [on the poetry of Seamus Heaney], Europa. Newsweek, 20 June 2009, p. 16.
- "Ugly Monsters Can Also Reach Heaven" [on the late work of W. H. Auden], Europa 182/2007, Warsaw: Axel Springer Polska, 2007, p. 16.

== Bibliography ==
- Śliwiński, Piotr (7 June 2004). "Real, Marcinkiewicz, Paweł". Gazeta Wyborcza.
- "Paweł Marcinkiewicz – record in Polish Literary Bibliography". Polish Literary Bibliography (PBL), Institute of Literary Research, Polish Academy of Sciences.
- "Paweł Marcinkiewicz – University of Opole profile". University of Opole (archived). Wayback Machine. Archived from the original on 2013-11-14.
- "Paweł Marcinkiewicz – author profile". literackie.pl.
