= Israel Isidor Elyashev =

Doctor and author

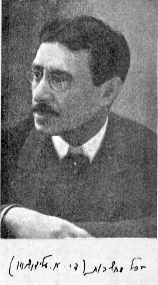

Israel Isidor Elyashev (Yiddish: ישראל איסידאָר עליאַשעװ, 1873–1924) was a Jewish neurologist and the first Yiddish literary critic. He introduced the world to the works of the great contemporary Yiddish classical writers: Sholem Rabinovich, better known as Sholem Aleichem, Mendele Mocher Sefarim, Isaac Leib Peretz and Nachum Sokolov; along with modern Hebrew writers including Chaim Nachman Bialik, and Sholem Asch, among several others.

Elyashev was originally from Kovno (modern-day Kaunas, Lithuania). In his youth, he studied with Rabbi Simcha Zissel Ziv at the Talmud Torah in Grobiņa, Latvia, but was eventually expelled from the school for his "heretical tendencies." He went on to attend a high school in Switzerland, and he then studied medicine and biology in Heidelberg and Berlin.

Israel Isidor Elyashev

Elyashev's pen name was Bal-Makhshoves (Hebrew: בעל מחשבות), meaning "Master [of] Thoughts" or "The Thinker".

Elyashev is best known for his work as a literary critic, writing in Yiddish. He translated Theodor Herzl's Altneuland from German into Yiddish, upon Herzl's personal request. His Yiddish translation of Herzl's work is the language that by far- most of European Jewry had read of Herzl's calling for a Modern Jewish State.

His attitude to Jewish literature, Yiddish, and Hebrew is summed up by something that he wrote in 1918:

[W]e have two languages and a dozen echoes from other foreign languages, but… we have only one literature. And therefore the reader who seeks to become acquainted with the currents of Jewish life, to comprehend the spirit of the Jewish individual and multitude and how they find expression in Jewish literature, that reader does not separate Hebrew writers from Yiddish ones. …All are representatives of our literature, all embody a piece of Jewish life in their writings; all of them are Jewish artists.

Elyashev was also politically active, as a forerunner of the Zionist Movement. He participated in the First Zionist Congress, held in Basel, Switzerland in August 1897, as a delegate from Germany .
