= Hana Wirth-Nesher =

American-Israeli literary scholar and university professor

Professor Hana Wirth-Nesher
- חנה וירת-נשר
- Born: Hana Wroclawski; 2 March 1948 (age 78); Munich, Germany
- Education: B.A., English, University of Pennsylvania; M.A., English and Master of philosophy, Columbia University; PhD, English and Comparative Literature, Columbia University
- Occupations: Professor of English and American Studies
- Years active: 2004–present
- Employer: Tel Aviv University
- Known for: Scholar of American, English, and Jewish American literature Yiddish language revival
- Notable work: Editor, The Cambridge History of Jewish American Literature (2015); Co-editor, The Cambridge Companion to Jewish American Literature (2003)

Hana Wirth-Nesher (Hebrew: חנה וירת-נשר; born 2 March 1948) is an American-Israeli literary scholar and university professor. She is Professor of English and American Studies at Tel Aviv University, where she is also the Samuel L. and Perry Haber Chair on the Study of the Jewish Experience in the United States, and director of the Goldreich Family Institute for Yiddish Language, Literature, and Culture.

Specializing in the role of language, especially Yiddish, in expressing personal identity in Jewish American literature, she has written two books and many essays on American, English, and Jewish American writers. She is the editor of The Cambridge History of Jewish American Literature (2015) and the co-editor (with Michael P. Kramer) of The Cambridge Companion to Jewish American Literature (2003). She is the co-creator and academic co-director of the annual Yiddish summer program at Tel Aviv University.

== Family and early life ==
She was born in Munich, Germany, to Shmuel Brostlavsky (Polish: Wroclawski), a Polish Jew, and his wife, originally from Germany. This was the second marriage for both her parents: her father's first wife and son had been killed by the Nazis in Sieradz, Poland, and her mother's first husband had succumbed to typhoid fever after the couple had been deported to a Siberian labor camp. Her parents met in Uzbekistan and resided in Munich from 1945 to 1949 while awaiting a visa to the United States. While her father never spoke about his experiences during the war, Hana later learned that he had been caught trying to cross the Russian border with his brother and his brother's son, and the Nazis had forced him to play his violin while they massacred Jews. Until his death in 1977, he was frequently hospitalized for severe depression and other mental illnesses.

In 1949, at age one, Hana immigrated to the United States with her parents. There, they shortened their surname to Wirth and settled in Allentown, Pennsylvania, where her father worked in a factory that produced women's and children's clothing. At first they lived in a non-Jewish neighborhood, where Hana was the only Jew in her school and swastikas were daubed on their house. When she was 12, her family moved to a Jewish neighborhood, but were ostracized because they were Holocaust survivors. As a result, Hana "never felt really American". Although she later emigrated to Israel, she does not "feel Israeli" either.

== Education and teaching career ==
She earned her bachelor's degree in English with honors from the University of Pennsylvania in 1970. She then studied for her master's degree, master of philosophy, and PhD in English and comparative literature at Columbia University, completing her education in 1977. She was one of the last doctoral students of American literary critic Lionel Trilling. She engaged in post-doctoral research at the Uriel Weinreich Yiddish Language and Literature Program at the YIVO Institute for Jewish Research from 1978 to 1979.

From 1976 to 1981 she was an assistant professor of English at Lafayette College in Easton, Pennsylvania, and an associate professor from 1981 to 1984. In 1984 she immigrated to Israel, where she became a senior lecturer at Tel Aviv University for the next 10 years. She became an associate professor in 1994. Concurrently, she chaired the Department of English from 1985 to 1990 and from 1993 to 1997. In 2004 she became a full professor of English and American Studies at Tel Aviv University, a position she holds to the present day. Since 1998, she is the Samuel L. and Perry Haber Chair on the Study of the Jewish Experience in the United States, and since 2005, she is the Director of the Goldreich Family Institute for Yiddish Language, Literature, and Culture.

She was a Fulbright visiting professor at Tel Aviv University from 1982 to 1983, and has also been a visiting professor at the University of Konstanz (Summer 1998 and 2000), Johns Hopkins University (Fall 2001), and the University of Illinois at Urbana-Champaign (February 2007). She has guest lectured at numerous universities and colleges across the United States, including Harvard, Yale, Princeton, Northwestern, Dartmouth, University of California, Los Angeles, University of Southern California, Rutgers, New York University, and City University of New York.

== Literary scholar ==
Wirth-Nesher grew up with her father reading to her in Yiddish, her mother and grandmother speaking to her in German, and her friends conversing with her in English. This personal experience with language led her to learn Yiddish "for herself" and to teach American and English literature at the university level. She has written many articles and essays on important writers of American and English literature, including Charles Dickens, Henry James, James Joyce, Mark Twain, Virginia Woolf, along with writers of Jewish American literature such as Sholem Aleichem, Saul Bellow, Cynthia Ozick, Henry Roth, Philip Roth, and Isaac Bashevis Singer.

== Other activities ==
Wirth-Nesher was the associate editor of Prooftexts: A Journal of Jewish Literary History from 1981 to 2004. She was also a consulting editor for The Posen Library of Jewish Culture and Civilization, volume 10.

=== Yiddish summer program ===
In 2005, as director of the newly formed Goldreich Family Institute for Yiddish Language, she co-created an annual Yiddish summer program at Tel Aviv University in conjunction with the Beth Shalom Aleichem cultural center. Wirth-Nesher and Professor Avraham Novershtern of the Hebrew University of Jerusalem and Beth Shalom Aleichem co-direct the academic program, which offers 80 hours of intensive Yiddish language instruction. The program further includes cultural studies such as workshops on Yiddish theatre, music, and poetry, and Yiddish-led tours of Tel Aviv and Jerusalem, as well as evening social events. Between 100 and 130 students from Israel and abroad participate each year.

== Memberships ==
Wirth-Nesher has been an executive board member of the Porter Institute for Poetics and Semiotics at Tel Aviv University since 1992 and the Shirley and Leslie Porter School for Cultural Studies since 1990. She is also a member of these advisory boards: Porter Institute Pre-Publication Collections (since 1994), the Longfellow Institute at the Department of English and American Literature, Harvard University (since 1997), and the James Joyce Institute in Zurich (since 1993). From 1986 to 2005 she was an advisory board member of the Journal of Modern Literature. She has served on several executive committees for the Modern Language Association, and consulted on the Jewish American experience as a member of the program committee of the Museum of the Diaspora from 1997 to 2000. Since 2004, she has been a member of the binational board of the Fulbright Foundation.

== Personal ==
Her husband was born in Israel and is a child of Holocaust survivors. They have three children.

== Bibliography ==
=== As author ===
- Call It English: The Languages of Jewish American Literature. Princeton University Press. 2009. ISBN 978-1400829538.
- City Codes: Reading the modern urban novel. Cambridge University Press. 1996. ISBN 0521473144.

=== As editor ===
- The Cambridge History of Jewish American Literature. Cambridge University Press. 2015. ISBN 978-1316395349.
- The Cambridge Companion to Jewish-American Literature. Cambridge University Press. 2003. ISBN 0521796997. (with Michael P. Kramer)
- Ehrlich, Joseph (1999). Sabbath. Syracuse University Press. ISBN 0815605900. (editor)
- New Essays on Call It Sleep. Cambridge University Press. 1996. ISBN 0521456568.
- What Is Jewish Literature?. Jewish Publication Society. 1994. ISBN 0827605382.

=== Selected chapters ===
- Budick, Emily Miller, ed. (2012). "Magnified and Sanctified: Liturgy in Contemporary American Jewish Literature". Ideology and Jewish Identity in Israeli and American Literature. SUNY Press. pp. 115–130. ISBN 978-0791490143.
- Wertheimer, Jack, ed. (2007). "The Accented Imagination: Speaking and writing Jewish America". Imagining the American Jewish Community. UPNE. pp. 286–303. ISBN 978-1584656708.
- Parrish, Timothy, ed. (2007). "Roth's Autobiographical Writings". The Cambridge Companion to Philip Roth. Cambridge University Press. p. 158ff. ISBN 978-1139827935.
- Paddison, Ronan, ed. (2001). "Impartial Maps: Reading and writing cities". Handbook of Urban Studies. Sage Publications, Ltd. p. 62. ISBN 0-8039-7695-X.
- Gutman, Huck, ed. (1991). "The Counterlife: Israeli Perspectives on American Literature". As Others Read Us: International Perspectives on American Literature. University of Massachusetts Press. p. 131. ISBN 0870236296.
- Benstock, Bernard, ed. (1988). "Reading Joyce's City: Public Space, Self, and Gender in Dubliners". James Joyce: The Augmented Ninth : Proceedings of the Ninth International James Joyce Symposium, Frankfurt, 1984. Syracuse University Press. pp. 282–292. ISBN 0815624468.

=== Selected articles ===
- "Tradition, the Individual Talent, and Yiddish". In Geveb: A Journal of Yiddish Studies. 7 December 2015.
- "Call It Sleep: Jewish, American, Modernist, Classic". Judaism: A Quarterly Journal of Jewish Life and Thought. 22 September 1995. Archived from the original on 20 February 2016 – via HighBeam Research.
- "Final Curtain on the War: Figure and Ground in Virginia Woolf's between the Acts". Style. 22 June 1994. Archived from the original on 20 February 2016 – via HighBeam Research.
- Wirth-Nesher, Hana (Winter 2001). "Resisting Allegory, or Reading "Eli, the Fanatic" in Tel Aviv". Prooftexts. 21 (1): 103–112. doi:10.1353/ptx.2001.0010. S2CID 161252512.
