= Mary Antin =

Jewish-American author and immigration rights activist

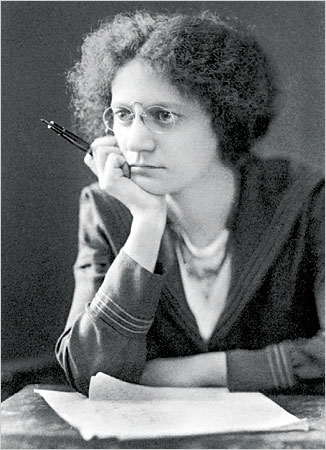
- Antin in 1915
- Born: Mary Antin; June 13, 1881; Polotsk, Vitebsk Governorate, Russian Empire
- Died: May 15, 1949 (aged 67); Suffern, New York
- Education: Teachers College, Columbia University (1901–1902); Barnard College (1902–1904)
- Spouse: Amadeus William Grabau (m. Oct. 5, 1901)
- Children: Josephine Esther
- Writing career
- Genre: Memoir
- Notable work: The Promised Land

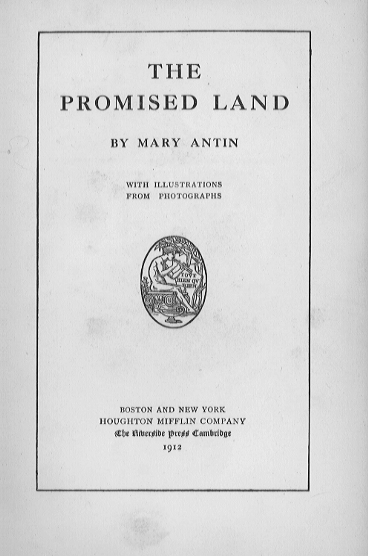
1912 Book The Promised Land (autobiography)

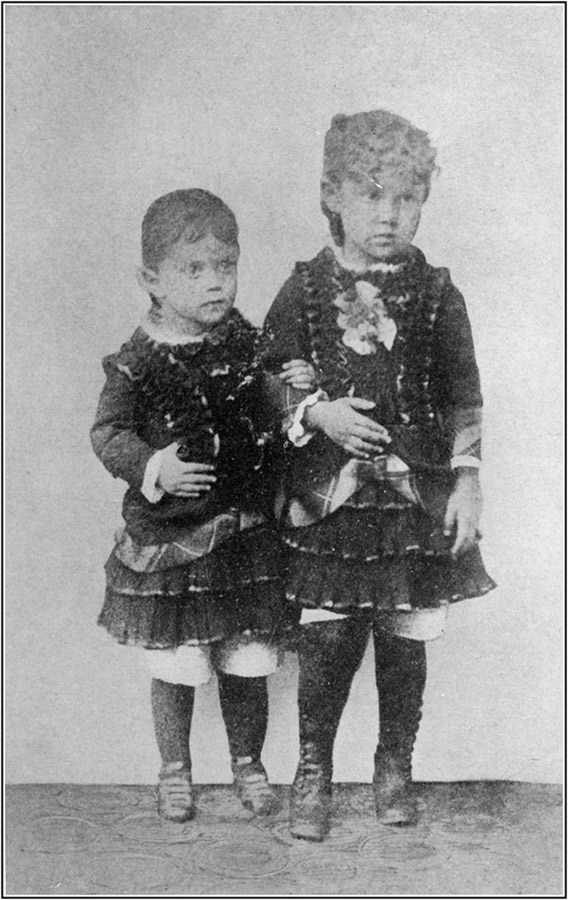
Mary Antin (Mashke) and sister Fetchke, as young children

Mary Antin (born Maryashe Antin; June 13, 1881 – May 15, 1949) was a Jewish-American author and immigration rights activist. She is best known for her 1912 autobiography The Promised Land, an account of her emigration and subsequent Americanization.

== Life ==
Mary Antin was the second of six children born to Israel and Esther Weltman Antin, a Jewish family living in Polotsk, in the Vitebsk Governorate of the Russian Empire (present-day Belarus). Israel Antin emigrated to Boston in 1891, and three years later he sent for Mary and her mother and siblings.

She married Amadeus William Grabau, a geologist, in 1901, and moved to New York City where she attended Teachers College of Columbia University and Barnard College. Antin is best known for her 1912 autobiography The Promised Land, which describes her public school education and assimilation into American culture, as well as life for Jews in Czarist Russia. After its publication, Antin lectured on her immigrant experience to many audiences across the country.

During World War I, while she campaigned for the Allied cause, her husband's pro-German activities precipitated their separation and her physical breakdown. Amadeus was forced to leave his post at Columbia University to work in China, where he became "the father of Chinese geology." She was never physically strong enough to visit him there.

During World War II, Amadeus was interned by the Japanese and died shortly after his release in 1946. Mary Antin died of cancer on May 15, 1949.

== Legacy ==
She is commemorated on the Boston Women's Heritage Trail.
