= The Promised Land (autobiography) =

1912 autobiography by Mary Antin

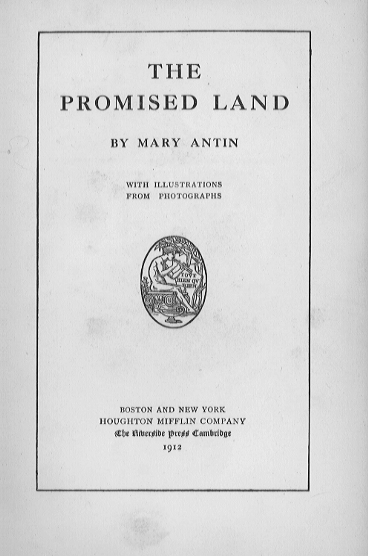
- Title page of the first edition
- Author: Mary Antin
- Language: English
- Genre: Autobiography
- Publisher: Houghton Mifflin Company
- Publication date: 1912
- Publication place: United States

The Promised Land is the 1912 autobiography of Mary Antin. It tells the story of her early life in what is now Belarus and her immigration to the United States in 1894. The book focuses on her attempts to assimilate into the culture of the United States. It received very positive reviews and sold more than 85,000 copies in the three decades after its release. The book's popularity allowed Antin to begin speaking publicly, a platform that she used to promote acceptance of immigration to the United States. Some Americans hostile to immigration criticized The Promised Land, disagreeing with her claim to count as an American. Some Jewish writers criticized the book for leaning too assimilationist, arguing she did not sufficiently respect her heritage.
