= Richard Fung =

Canadian artist and public intellectual (born 1954)

- Sea in the Blood, 2000, 26 min., colour video
- Born: 1954 (age 71–72); Port of Spain, Trinidad
- Known for: Video artist
- Notable work: Sea in the Blood, 2000
- Awards: Bell Canada Award for Outstanding Achievement in Video Art

Richard Fung (born 1954) is a video artist, writer, public intellectual and theorist who currently lives and works in Toronto, Ontario. He was born in Port of Spain, Trinidad, and is openly gay.

Fung was a professor at OCAD University. He earned an undergraduate degree at the University of Toronto, and received a Master of Education in sociology and cultural studies at the University of Toronto.

Fung's work in video explores the role of Asian men in gay pornography, while addressing the intersections between colonialism, immigration, racism, homophobia, and AIDS. Many of his works have been presented at venues in Canada and the United States.

Fung is an activist and founded the Toronto-based organization Gay Asians of Toronto in 1980.

In 2019, he was presented the Bonham Centre Award from the Mark S. Bonham Centre for Sexual Diversity Studies, University of Toronto, for his contributions to the advancement and education of issues around sexual identification.

== Early life and family ==
Fung produced a short documentary titled My Mother's Place (1990), a tribute to his mother Rita. The documentary records Rita's Chinese-Trinidadian childhood, and the family's immigration to Canada, while focusing on the formation of Fung's complex identity in the process of coming out to his family.

== Professional career ==
Fung has been published several times in magazines such as The Asianadian and Fuse. Early on in his career Fung worked as an animator for community video production, and later became a staff producer at Rogers Cable. After directing his first film, Orientations, Fung joined the DEC Film and Video distribution in 1984 and assisted in the Toronto's anti-racism film festival Colour Positive.

Initially studying at the Ontario College of Art and Design, Fung left school and worked as a video animator at Lawrence Heights, a public housing area in Toronto. Working with the Lawrence Heights community, Fung produced his own work and trained residents to produce their own videos. These works were aired on the Lawrence Heights community television channel.

Fung produced his first independent video, Orientations: Lesbian and Gay Asians in 1984. He produced several videos that won awards and were screened in numerous venues and archived in various locations such as the London Institute of Contemporary Art, Chicago's Art Institute, and the Getty Gallery in Los Angeles.

Fung taught at the Ontario College of Art and Design. He was the Chancellor's Visiting associate professor at University of California Irvine, a visiting assistant professor at State University of New York Buffalo and a visiting scholar at the Mass Communications Research Centre, Jamia Millia Islamia in New Delhi. Before working at Ontario College of Art and Design, Fung was the coordinator of the Centre for Media and Culture in Education at the Ontario Institute for Studies in Education at the University of Toronto.

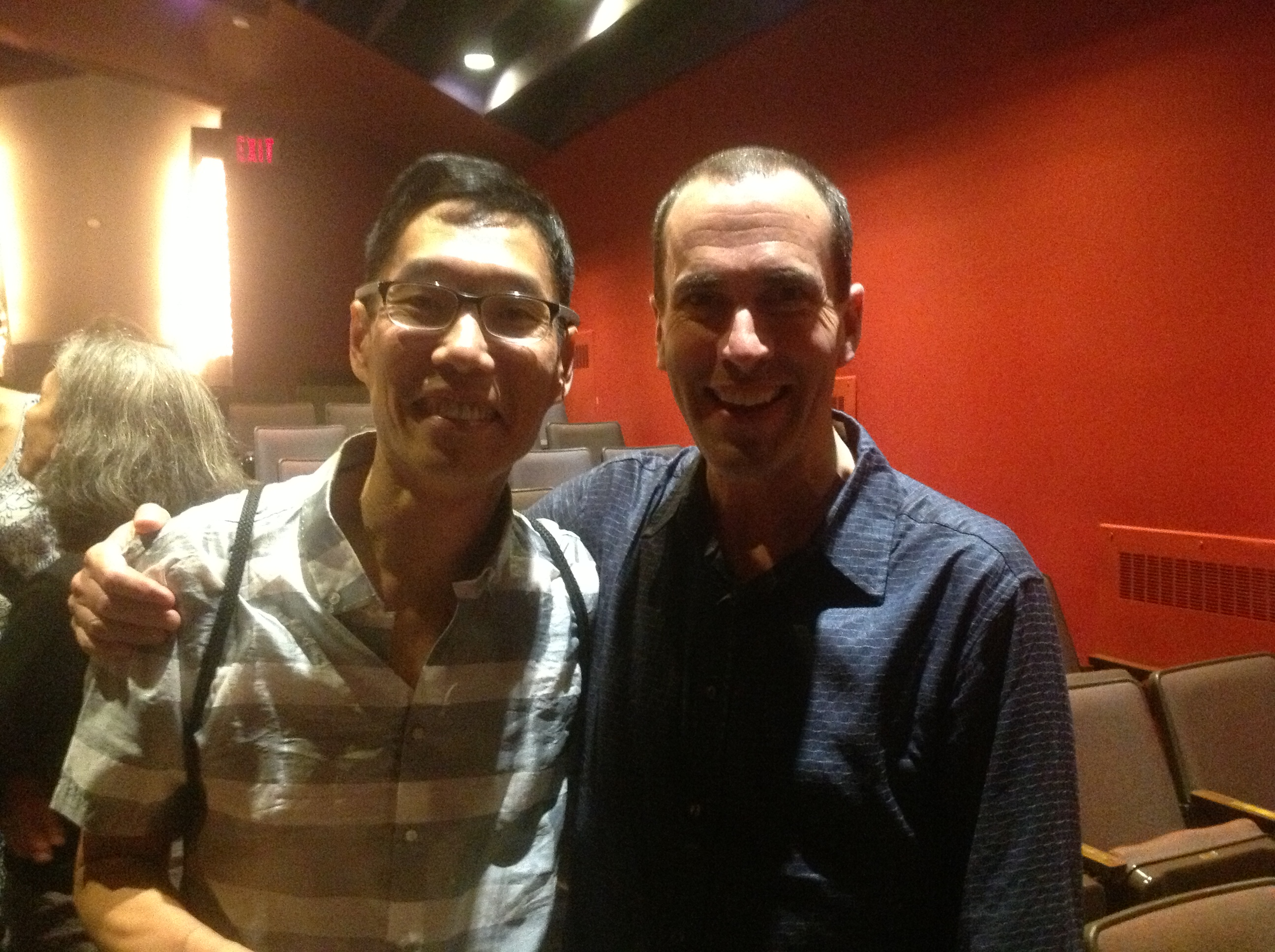
Fung (L) with John Greyson in May 2013

Fung served as a member on the editorial boards of Fuse and Amerasia. He is a member of the Caribbean Contemporary Arts in Trinidad, Toronto's Images Festival, the Racial Equality Committee of the Canada Council for the Arts, and the Toronto Arts Council. Fung is a programmer for the Inside Out Lesbian and Gay Film and Video Festival. A former Rockefeller Fellow at the Center for Media, Culture and History at New York University, Fung has lectured across North America, Europe, Asia and Australia. He has written and published on aspects of culture and identity.

In 2021, he was one of the participants in John Greyson's experimental short documentary film International Dawn Chorus Day.

== Influences ==
=== AIDS ===
Richard Fung, along with video activists Gregg Bordowitz, Jean Carlomusto, Alexandra Juhasz, and James Wentzy, shared a goal of looking back at the historical developments in AIDS activism and its normalization in North America. Richard Fung's video essay Sea in the Blood (2000) allowed him to show his audience the seriousness of AIDS, documenting his experience of having a close family member battling thalassemia and a partner fighting AIDS. Richard's relationship to thalassemia came about via his sister Nan, and his relationship to AIDS via his partner Tim McCaskell. Sea in the Blood is a reflection on race, sexuality, and disease, revolving around two trips that significantly affected his life. During the first trip, in 1962, Fung traveled from Trinidad to England with his sister Nan to meet an eminent hematologist interested in her disease. His second trip took place in 1977 when Fung and his partner, Tim McCaskell, made a pilgrimage from Europe to Asia. Nan died before Richard and Tim could return home. Fung's personal accounts are riddled with love, loss, and AIDS. He aimed to avoid sentimentality and lure the audience to feel as he does, through his video essay. Richard uses blood to symbolize HIV/AIDS and thalassemia, as thalassalemia is an inherited blood disorder and HIV/AIDS is a viral blood infection that passes from individual to individual.

=== Asian homosexuality ===
During the breakout of AIDS in the United States, those surrounding Fung in Canada often said there was no real danger to gay men in their country. Little did Fung know, a plethora of Asian men around him were HIV+, and some even died. Focusing specifically on racism and AIDS in the Asian community, Fung realized that their side was being ignored in the narrative that has primarily been about white gay men. Fung attributes this obliviousness to the stereotype that Asian men in general are not sexual beings, and therefore cannot be homosexual. The degree at which social stigma takes place is bringing about the sort of shame and seclusion that has ravished the community during this time period.

Steam Clean (1990) is a video commissioned by the Gay Men's Health Crisis (GMHC) of New York, and the AIDS Committee of Toronto. This work focuses on the discourse of sexual performance, and the intersectional nature of identity and political practice. Steam Clean shows two men having sex in a steam room. Fung aims to encourage the practice of safe sex in the lives of the gay Asian community. The sauna is instructional porn used to create a space that guides viewers into what may feel like a seminar room, for the discussion of safe sex by young community educators. Fung's use of the sauna as a setting is what some may call "homoscape," which are streams of cultural material moving back and forth from national boundaries of perceived stabilities. His use of the sauna was aimed not only as a space of sex, but as a "narrative [for] conventions and expectations, [where] the conjugal drive is resolved." Fung's focus is to direct the viewer towards the '"ethnoscape" and "homoscape" on the premise of how they overlap in a dynamic way "of rootedness, coalition, and intervention".

=== Homosexual Asian men and pornography ===
Through his pieces such as Orientations (1984) and Looking for My Penis (1991), Fung points out how the production of mainstream pornography caters to white viewers. Such constructions reveal power relations emphasizing white supremacy. Fung highlights how mainstream gay porn is more readily available to Asian men than independent productions, disproportionately affecting how gay Asian men view their sexuality. In his video Orientations, Asian men are constructed as sexual subjects as rather than sexual objects. In this Fung addresses Asians as taking charge of their sexuality and sexual interests. Looking For my Penis (1991) explores the importance of having different representations within mainstream commercial porn. Print pornography is often the first introduction to gay sexuality, especially for gay Asian men who are economically and socially disadvantaged, isolated and without support. Current commercial gay porn caters predominantly and almost exclusively to white viewers. Fung points out how this constructs gay identity as exclusively white.

=== Race, homosexuality, and family ===
Growing up in Trinidad, Fung attended a Catholic-based school which solidified his views about race and class and its effects in any given society. He moved for secondary school and Canada for university. In Canada, Fung met his future partner, Tim McCaskell, at a Marxist study group. The family expectation that Fung would be an architect did not become reality. He attempted to study industrial design but instead entered the photoelectric arts department at the Ontario College of Art.

In many of Fung's works relating to his family, such as Sea in the Blood (2000), he explores how lesbians and gay men experience being exiled by kinship. The coming-out process provokes fraught relationships between members of LGBT and their families and the AIDS pandemic contributes to an environment of exclusion and disappointment. Fung's works focus widely on queers of colour, drawing predominantly from personal experiences as an Asian homosexual. In My Mother's Place (1990), Fung addresses his relationship with his mother and is made up of disclosures of what to reveal and what to hint at, eliminating details while refraining from committing to lies; being both "inside and outside" the frame of kinship. The queer figure of inside/outside evokes "the structures of alienation, splitting, and identification which together produce a self and an other, subject and an object, an unconscious and a conscious, an interiority and an exteriority ... but the figure inside/outside, which encapsulates the structure of language, repression, and subjectivity, also designates the structure of exclusion, oppression, and repudiation". Queer theorist José Esteban Muñoz writes about In My Mother's Place in his book Disidentifications: Queers of Color and the Performance of Politics. According to Muñoz, Fung's performances can be understood as "autoethnography" due to their employment of tactics like "postcolonial mimicry" and "hybridity". In Fung's Sea in the Blood, he documents his painful negotiation between having to choose between his blood family and his chosen family (relationship with his partner Tim).

Most of Fung's videos touch on his family use a style of predominantly personal narration and an impassive scientific account that illustrates how intimate family histories are shaped by race, ethnicity, and colonialism. His videos pull on subtle imagery, such as the use of waves and the sea (Fung on the beach with Nan as a child and later swimming with his lover Tim). The use of waves and the sea are fluids symbolizing not only the blood as a bearer of illness (Nan's rare blood disease thalassemia and Tim's battle with AIDS), but as a site of pleasure, barriers, and his family's immigration to Canada. In Fung's essay, "Programming the Public", he explores the politics of addressing the audience in his works. Highlighting how gender- or race-based programming must weigh the "phenomenal pleasure of collectively consuming identity-based programs addressing 'you' against the challenge of achieving 'mixed' and formally varied programs that construct new horizons of reception and attract new audiences." Exploring the conflicts between genders, ethnicities, racial differences and divergent communities of tastes, Fung touches on how presentation of film and video and its reception reflect paradoxes of identity, access, and power. Audience reception is then rooted in ones' status and language, reflecting a hierarchical ladder of differences based on gender, race, and class.

== Selected videography ==
- Chinese Characters (1986)
- Orientations (1986)
- The Way to My Father's Village (1988)
- Safe Place (1989)
- Steam Clean (1990)
- My Mother's Place (1990)
- Fighting Chance (1990)
- Out of the Blue (1991)
- Dirty Laundry (1996)
- School Fag (1998)
- Sea in the Blood (2000)
- Islands (2002)
- Uncomfortable (2005)
- Rex vs. Singh (2008)
- Dal Puri Diaspora (2012)
- Re:Orientations (2016)
- (...) (2020)

== Selected writings ==
- Fung, Richard. "Remaking home movies." in Mining the Home Movie: Excavations in Histories and Memories, edited by Karen L. Ishizuka and Patricia Zimmerman, Berkeley, University of California, 2008 pgs. 29–40
- Fung, Richard. "After essay – questioning history, questioning art." p. 37-42. In On Aboriginal Representation in the Gallery. Edited by Lydia Jessup with Shannon Bagg. Hull, Quebec: Canadian Museum of Civilization, 2002

== Awards ==
- 2019: Bonham Centre Award from The Mark S. Bonham Centre for Sexual Diversity Studies, University of Toronto
- 2014: Best Film, Caribbean Tales Film Festival
- 2012: Samsung Audience Award Toronto Int'l Reel Asian Film Festival
- 2010: Chalmers Arts Fellowship 2005: Curatorial Writing Award: Essay Contemporary, OAAG 2003: Pioneer Award, Chinese Canadian National Council
- 2005 Ontario Association of Art Galleries award for Curatorial Writing
- 2003: Pioneer Award, Chinese Canadian National Council
- 2003: Best Experimental Film, Worldwide Short Film Festival
- 2002: Telefilm Canada Award for Best Film/Video, Images
- 2001: Toronto Arts Award, Media Arts
- 2000 Bell Canada Award for outstanding achievement in video art
- 2000: Margot Bindhardt Award, TAC Grants from Toronto Arts Council, Ontario Arts Council, Canada Council for the Arts, Ontario Film Development Corporation and Social Sciences and Humanities Research Council
