= How to Survive a Plague =

2012 American documentary film by David France

- Promotional poster
- Directed by: David France
- Written by: David France; Todd Woody Richman; Tyler H. Walk
- Produced by: David France; Howard Gertler
- Cinematography: Derek Wiesehahn
- Edited by: Todd Woody Richman; Tyler H. Walk
- Music by: Stuart Bogie
- Production companies: Public Square Films; Ninety Thousand Words
- Distributed by: Mongrel Media (Canada theatrical); Sundance Selects (USA theatrical); IFC
- Release dates: January 22, 2012 (Sundance Film Festival); September 21, 2012 (United States (limited))
- Running time: 109 min.
- Country: United States
- Language: English
- Box office: $132,055

How to Survive a Plague is a 2012 American documentary film depicting the early years of the AIDS epidemic, and the efforts of activist groups ACT UP and TAG. It was directed by David France, a journalist who covered AIDS from its beginnings. France's first film, it was dedicated to his partner Doug Gould who died of AIDS-related pneumonia in 1992.

== Production ==
The documentary was produced using over 700 hours of archived footage, including news coverage, interviews, and footage of demonstrations, meetings, and conferences filmed by ACT UP members themselves. France notes that the activists were aware their actions were historic and that many of them would likely die. The film premiered in select theaters across the United States on September 21, 2012, and also includes footage of a 1989 demonstration during mass at St. Patrick's Cathedral in 1989.

== Subjects ==
People featured in the film include:

- Bill Bahlman
- David Barr
- Gregg Bordowitz
- George H. W. Bush (archive footage)
- Bill Clinton (archive footage)
- Spencer Cox
- Jim Eigo
- Susan Ellenberg
- Anthony Fauci
- Mark Harrington
- Jesse Helms (archive footage)
- Garance Franke-Ruta
- Larry Kramer
- Mathilde Krim
- Ed Koch (archive footage)
- Iris Long
- Ray Navarro
- Ann Northrop (archive footage)
- Bob Rafsky
- Peter Staley

== Summary ==
Beginning at the start of the HIV/AIDS epidemic in New York City, the documentary follows a group of AIDS activists and founders of the AIDS group ACT UP, and follows their struggle for response from the United States government and medical establishment in developing effective HIV/AIDS medications. Activists took it upon themselves to convince the FDA to approve drugs which could slow or even halt the HIV virus, and demanded that drug trials (which would usually take 7–10 years) be shortened so potentially life-saving treatments could be made available. The film also documents the underground market for HIV drugs: many people relied on drugs imported from other countries, which were believed to potentially slow down the HIV virus despite not being FDA-approved.

At the time, the only drug available to slow the progression of HIV was AZT, which in many cases was toxic to HIV-infected people. The cost of AZT was about $10,000 per year in the late 1980s. ACT UP's efforts led to the creation of the International AIDS Conference. Eventually, DDI, an alternative to AZT that did not cause blindness, was released by the FDA despite not going through a full-length safety trial.

HIV activists also protested the immigration policies banning HIV-positive people from immigrating to the United States as being discriminatory and homophobic.

When existing drugs proved ineffective as treatment for HIV, TAG lobbied for more research into the HIV virus. In 1996, protease inhibitors were released. These consist of a combination of drugs which lower the HIV viral load in patients more than any drug had before. It was considered a breakthrough in HIV and AIDS research and continues to be used as a treatment for HIV and AIDS.

The documentary included interviews with HIV activists, physicians and members of underground organizations as well as clips of the protests, meetings and news coverage taking place during the 1980s and 1990s.

== Book version ==
France's book of the same title, expanding on the material, events, and people covered in the film, was published in 2016 to critical acclaim. It was described as "the definitive book on AIDS activism", was long-listed for the Andrew Carnegie Medal for Excellence, won the 2017 Baillie Gifford Prize for Non-Fiction and was named to numerous best-of and top-ten lists, including the New York Times 100 Notable Books for 2016.

== Release ==
The film had its world premiere at the Sundance Film Festival in January 2012.

It opened in a limited theatrical release in the United States on September 21, 2012.

== Reception ==
=== Critical response ===
Currently, the film has a rating of 98% on Rotten Tomatoes, and an average score of 8.40/10, based on 80 reviews. The website's critical consensus states, "Angry, powerful, and stirring, How to Survive a Plague is a brilliantly constructed documentary about the activists who pushed for action to combat the AIDS epidemic". It also has a score of 86 out of 100 on Metacritic, based on 23 critics, indicating "universal acclaim".

AIDS historian Sarah Schulman has criticized the film for its focus on wealthy, white activists over the "different kinds of people from every class and background" involved in ACT UP.

=== Accolades ===
How to Survive a Plague received awards for best documentary of 2012 from the Gotham Independent Film Awards, GALECA: The Society of LGBTQ Entertainment Critics, and from the Boston Society of Film Critics. It was nominated for Best Documentary at the 30th Independent Spirit Awards.

It was nominated for the Academy Award for Best Documentary Feature at the 85th Academy Awards. The film also won a GLAAD Media Award for Outstanding Documentary and a Peabody Award. It was nominated for a Directors Guild Award and the Grand Jury Prize at the Sundance Film Festival. Critic A. O. Scott of The New York Times named How to Survive a Plague one of the best five documentaries of 2012. Fellow New York Times critic Stephen Holden called the documentary the eighth best film of 2012.

== See also ==
- Grassroots Activism
- International Aids Society
- United in Anger: A History of ACT UP, a 2012 documentary
