= Gregg Gonsalves =

American epidemiologist, health activist and MacArthur Fellow

- Born: October 21, 1963 (age 62); Mineola, New York, United States
- Education: Yale University (B.S.); Yale School of Public Health (Ph.D.)
- Occupations: Health activist (HIV/AIDS, opioid crisis, COVID-19), epidemiologist
- Employer(s): Yale School of Public Health and Yale Law School
- Known for: ACT UP New York Treatment Action Group, Yale Global Health Justice Partnership
- Awards: Open Society Fellowship; NIDA Avenir Award; John M. Lloyd Foundation AIDS Leadership Award; MacArthur Fellowship

Gregg Gonsalves (born October 21, 1963) is a global health activist, an epidemiologist, an associate professor at Yale School of Public Health and an associate professor (adjunct) at Yale Law School. As well as being co-director of Yale Law School's Global Health Justice Partnership, Gonsalves is the public health correspondent of the progressive magazine The Nation.

== Early life ==
He was born in Mineola, New York, on October 21, 1963, grew up in nearby East Meadow, New York, and attended East Meadow High School. His parents were New York City school teachers, both of whom were born and grew up in Brooklyn, New York, with his father's family originally from Madeira and his mother's family from Sicily. He attended Tufts University starting in 1981, but dropped out before finishing his BA degree in English and American literature and Russian language and literature. He has two sisters, Carin Gonsalves, a physician in Philadelphia, and Dana Gonsalves, a commercial artist in New York City.

== Career ==
He began working with the AIDS Coalition to Unleash Power (ACT UP) in 1990, going on to co-found the Treatment Action Group (TAG) in 1992, with his colleagues from the Treatment and Data Committee of ACT UP New York, including Peter Staley, Mark Harrington, and Spencer Cox. With TAG, he authored several reports on HIV research, including a critical review of AIDS research at the National Institutes of Health, which led to a reorganization of the NIH's AIDS program by Congress. He found out he was HIV+ in 1995. In 2000, Gonsalves went on to join Gay Men's Health Crisis and its Department of Public Policy. In 2006, Gonsalves moved to Cape Town to work for the AIDS and Rights Alliance for Southern Africa where he was part of campaigns to expand access to antiretroviral therapy in Southern Africa. In the mid-2000s, he gave well-regarded plenary speeches at two back-to-back International AIDS Conferences in Toronto and Mexico City. He is also a co-founder of the International Treatment Preparedness Coalition, a collective of AIDS activists from around the world fighting for access to AIDS treatment and other life-saving medicines through education, monitoring and advocacy. In 2008, he received $100,000 as the first recipient of the AIDS Leadership Award from the John M. Lloyd Foundation.

In 2008, he enrolled in Yale College as part of the Eli Whitney Students Program and obtained a BS with distinction in Ecology and Evolutionary Biology in 2011. From 2011 to 2012, he was an Open Society Foundations Fellow comparing social movements on AIDS, tuberculosis and maternal health in South Africa, Brazil and Ukraine. In 2012, he enrolled in a Ph.D. program in the Epidemiology of Microbial Diseases at Yale School of Public Health and Yale Graduate School of Arts and Sciences obtaining a PhD in 2017, where he also co-founded the Yale Global Health Justice Partnership, the first collaboration between the public health and law schools at Yale. He writes regularly for the popular press and has contributed op-eds and articles to The New York Times, The Washington Post, Foreign Policy and The Nation. He joined the faculty of Yale School of Public Health in July 2017. His research focuses on using quantitative models to improve the delivery of services and shape policy-making on HIV/AIDS. At Yale, he is affiliated with the Public Health Modeling Unit and the Yale Program in Addiction Medicine. In 2019, he received an Avenir award from the National Institute on Drug Abuse, a grant program devoted "to early-stage investigators who propose highly innovative studies [and] researchers who represent the future of addiction science" for his proposal to examine the syndemic of HIV, hepatitis C and overdose in the context of the US opioid crisis.

== Awards and honors ==
In 2008, he won the John M. Lloyd Foundation's inaugural AIDS Leadership Award. Gonsalves and Mark Harrington are the only two AIDS activists to ever receive a MacArthur Fellowship, commonly but unofficially known as the "Genius Grant". The two worked together and were members of ACT UP and TAG.

== See also ==
- LGBT people in science
- List of Italian Americans
- List of Portuguese Americans
