= Stephen Gendin =

American AIDS activist (1966–2000)

- Stephen Gendin
- Born: February 20, 1966; Ypsilanti, Michigan
- Died: July 19, 2000 (aged 34); New York City, United States
- Education: Brown University
- Known for: AIDS activism
- Notable work: I was a teenage HIV prevention activist

Stephen Gendin (February 20, 1966 – July 19, 2000) was an American AIDS activist in the late 1980s and the 1990s, whose advocacy is credited with having promoted changes in government policy that improved the lives of HIV positive people. He was involved with the ACT UP, ActUp/RI, Sex Panic!, the Community Prescription Service, POZ Magazine and the Radical Faeries. HIV positive himself, he dedicated the last fifteen years of his life to helping care for those also living with HIV/AIDS. He was a founder and the chief executive of the Community Prescription Service, an organization that distributes information designed to help people with HIV and AIDS as well as supplying medication via mail order.

== Early life ==
Gendin was raised in Ypsilanti, Michigan. He was Valedictorian of his high school and then attended Brown University in Providence, Rhode Island, where he learned that he was HIV positive as a first-year student in 1985. He aggressively experimented with new medications for HIV and maintained a healthy and active lifestyle for many years until his death.

== AIDS Activism ==
Gendin was a recognized genius who was offered membership of Mensa. Gendin was a founding member of ACT UP/NY, and helped found ActUp/RI.

== Journalism ==
Gendin was a regular contributor to the magazine POZ. He used his column to discuss in graphic detail the toll that AIDS took on his body, as well as sharing his fantasies of political assassination and the deeply conflicted feelings of guilt and pleasure that he experienced after having unprotected sex. Although his confession of his sometimes reckless behavior caused outrage among many gay men at the time, after his death, many recognized that his controversial disclosures provoked life-saving awareness among gay men of the risks involved in increasingly widespread but rarely discussed practices of unprotected intercourse.

== Death and legacy ==
Gendin died on July 19, 2000, at the age of 34, from AIDS-induced lymphoma. In the summer of 2000, he was eulogized in a widely reprinted speech by Larry Kramer. The chemotherapy he was receiving to treat the disease put him into cardiac arrest. His activism was pivotal in reforming the FDA drug approval process to expedite HIV and AIDS patients' access to more effective anti-retroviral treatments.

== Publications ==
=== Book Chapter ===
- "I Was a Teenage HIV Prevention Activist"

=== POZ Magazine Articles ===
- "Jesse Helms Must Die"
- "Riding Bareback"
- "Membership has its Privileges"
- "At the End of my Rope"
- "AIDS is Over"
- "You Can't Take it with You"
- "Confessions of a Jerk"
- "Stop the World, I Want to Get Off"
- "How Am I?"
- "Bad News Bear"
- "They Shoot Barebackers, Don't They?"
- "The Seven Year Itch"
- "Both Sides Now"
- "On the Runs"
- "The Lost Day"
- "The Hole Truth"
- "Last Word" - Oct 2000
