= Mark Harrington (HIV/AIDS activist) =

American AIDS researcher and activist

- Born: 1959 or 1960 (age 66–67); San Francisco, California, U.S.
- Education: Harvard University (BA)
- Occupations: HIV/AIDS activist, researcher
- Known for: HIV/AIDS activism, founding of the Treatment Action Group
- Awards: 1997 MacArthur Fellows Program; 2007 Bill and Melinda Gates Foundation Grant

Mark Harrington (born in 1959 or 1960) is an HIV/AIDS researcher, AIDS and tuberculosis activist, and the co-founder and policy director of the Treatment Action Group (TAG).

After graduating from Harvard University in 1983, Harrington moved to New York City. When many of his friends became infected with HIV, he joined the AIDS Coalition to Unleash Power (ACT UP). As part of ACT UP's Treatment and Data Committee, Harrington fostered relationships with government officials associated with AIDS research. Disagreements on how best to advocate for research led him and other ACT UP members to leave the organization and found TAG. With TAG, Harrington worked closely with the National Institutes of Health (NIH) and the Food and Drug Administration (FDA) to advance the development of antiretroviral therapy for HIV.

Over the years, Harrington has distinguished himself as a scientist and researcher in his own right and has worked to fight HIV/AIDS and tuberculosis in sub-Saharan Africa.

== Early life ==
Harrington was born in San Francisco and grew up in the city's suburbs, where he lived with his liberal-minded and well-educated family. He is the eldest of four children. His father Richard was a lawyer and his mother Judith is a painter. His father was a local celebrity for his work defending conscientious objectors during the Vietnam War, including a role as lead attorney in the Supreme Court case Negre v. Larsen.

Harrington was admitted to Harvard University after graduating from Lowell High School in 1977, expecting to follow in his father's footsteps and study law or public policy. It was in his first year at Harvard that Harrington discovered he was gay. At the time, Harvard was not a welcoming environment towards the LGBTQ+ community. Being openly gay and also succeeding in the professional world was not something that Harrington felt he could do given the times and his situation. In 1979, Harrington took some time off from Harvard to realign himself, which entailed taking a half-year trip to Europe, before returning in 1981. He finally graduated in 1983 as a visual and environmental studies major.

After Harvard, Harrington spent three years working at The Coffee Connection in Cambridge, Massachusetts. Over the next few years, he dabbled in many artistic endeavors. In 1985, he met New York native Jay Funk and moved to the city the following year, although the relationship did not last much longer after the move.

== AIDS activism ==
=== Early activism and ACT UP ===
Harrington first became involved in HIV/AIDS activism after a close friend was diagnosed with HIV in 1988. His interests in social change and power dynamics, which he explored during his time at Harvard, led to him joining the AIDS activism group ACT UP. In 1990, Harrington found out that he was HIV-positive himself. As a member of ACT UP, he worked on the Treatment and Data Committee with Iris Long, Jim Eigo, and others. The committee was successful in expediting the approval of certain experimental AIDS drugs by the Food and Drug Administration (FDA). Much of Harrington's work centered on improving ACT UP's relations with public health agencies and AIDS research organizations. His efforts proved fruitful as he and others on his committee established a close relationship with the director of the NIAID, Anthony Fauci. Harrington and his counterparts who worked directly with scientists and researchers were well versed in academia and science so as to keep up with the health professionals they engaged with on a daily basis. In the late eighties, Fauci even proposed hiring Harrington, as he was "dazzled by his brilliance". As the relationships between certain members of ACT UP and officials within the government grew, there began to be infighting with other members of ACT UP.

In Let the Record Show: A Political History of ACT UP New York, 1987-1993, Sarah Schulman writes, "Scanning the interviews I conducted with a wide range and demographic of ACT UPers, the two names that emerge most often in reference to internal leadership are clearly Maxine Wolfe and Mark Harrington... These two were repeatedly named as profound influences." Schulman also writes, "These are the two people most often blamed with ACT UP's downfall and self-defeat, and the two most frequently named at the center of ACT UP's victories and strengths."

=== Treatment Action Group ===
Issues within ACT UP such as a divided organization, a lack of funding, and tension on how to best allocate time and resources ultimately led to a split in the organization. In response, Harrington along with 20 other members of ACT UP left the organization in 1992 to form their own group known as the Treatment Action Group, or TAG. To Harrington, the split did not represent a failure on ACT UP's part. Instead, it was a necessary and foreseeable event as the organization was not destined to last.

The foundational principles of TAG were to foster the relationships between activists and researchers (both public and private), serve as a watchdog for ethical practices, and support research that led to the best possible treatments. Harrington and his fellow founding members of TAG hoped for a new era to HIV/AIDS activism, and activism in general, in which the government was not an enemy but a partner. Harrington has said that the most important part to the work of TAG was to make researchers more aware of the needs of the people whom their research impacts, in this case people with HIV/AIDS, and for people to be more educated about the work of researchers, with TAG being the intermediary between the two.

The first major policy victory for Harrington and TAG was the report AIDS Research at the NIH: A Critical Review. Drafted in 1992 by Harrington and fellow TAG member Gregg Gonsalves, the report outlined certain suggestions the National Institutes of Health (NIH) should take to better allocate resources towards HIV/AIDS research. The NIH listened to these suggestions and incorporated them into the NIH Revitalization Act of 1993, signed into effect by President Bill Clinton. The act restructured and strengthened the NIH AIDS research program and created the Office of AIDS Research to oversee all forms of HIV/AIDS research in the United States.

In 1992, Harrington delivered his "Pathogenesis and Activism" speech at the Eighth International AIDS Conference in Amsterdam. There, Harrington promoted TAG's strategy of cooperation with the AIDS research establishment instead of confrontation. Along with this, he used his own HIV-infected lymph nodes to explain some of the mechanisms behind HIV and to urge other people with AIDS to take part in research trials. His speech also doubled as a public "coming out" as an HIV-positive person, which many were not aware of.

Other notable accomplishments for Harrington and TAG were the papers The Crisis in Clinical AIDS Research (1993), Rescuing Accelerated Approval: Moving Beyond the Status Quo (1994), and Problems with Protease Inhibitor Development Plans (1995). The first was his own paper which highlighted the poor standards in clinical trials conducted by the U.S. Department of Defense, the AIDS Clinical Trials Group (ACTG), and other organizations. The other two papers were significant during the development of protease inhibitors in the mid-1990s.

== Current work ==
Harrington has been involved in numerous boards, councils, and committees for the NIH, FDA, and World Health Organization (WHO). He was on the FDA Antiviral Drugs Advisory Committee and the NIH AIDS Research Program Evaluation Working Group. This group helped restructure the NIH again to better allocate resources for HIV/AIDS research.

In the late 1990s, Harrington began to focus his efforts on the global AIDS pandemic. After receiving the grant money from the MacArthur Fellows Program, colloquially called the "Genius Grant", in 1997, Harrington believed that it would be best served to help combat HIV infections in the countries that are most heavily impacted by the pandemic . Harrington and Gregg Gonsalves are the only two AIDS activists to receive a MacArthur Fellowship. The two worked together and were members of ACT UP and TAG.

In 2007, Harrington received a $4.7 million grant from the Bill and Melinda Gates Foundation which he used for expanding initiatives to educate AIDS activists in Africa on tuberculosis (a common AIDS-associated disease on the continent), and increase government intervention. His work on tuberculosis began in 2002, and continues to the present day.

Most recently, Harrington worked with the New York State Ending the Epidemic Task Force whose goal was to end AIDS in New York by 2020.

Harrington has written papers for journals such as The Lancet, Science and PLOS Medicine.

== Awards ==
- 1997 MacArthur Fellows Program
- 2007 Bill and Melinda Gates Foundation Grant

== Works ==
- AIDS Research at the NIH: A Critical Review with Gregg Gonsalves (Presented at VIII International Conference on AIDS, Amsterdam, the Netherlands, July 20, 1992)
- Pathogenesis and Activism (Presented at VIII International Conference on AIDS, Amsterdam, July 22, 1992)
- The Crisis in Clinical AIDS Research (December 1993)
- Rescuing Accelerated Approval: Moving Beyond the Status Quo with Spencer Cox, Dennis Davidson, Gregg Gonsalves, Carlton Hogan, and Rebecca Pringle Smith (A Report to the FDA Antiviral Drugs Advisory Committee in Silver Spring, Maryland on September 12–13, 1994)
- Problems with Protease Inhibitor Development Plans with David Barr, Spencer Cox, Gregg Gonsalves, Derek Link, Michael Ravitch, and Theo Smart (For the National Task Force on AIDS Drug Development in Washington, D.C. on February 23, 1995)
- AIDS Research Highlights from the 35th Interscience Conference on Antimicrobial Agents & Chemotherapy (ICAAC) with Michael Marco, Spencer Cox and Tim Horn (San Francisco, California on September 17–20, 1995)
- Position Paper on Accelerated Approval for INVIRASE Brand Saquinavir (November 7, 1995)
- Viral Load in Vancouver (A Report from the 11th International Conference on AIDS, Vancouver, British Columbia, on July 8–10, 1996)
- Access Versus Answers (1996)
- It's Time to Change the Standard of Care For People With AIDS (February 24, 1997)
- Notes from the Gallo Lab Meeting (September 19, 1998)
- "Hit HIV-1 hard, but only when necessary", Mike Harrington, Charles C.J. Carpenter M.D., The Lancet (355, 17 June 2000)
- "World Health Organization HIV Treatment Guidelines Evolve", The Body Winter 2010
