= Hilferty =

Hilferty is a surname. Notable people with the surname include:

- Daniel J. Hilferty (born 1956), American businessman
- Robert Hilferty (1959–2009), American journalist, filmmaker and AIDS activist
- Stephanie Hilferty (born 1985), American politician
- Susan Hilferty (born 1953), American costume designer
