= Diva TV (video collective) =

Activist group within ACT UP

DIVA TV was a gay and lesbian video activist collective founded in New York City in 1989. The name was an acronym for "Damned Interfering Video Activist Television". Founding members include: Robert Beck, Gregg Bordowitz, Jean Carlomusto, Rob Kurilla, Ray Navarro, Costa Pappas, George Plagianos, Catherine Saalfield, and Ellen Spiro.

== History ==
DIVA TV was an affinity group with ACT UP (AIDS Coalition to Unleash Power) and it preserved many of ACT UP's demonstrations, civil disobedience actions and public reaction to the group from the streets of New York as the AIDS crisis unfolded there. Members of DIVA TV identified themselves as partisan activists who created media in the same way participants in the Indymedia movement would fifteen years later—or in the same way Third World Newsreel did in the 1960s using earlier 8-mm film technology.

== Productions ==
In 1989, DIVA created three notable video productions: Target City Hall, about a 28 March 1989 ACT UP demonstration against New York City Mayor Ed Koch's inadequate response to the AIDS crisis, Pride on the 20th anniversary of the city's gay and lesbian pride movement, and Like A Prayer, five 7-minute perspectives on the ACT UP/WHAM (Women's Health Action Mobilization) 10 December 1989 demonstration at St. Patrick's Cathedral in New York to protest Cardinal John O'Connor's response to AIDS. Selected clips from DIVA TV's ACT-UP films can be viewed on their website. A videotape archive of their work can be viewed at the Lesbian Herstory Archives in Brooklyn, NY, and another is available at the New York Public Library, Manuscripts and Archives Division.

== See also ==
- James Wentzy, DIVA TV director/producer
