= Jean Carlomusto =

US filmmaker

Jean Carlomusto (born 1959, Queens, New York) is a New York filmmaker, AIDS activist, and interactive media artist. She produced and directed HBO's Emmy nominated documentary, Larry Kramer in Love & Anger, which was featured at the Sundance Film Festival. Her works have been exhibited internationally in festivals, museums and on television. She was an early pioneer in documenting the AIDS crisis. As the founder of the Multimedia Unit at Gay Men's Health Crisis, she created the television series Living with AIDS. She was a founding member of DIVA TV (a video affinity group of ACT UP) and a member of the Testing The Limits Video Collective.

== Education ==
Jean Carlomusto graduated from Sewanhaka High School in Floral Park, Queens, New York, in 1977. She earned her Bachelor of Fine Arts degree in film from C.W. Post in 1981. She earned her M.P.S. in Interactive Telecommunications from the Tisch School of the Arts at New York University.

== Career ==
Carlomusto has played a major role in media production for AIDS activists groups. Her AIDS activist work began in 1986, while working as a teaching assistant at New York University, assisting student teams in a class making educational videos for local organizations. When Joey Leonte from the Gay Men's Health Crisis came to her class to request a video, and none of the students wanted to work with him, the shame of her class' reaction drove Carlomusto to volunteer for the Gay Men's Health Crisis to increase awareness about AIDS and build empathy for those with the illness. She began as the projectionist for their safe sex workshops, then left her teaching job at NYU to start up the Multimedia Production Unit in order to produce a weekly television program called Living with AIDS. This was the longest running of the Gay Men's Health Crisis television series, with guest videographers including Marina Alvarez, Sarah Cawley, Ronald Dodd, Andres J. Figueroa, Laura Ganis, Alexandra Juhasz, Ray Navarro, Steven Okazaki, Catherine Saalfield, Kristin Thomas, and Paul Zakrzewski. These videographers not only made safe sex videos and educational films for healthy living with AIDS, but also gathered oral histories and interviews from diverse group of people suffering from the disease.

Carlomusto was part of the Woman's affinity group of ACT UP that focused on bringing visibility to how AIDS impacted women. In 1988, in response to an article by Dr Robert Gould in Cosmopolitan Magazine which said that straight women did not have to worry about AIDS, the Woman's Affinity group, including Rebecca Cole, Maxine Wolfe, Maria Maggenti and Denise Ribble, and Carlomusto organized a direct action against Cosmopolitan Magazine. They interviewed the author of that article, psychiatrist Robert Gould, who had made uninformed statements about women and AIDS.

In February 1987, Testing the Limits Collective founders Gregg Bordowitz and David Meieran filmed the first ACT UP demonstration at Wall Street. They met Jean Carlomusto at this demonstration, who was taping it for Living with AIDS. The filmmakers built up a rapport because they were among the few people at the event with non-professional video equipment. Carlomusto subsequently joined Testing the Limits Collective. Bordowitz and Meieran contacted Hilery Kipness who worked with Downtown Community Television, along with Sandra Elgear and Robyn Hutt from the Whitney program, and together they formed the Testing the Limits collective. This collective created Testing the Limits: New York City, the first direct action AIDS activist video. After working on this film together, Bordowitz joined Carlomusto at the Gay Men's Health Crisis, working together on the Living with AIDS series from 1988 to 1994.

Carlomusto, Bordowitz, Catherine Saalfield, Ray Navarro, Ellen Spiro, Costa Pappas, Robert Beck, Rob Kurilla, and George Plagianos went on to form DIVA TV in 1989. Standing for "Damned Interfering Video Activists", DIVA TV was an affinity group of ACT UP that created short direct action videos at demonstrations, as well as 160 video programs for public access television channels, including the weekly series "AIDS Community Television" from 1991 to 1996, and the weekly call-in public access series "ACT UP Live" from 1994 to 1996. Carlomusto participated in the creation of several early DIVA TV videos: Target City Hall, Like a Prayer (1991) and Pride.

In 1991, Jean Carlomusto joined Fierce Pussy, a lesbian art collective that produced AIDS-related art and media for ACT UP. In particular, Carlomusto focused on media geared toward lesbians to increase their awareness about the disease.

The cumulative work that Carlomusto had done throughout her AIDS activist career helped her produce independent documentaries on the topics of AIDS, lesbians, and LGBT history and culture. Her best known work include the documentaries L is for the Way You Look (1991); Shatzi is Dying (2000); Sex in an Epidemic (2011), and Larry Kramer: In Love and Anger (2015). Independent from her AIDS work, Carlomusto created the personal documentary To Catch a Glimpse (2007), which investigates the mysterious death of her grandmother.

Some of Carlomusto's work is now permanently housed in museums such as the Museum of Modern Art in New York, and has been exhibited in California, Sweden, and South Africa. Jean Carlomusto is currently director of the Television Center and professor in the Communication and Film Department at LIU Post Long Island University in Brookville, New York.

== Personal life ==
Carlomusto identifies as an Italian-American lesbian from a working-class background. She is a senior student at the Village Zendo in New York City. She is in a relationship with Lori Herbison.

== Publications ==
Carlomusto, J. (1989). "Making It: AIDS Activist Television." Video Guide, p. 18.

Carlomusto, J. (1992). "Focusing on Women." in ACT UP (ed.) Women, AIDS, and Activism, New York Women's and AIDS Book Group. Boston, MA: South End, pp. 215–218.

Carlomusto, J. (1992). "Preserving Desire". Felix: A Journal of Media Arts and Communication.

Carlomusto, J. & Bordowitz, G. (1992). "Do It! Safer Sex Porn for Girls and Boys Comes of Age." Conference paper in A. Klusaček and K. Morrison (Eds.) A Leap in the Dark: AIDS, Art, and Contemporary Cultures: 5th International Conference on AIDS. Montreal, Quebec, Canada.

Carlomusto, J. (2004). "Radiant Spaces: An Introduction to Emily Roysdon's Photographs." GLQ: A Journal of Gay and Lesbian Studies, 10 (4), pp. 671–679.

Carlomusto, J. (2013). "Archival Praxis." GLQ: A Journal of Gay and Lesbian Studies, 19 (4), p. 570.

Pidduck, J. (2009). "Queer Kinship and Ambivalence: Video Ethnographies by Jean Carlomusto and Richard Fung." GLQ: A Journal of Gay and Lesbian Studies, 15 (3), pp. 441–468.

== Exhibits ==
"To Catch a Glimpse", Permanent Collection, Museum of Modern Art, New York, N.Y. (2000–present).

"AIDS; A Living Archive", co-curated with Jane Rosett part of the exhibit ''Gay Men's Health Crisis: 20 Years Fighting for People with H.I.V./AIDS."Museum of the City of New York, New York, N.Y. (2001).

“Offerings,” Museums of World Culture, Goteborg, Sweden (2004/2005); Fowler Museum, University of California at Los Angeles, Los Angeles, California (2008); Durbin Art Gallery, Durbin, South Africa.

"Everyday", Co-curated with Alexandra Juhasz and Hugh Ryan for Visual AIDS, La Mama Galleria, New York, New York, (2016)

== Films ==
Testing the Limits: New York City (Testing the Limits Collective), 1987

L is for the Way You Look (1991).

Not Just Passing Through (1994).

Fast Trip, Long Drop (1994).

To Catch a Glimpse (1997).

Doctors, Liars, and Women: AIDS Activists Say No to Cosmo (1998).

Shatzi is Dying (2000).

Monte Cassino (2003).

[Sex in an Epidemic (2011).

How to Survive a Plague (2013).

Larry Kramer in Love and Anger (2015).

== Television ==
Living with AIDS, Gay Men's Health Crisis, 1986–1994.

AIDS Community Television (DIVA TV), ACT UP,1991-1996.

ACT UP Live, DIVA TV, ACT UP, 1994–1996.
