= Robert Hilferty =

American journalist (1959–2009)

- Born: December 14, 1959; Teaneck, New Jersey, US
- Died: July 24, 2009 (age 49); New York City, US
- Education: Princeton University
- Occupations: Filmmaker, journalist
- Employer: Bloomberg Television
- Known for: Stop the Church
- Spouse: Fabio Toblini

Robert Hilferty (December 14, 1959 – July 24, 2009) was an American journalist, filmmaker, and AIDS activist based in New York City.

== Career ==
Hilferty began his career in 1988 working as a production assistant for Robert Altman on The Caine Mutiny Court-Martial and Tanner '88.

Although he was HIV-negative, Hilferty became an AIDS activist following the death of his lover. He shot video footage at Act Up's December 1989 St. Patrick's Cathedral demonstration which he used to create the documentary Stop the Church. PBS initially planned to broadcast the film in August 1991 but then canceled the broadcast, citing the film's numerous denunciations of the Roman Catholic Church and calling it "inappropriate for distribution because of its pervasive tone of ridicule." Hilferty responded that PBS's decision was a "cowardly and unprincipled" form of censorship. Various local PBS stations, including New York's WNET, aired it in protest.

Hilferty followed Stop the Church with I Wrapped a Giant Condom Over Jesse Helms' House which documented a September 1991 demonstration by TAG, an activist group related to Act Up.

In 1991, Hilferty completed a screenplay, Comes to Shove which he described as "an action film" — a pun on Act Up's strategy of direct action, but the film was never produced.

In 1992, Hilferty obtained partial funding for Babbitt: Portrait of a Serial Composer, a documentary about composer Milton Babbitt with whom Hilferty had become acquainted during his years at Princeton. In 1993, Hilferty shot footage of Babbitt and conducted interviews with some of Babbitt's former students, including composer Stephen Sondheim, but did not complete the film. It was gently edited in 2010 by another former Babbitt student Laura Karpman, and presented on NPR online upon Babbitt's death in January 2011. Hilferty also served as cinematographer for the 1996 documentary I Was a Jewish Sex Worker.

From the mid-1990s until his death, Hilferty worked as a journalist for publications such as Artforum, Bloomberg News, Gramophone, New York Magazine, The New York Times, Opera News, Playbill, Stagebill and The Village Voice, writing about acting, architecture, classical music, fashion and gardening. While working for Bloomberg TV, he conducted on-camera interviews with Marisa Tomei, Mickey Rourke, Philip Roth, Renée Fleming, William Gibson and others.

== Personal life ==
Hilferty was born on December 14, 1959, in Teaneck and was raised in Weehawken, New Jersey. He attended Regis High School He majored in music at Princeton University, graduating in 1982.

Hilferty was a resident of New York City's East Village neighborhood for most of his adult life.

His companion in the early 1980s was film scholar Tom Hopkins who died of AIDS in 1985. His companion in 1988 was AIDS activist and writer Peter Staley who commented that although Robert was HIV-negative, "he helped me live and love without stigma." Hilferty's partner from 1995 until his death was costume designer Fabio Toblini.

Hilferty committed suicide on July 24, 2009, following complications from a concussion in March 2009.
