= Survive AIDS =

Survive AIDS is the group formerly known as ACT UP/Golden Gate. The group was founded on September four, 1990, by Brenda Lein and Matt Sharp. In 1990, the ACT UP chapter in San Francisco split into two chapters, the San Francisco chapter and the Golden Gate chapter. The catalyst for this was over decision-making processes, although it also involved many larger issues. According to ACT UP/Golden Gate, "ACT UP Golden Gate concentrated on issues involving treatment and treatment access while ACT UP San Francisco focused on broader social issues involving public policy and politics. Over the next several years the two ACT UP chapters worked separately and together on local and national AIDS issues." But in 1994, the two organizations stopped working together, and they grew further apart.

The AIDS Survival project writes, "By the late '90s, ACT UP San Francisco developed a very different philosophy concerning AIDS treatment and began to align itself with groups that believe HIV does not cause AIDS and that it is the use of anti-HIV medications which make people get sick and die. ACT UP San Francisco members are now called 'AIDS dissidents' because of views like these: antiretroviral drugs are harmful; safer sex is unnecessary; animal testing of medical therapies is unethical; HIV is not the cause of AIDS. "

In 2000, ACT UP/Golden Gate changed its name to Survive AIDS, to disavow any connection with ACT UP San Francisco. In their March 21, 2000 statement, they wrote: "Over time ACT UP San Francisco became controlled by individuals who had a different philosophy concerning AIDS treatment. This in itself was not a problem. The problem was that any one who disagreed with them on this one issue was shouted down, intimidated and driven out of the group. Long term members, seeing the original ACT UP mission and philosophy destroyed, were forced out of the group in disgust. The statement read, in part, "This new ACT UP San Francisco chapter harassed and stalked members of the AIDS community who disagreed with them about AIDS treatment strategy, first locally, then at national AIDS events. As time went on their tactics became more violent, culminating in physical assaults, which runs counter to the ACT UP philosophy of non-violent civil disobedience."
