= Prevention Point Philadelphia =

Public health organization

Coordinates: 39.9927°N 75.1196°W

- Abbreviation: PPP
- Formation: 1991
- Legal status: Non-profit
- Purpose: Syringe service programme
- Headquarters: 2913-2915 Kensington Avenue
- Location: Philadelphia, United States
- Region served: Pennsylvania
- Interim Lead Executive Officer: Silvana Mazzella
- Website: Prevention Point Philadelphia

Prevention Point Philadelphia (PPP) is a nonprofit public health organization providing harm reduction services to Philadelphia and the surrounding area. Prevention Point Philadelphia was founded by ACT UP Philadelphia, and began syringe exchange program which is also the first one in Philadelphia and Eastern Pennsylvania. Prevention Point Philadelphia provides harm reduction counseling, syringe exchange, medical care, support and education groups, and referrals to social services and drug treatment.

== About ==
=== History ===
Prevention Point Philadelphia was founded in 1991 based on acts of ACT UP in response to the HIV & AIDS epidemic. At the time, it was illegal to possess syringes in Pennsylvania. Under increasing pressure to respond to the growing epidemic, then Mayor Ed Rendell issued an executive authorizing distribution of syringes within the city.
