= Hunter Reynolds =

American visual artist and AIDS activist (1959–2022)

- Born: Hunter Wayne Reynolds; July 30, 1959; Rochester, Minnesota, U.S.
- Died: June 12, 2022 (aged 62); New York City, New York, U.S.
- Education: Otis College of Art and Design
- Occupations: Visual artist, AIDS activist
- Known for: Performance art, protest
- Awards: Guggenheim fellow (2017)

Hunter Wayne Reynolds (July 30, 1959–June 12, 2022) was an American visual artist, and AIDS activist. He was known for his performance art and protest, and he was an early member of the AIDS activism group ACT UP. In 1989, he co-founded ART + Positive. Charles Sanchez of POZ wrote "His work is profound, beautiful, at times startling and always ferociously honest."

== Biography ==
Hunter Wayne Reynolds was born on July 30, 1959, in Rochester, Minnesota. His parents were Danielle (née Dusseau) and Robert Reynolds. Around 1966 his parents divorced and he moved to Florida, followed by a move to California.

He attended Otis College of Art and Design (formerly Otis Art Institute of Parsons School of Design) and received a B.F.A. degree in 1984. After graduation he moved to New York City and founded ART + Positive, an ACT UP affinity group which protested for AIDS.

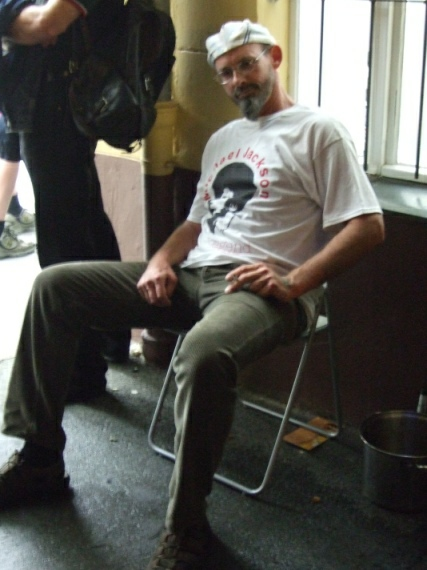
Hunter Reynolds (aka Patina du Prey; 1959 - 2022) am 18. Juli 2009 in Berlin

Around 1989 he was diagnosed with HIV. After his diagnosis he created a drag persona "Patina du Prey", who wore full ball gowns. It was through this persona he worked as a performance artist for many years. In 2017, he was a Guggenheim fellow.

Reynolds died of squamous cell carcinoma on June 12, 2022, in New York City, at the age of 62.
