= James Wentzy =

American film director

- Born: October 21, 1952 (age 72); Brookings, South Dakota, U.S.
- Occupation(s): AIDS activist Documentary filmmaker

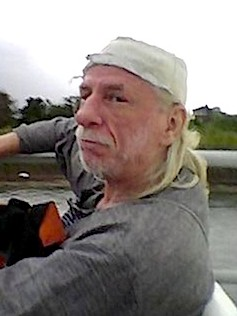
September 2010

James Wentzy is known as an AIDS activist and documentary filmmaker associated with ACT UP throughout the 1990s.

== Biography ==
Wentzy was born October 21, 1952, in Brookings, South Dakota, and moved to New York City after graduating the Southern Illinois University film program in 1976. Early on in his New York life Wentzy worked as a film cinematographer for the porn industry, then later as a printer for various photographers. In 1990 he was diagnosed with HIV. That year he joined ACT UP. His participation in ACT UP consists of angry, raw, and thorough coverage mostly consisting of unedited shots with addition of activist interviews who cover the topics discussed in the show.

He has been a producer and director for DIVA TV since 1991, and is also a video archivist for the Estate Project's AIDS Activist Video Preservation Project for the New York Public Library. Fight Back, Fight AIDS was his first feature-length documentary. Wentzy's goal within DIVA TV was to create a "national media network devoted to reflecting the struggles, needs and state of mind of people affected by AIDS."

He served as cinematographer on the 2012 documentary film about ACT UP, United in Anger: A History of ACT UP.

He is currently being shown at Los Angeles' MOCA (Museum of Contemporary Art).
