= ActUp/RI =

ActUp/RI, the Rhode Island chapter of ACT UP, the AIDS Coalition to Unleash Power, was formed in the spring of 1987, largely through the energies of Stephen Gendin, and continued as an active organization until 1993. Frequent targets of the group's demonstrations included the RI Department of Health, RI Project AIDS, and The Providence Journal.

ACT UP RI was re-formed in November 2011 and now meets monthly. It represented itself as a group of activists at ACT UP/NY’s 25th anniversary.

== Actions ==
=== Health Department sit-in ===
In the spring of 1987, ActUp/RI took the lead in planning a protest against the imposition of mandatory HIV testing planned by the RI Department of Health. Six members were arrested while occupying the office of H. Denman Scott, Director of the RI Department of Health, while dozens of supporters rallied outside with placards and chants. The effect of this and similar efforts was to substantially alter the legislation enabling mandatory HIV testing, by restricting its implementation to prison inmates (the original legislation had included provisions for testing all pregnant women, anyone admitted to a hospital, anyone seeking prenatal care or family planning services, and anyone seeking treatment for drug abuse).

=== Westminster Street die-in ===
Soon after the introduction of AZT to the market in October 1987, ACT UP groups around the country protested what they perceived as prices so high that most people with HIV would be unable to afford them. ActUp/RI staged a die-in outside the CVS store on Westminster Street in Downtown Providence in order to draw local media attention to the issue. Protests such as this were effective in pressuring the drug's maker, Burroughs Wellcome, to substantially reduce the price charged for AZT.

=== Ed DiPrete's bid for Governor of Rhode Island ===
Members of ActUp/RI disrupted the 1988 candidacy announcement of Ed DiPrete for Governor of Rhode Island in order to address what they felt was a lack of attention and resources being devoted by the State to AIDS treatment and HIV prevention. One year later, a subsequent demonstration called Lunch with the Governor was held on the State House grounds.

=== Providence Journal ===
The Providence Journal was targeted by ActUp/RI on several occasions. The largest demonstration involved circling the building with chanting protestors, and replacing the front page displayed in newspaper sales boxes with pages reading 'OUT OF ORDER' and various of the group's complaints. The Providence Journal was targeted by the group because they felt that the paper had editorial policies strongly slanted against the rights of people living with HIV, as shown by various editorial positions taken by Phil Terzian; and allowed vehemently homophobic letters (chiefly written by surgeon Warren Francis), while squelching letters written in support of people with AIDS.
