= Iris Long =

American chemist and HIV/AIDS activist (1934–2026)

- Born: Iris Lillian Doerr; December 8, 1933; New York City, U.S.
- Died: April 4, 2026 (aged 92); New York City, U.S.
- Education: Hunter College (B.A., M.A.); University of Connecticut (Ph.D.)
- Known for: HIV/AIDS activism
- Scientific career
- Fields: Organic chemistry, antiviral drugs
- Workplaces: Memorial Sloan Kettering Cancer Center; Long Island Jewish Medical Center
- Thesis: Lactones as Possible Carcinogens and Tumor Inhibitors (1972)
- Doctoral advisor: Robert E. Willette

Iris Lillian Doerr Long (December 8, 1933 – April 4, 2026) was an American chemist and activist in the AIDS Coalition to Unleash Power (ACT UP) effort to spread information about the possible antiviral drugs that could be used to combat HIV/AIDS.

== Early life and career ==
Iris Lillian Doerr was born in New York City on December 8, 1933. Her family was of German descent. At Hunter College, she completed a bachelor of arts in 1955 and a master of arts in chemistry in 1964. Long worked as an organic chemist in several research hospitals, including eleven years at Sloan-Kettering, there she worked on developing nucleosides - experience that would later help her understand the workings of antiretroviral drugs. She left Sloan-Kettering and earned her doctor of philosophy in 1972 at the University of Connecticut. Her dissertation was titled Lactones as Possible Carcinogens and Tumor Inhibitors. Long's doctoral advisor was Robert E. Willette. After her doctoral studies, Long worked briefly at Long Island Jewish Medical Center. She later ceased working professionally as a chemist, and was acting as a stay at home carer for her mother, who was unwell. It was during this time that she became aware of the AIDS crisis and the potential use of drugs similar to those she had worked on to treat it.

== Activism ==
Despite having no connection to the gay community, or HIV/AIDS sufferers, Long began to volunteer with the Community Research Initiative (CRI), distributing drugs that could possibly help against the virus to those infected. Many of the drugs being taken were anti-cancer drugs. However, around March 1987 she attended a meeting of ACT-UP and was struck by the group's approach. She brought the group information on a clinical trial carried out on HIV positive patients by the National Institute of Allergy and Infectious Diseases (NIAID) and was able to explain the types of drugs being used. This proved to be her greatest gift: explaining the complex range of drugs out there to the group. Following this she helped the Treatment and Data Committee to review medical information and report back to the larger group. She would go on to organize the AIDS Treatment Registry.

== Personal life and death ==
In 1970, she married Michael G. Long. Iris Long died in Astoria, Queens, on April 4, 2026, at the age of 92.

== See also ==
- List of AIDS activists
- Women in chemistry
