= Spencer Cox (activist) =

American AIDS activist (1968–2012)

- Born: March 10, 1968; Atlanta, Georgia, U.S.
- Died: December 18, 2012 (aged 44); New York City, U.S.
- Cause of death: AIDS-related causes, having stopped taking his medication
- Known for: ACT UP, Treatment Action Group, clinical trial design leading to approval of ritonavir

Patrick Spencer Cox (March 10, 1968 – December 18, 2012) was an American HIV/AIDS activist. He was involved in ACT UP and the Treatment Action Group during the height of the AIDS crisis in New York City. He helped facilitate the production of protease inhibitors, which revolutionized AIDS care in the 1990s.

== Biography ==
Cox was born in Atlanta, Georgia. He came out as gay while he was in high school. He attended Bennington College for three years, where he studied theater and literature. He moved to New York City in 1989, to pursue acting. He joined the AIDS activist group ACT UP that year and was soon thereafter diagnosed with HIV.

In 1992, Cox joined with other ACT UP members to form the Treatment Action Group, which worked to further treatment advances in HIV. He worked with the Food and Drug Administration's Anti-Viral Advisory Committee to hasten the approval time for new HIV medications, including the new drug class of protease inhibitors. Cox designed a clinical trial to examine the effectiveness of ritonavir, which led to its approval, which had a dramatic effect on the treatment of HIV.

Cox founded the Medius Institute for Gay Men's Health in 2006, concerned with issues faced by gay men, including loneliness, depression and substance abuse. With a lack of funding, Cox abandoned the effort and began using methamphetamine. He moved back to Atlanta to recuperate. He returned to New York in 2012, and appeared in the documentary film How to Survive a Plague. He also wrote for POZ.

Cox died at The Allen Hospital in Upper Manhattan, on December 18, 2012, of AIDS-related causes, after he stopped taking his HIV medications.

St. Luke's–Roosevelt Hospital Center (now Mount Sinai Morningside) renamed their HIV clinic, formerly the Center for Comprehensive Care, the Spencer Cox Center for Health, in June 2013.

== See also ==
- List of HIV-positive people
