= Treatment Action Group =

U.S.-based non-profit organization

Treatment Action Group (TAG) is a U.S.-based organization that has been prominent within the movement of HIV/AIDS activism. Being formed in 1991, it has possessed the goals of working with worldwide efforts to increase research on treatments for HIV and for deadly co-infections that affect individuals with HIV, such as hepatitis C and tuberculosis, as well as spur on greater access to and efficient usage of already available treatments. The group additionally monitors research on a possible HIV vaccine and on fundamental science aimed at understanding the pathogenesis of HIV/AIDS.

== History ==
The Treatment Action Group had its origins in the AIDS activist organization, ACT UP New York. In January 1992, members of the Treatment and Data Committee of ACT UP left the parent group to create a non-profit organization focused on accelerating treatment research.

During the early 1990s, TAG members, including Mark Harrington and Spencer Cox, advocated with government scientists, drug company researchers, and U.S. Food and Drug Administration officials to speed the development of new HIV therapies. The group produced an influential policy report on government investment in basic science, which recommended increasing funding to the National Institutes of Health (NIH) and reorganizing the national AIDS research effort.

Following approval of several effective antiretroviral drugs in 1995, Treatment Action Group pressed government and industry to conduct research to understand the long-term effects of the new drugs.

In 2002, TAG began raising awareness of the impact that tuberculosis (TB) was having on people with HIV in the developing world. In 2007, the organization received a $4.7 million grant from the Bill & Melinda Gates Foundation to foster increased international advocacy on TB/HIV research and treatment.

In 2020, Doctors Without Borders (MSF) stated that that price Cepheid Inc charged for its Xpert Xpress tests was not affordable in countries where people live on less than two dollars a day. They estimated that the cost to Cepheid of providing the test is as low as US$3, and called the offered US$19.80, price profiteering, asking that Cepheid make a more moderate profit by selling the tests for US$5 each. TAG seconded this request, saying that the development of the tests, and their purchase and global deployment, has been done with public funds, while the owners of Cepheid made profits of $3 billion in 2019. They requested the same price reduction for all the tests using the same technique, including COVID-19, HIV, TB, and hepatitis C, as the costs are similar regardless of the disease (the tests convert the RNA of the RNA virus into DNA, then tests for the presence of some DNA sequences). This request started the "Time for $5" campaign.

On June 20, 2024, MSF announced its Access To Medicines campaign is shutting down. TAG criticized the move by MSF in an open letter by Mark Harrington. The open letter declares: "The shuttering of the Access Campaign will have an extremely negative effect on the very populations whom MSF stands in solidarity.... We urge you to reverse the decision to close down the Access Campaign and engage with our communities to ensure continued collaboration."

== Mission statement ==
Treatment Action Group's mission statement describes the group as: "an independent AIDS research and policy think tank fighting for better treatment, a vaccine, and a cure for AIDS."

TAG works to ensure that all people with HIV receive life saving treatment, care, and information. We are science-based treatment activists working to expand and accelerate vital research and effective community engagement with research and policy institutions. TAG catalyzes open collective action by all affected communities, scientists, and policymakers to end AIDS.

== In the media ==
TAG's September 1991 demonstration at the home of Senator Jesse Helms was documented in Robert Hilferty's film I Wrapped a Giant Condom Over Jesse Helms' House.

The relationship between TAG and ACT UP is also discussed in the 2012 documentary How to Survive a Plague.
