= The Asianadian =

First Canadian magazine aimed at Asian Canadian people

- Discipline: Culture
- Language: English

Publication details
- History: 1978–1985
- Publisher: Asianadian Resource Workshop (Canada)
- Frequency: Quarterly

Standard abbreviations
- ISO 4: Asianadian

Indexing
- ISSN: 0705-8861

Links
- Journal homepage

The Asianadian was the first Canadian magazine aimed at Asian Canadian people. Created in Toronto, it ran for 24 issues which were published from 1978 to 1985. The magazine remains a significant part of Asian Canadian culture and the only inclusive Asian Canadian periodical to date.

In the beginning, the periodical was to be called Crossroads, and intended to be a Hong Kong News magazine written in Cantonese for Chinese and Hong Kong Canadians. Eventually the project evolved into the Asianadian after a conversation between the three founders at the Mars Restaurant in Toronto. The three founding members are Tony Chan, Cheuk Kwan, and Lau Bo.

== Stance and mandate ==
The goal of the magazine was to foster a sense of community, cultural identity and political consciousness within Asian Canadian communities. It aimed to address and represent experiences and issues faced by Asian Canadians.

The partial position of the magazine was unique in the way that it took a radically anti-oppressive position on topics pertaining to sex, sexual orientation, race, culture and more.

== Editorial content and notable works ==
The Asianadian covered a wide range of topics and featured essays on various subjects, including:

- Essays on being Gay, Lesbian, and Asian.
- The anti-W5 civil rights movement.
- Muslims in Canada.
- Asian Canadian views on Quebec.
- An interview with filmmaker Wang Wang.

== Legacy ==
Since 1985, no other periodical has filled the gap in the market for a serial made for Asian Canadians. Yet, The Asianadian has been the subject of dissertations and studies across Canada. The magazine is remembered as key publication for many Asian Canadian people who grew up in the time that the periodical was running. There is an existing wiki that contains archived copies of each issue.

=== Archives ===
The collection is found in the Toronto Public Library, the University of British Columbia, University of Toronto, and the University of Washington.

=== The Centre A Reading Room Presents: Revisiting The Asianadian ===
From February to May 2022, Hania Ilahi and Hau Yu Wong organized a presentation of the entire publication of The Asianadian.
