= Gregg Bordowitz =

US author, artist, activist, and professor

- Born: August 14, 1964 (age 62); Brooklyn, New York
- Education: School of Visual Arts, New York University
- Known for: Video art, Activism, Writing, Education
- Notable work: Fast Trip, Long Drop

Gregg Bordowitz (born August 14, 1964) is a writer, artist, and activist who worked as a professor in the Video, New Media, and Animation department at The School of the Art Institute of Chicago and the Whitney Museum Independent Study Program. He was appointed director of the Whitney Program in 2023.

== Biography ==
Gregg Bordowitz was born August 14, 1964, in Brooklyn, New York and grew up in Glen Oaks, Queens. In 1982, Bordowitz began his academic career at the School of Visual Arts, then studied at the Whitney Museum Independent Study Program from 1985 to 1986, and at New York University from 1986 to 1987. In 1987, Bordowitz dropped out of school to become a full-time video artist, guerilla TV director, and activist with the direct action advocacy group ACT UP. During this time, Bordowitz was central to the formation of the notable video activist collective, Testing the Limits, who produced work documenting AIDS activism that were distributed through television, museums, schools, and community centers. He also wrote prolifically on the topic of AIDS activism, contributing heavily to the 1987 "AIDS: Cultural Analysis/Cultural Activism" of the well-respected academic journal October. In 1988, Gregg Bordowitz tested positive for HIV and, as a result, came out as a homosexual man to his mother and stepfather. He left Testing the Limits (now a self-sufficient non-profit entity) to focus on a more 'guerilla' approach to documenting AIDS activism. In 1988, he met video artist Jean Carlomusto at a demonstration partnered with her to produce the Gay Men's Health Crisis (GMHC) cable TV show Living With AIDS, which ran regularly until 1994. In 1989, he, along with numerous other video activists, formed DIVA (Damned Interfering Video Activists), a partner organization to ACT UP, dedicated to accurately documenting the protests organized by ACT UP and providing an alternative representation of the AIDS activist movement than the one presented by the mainstream media.

In addition, Bordowitz positions documentary activism as central to challenging dominant media representation that dictate public understandings of both the AIDS epidemic and queerness. Testing the Limits, effectively a trailer for Fast Trip, Long Drop, demonstrates his belief in video as a political tool to challenge these representations. One of his analytical contributions, his 1994 essay “Picturing a Coalition,” Bordowitz argues that video is more than just a documentary; it is a means of building political alliances across identities and lived experiences. He calls video a “coalition-building medium,” due to its accessibility and pedagogical capacity. As he writes, “video activists must clarify situations, render relations, and clarify possibilities”. This connection becomes clearer through his discussion of ACT UP (AIDS Coalition to Increase Power), which he describes as a “diverse, non-partisan group, united in anger and committed to direct action to end the global AIDS epidemic”. Rather than fighting for space in dominant media, Bordowitz insisted on creating alternative modes of representation. Testing the Limits exemplifies this approach: in addition to his ‘guerilla’ style of compilation, it is set to “Living in Wartime”, a song by activist Michael Callen. Bordowitz explains that the interactions between music and image functioned as an organizing tool, using the structure of music television to produce new meaning. His goal, ultimately, was to use video to organize activist communities and to highlight where their lives and struggles intersect. “The single most important objective is to affirm the lives of people living with AIDS and the social relations those lives include”. Through video, Bordowitz sought to challenge dominant narratives and create space for coalition and connection.

In 1993, filled with despair at the decline of AIDS activism as well as his own diminishing chances of survival, Bordowitz produced one of his most famous pieces, the documentary/montage Fast Trip, Long Drop. In this video, Bordowitz addresses the public's reaction to and representation of the AIDS epidemic as well as his own fears, insecurities, and struggles related to the disease. Fast Trip, Long Drop provides a realistic counterpoint to the flood of representations of people "Surviving and Thriving" with AIDS through a collage of documentary footage, staged parody, and vintage film clips of activist protests executed by ACT UP. For the first time in an AIDS-related documentary, people with AIDS were shown reflecting and discussing their reality in the face of the ever-present fact of their mortality. As Bordowitz explains in his 1999 interview with the AIDS art forum Artery, "When I made 'Fast Trip, Long Drop,' I was tired of pretending for the sake of others that I would survive. I became preoccupied with the burdens that sick people bear on behalf of those around them who are well. I wanted to get a handle on despair and put it out there as a political problem. To be recognized and discussed. If we couldn't do this, then it all seemed like bullshit. I wanted an honest media produced in the interests of people living with AIDS." The film is centered around Bordowitz's life and relationships cultivated during this epidemic, which he achieves by discussing the reality of losing friends and the difficulty of living with AIDS. The film, along with many of his other works, has been shown in film festivals, museums, and on television ever since, with an extremely positive response.

From there, Bordowitz continued to address AIDS in his artwork, video work, and writing. He taught video art at the Academy of Fine Arts Vienna, Brown University, and School of the Art Institute of Chicago from 1995 to 2010, before being hired as a permanent professor at the School of the Art Institute of Chicago. He went on to found and direct the School of the Art Institute of Chicago's Low Residency MFA program. His works have been shown at the Solomon R. Guggenheim Museum, the Whitney Museum of American Art, and the Museum of Modern Art, as well as numerous film festivals.

Bordowitz lives in Brooklyn with his long-term partner, the artist Kristine Woods.

== Videography ==
- some aspects of a shared lifestyle (1986)
- Fast Trip, Long Drop (1993)
- A Cloud in Trousers (1995)
- The Suicide (1996)
- Habit (2001)

== Bibliography ==
- Drive: The AIDS Crisis Is Still Beginning (2002)
- The AIDS Crisis Is Ridiculous and Other Writings 1986–2003 (2004)
- Between Artists: Amy Sillman, Gregg Bordowitz (2007)
- Volition (2009)
- General Idea: Imagevirus (2010)

== A History of Sexuality Volume One by Michel Foucault: An Opera ==
In 2009, Gregg Bordowitz began collaboration with artist Paul Chan an opera adaptation of Michel Foucault’s History of Sexuality. They were commissioned by Viennese museum curator Achim Hochdörfer, and asked to stage a performance at the MUMOK. In 2010, they staged a 6-man performance written and directed by Bordowitz.
