= ACT UP =

International AIDS activism, direct action and advocacy group

AIDS Coalition to Unleash Power
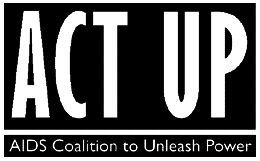
- Abbreviation: ACT UP
- Formation: March 12, 1987; 39 years ago
- Purpose: HIV/AIDS
- Key people: Larry Kramer
- Affiliations: ActUp/RI
- Website: actupny.com

AIDS Coalition to Unleash Power (ACT UP) is an international, grassroots political group working to end the AIDS pandemic. The group works to improve the lives of people with AIDS through direct action, medical research, treatment and advocacy, and working to change legislation and public policies.

ACT UP was formed on March 12, 1987, at the Lesbian and Gay Community Services Center in New York City. Co-founder Larry Kramer was asked to speak as part of a rotating speaker series, and his well-attended speech focused on action to fight AIDS. Kramer spoke out against the state of the Gay Men's Health Crisis (GMHC), which he perceived as politically impotent. Kramer had co-founded the GMHC but had resigned from its board of directors in 1983. According to Douglas Crimp, Kramer posed a question to the audience: "Do we want to start a new organization devoted to political action?" The answer was "a resounding yes." Approximately 300 people met two days later to form ACT UP.

At the Second National March on Washington for Lesbian and Gay Rights, in October 1987, ACT UP New York made their debut on the national stage, as an active and visible presence in both the march, the main rally, and at the civil disobedience at the United States Supreme Court Building the following day. Inspired by this new approach to radical, direct action, other participants in these events returned home to multiple cities and formed local ACT UP chapters in Boston, Chicago, Los Angeles, Rhode Island, San Francisco, Washington, D.C., and other locations. ACT UP spread internationally. In many countries separate movements arose based on the American model. For example, the famous gay rights activist Rosa von Praunheim co-founded ACT UP in Germany.

== Activists and Emotion work in ACT UP ==
Activists in the ACT UP movement had to rely on emotion work to create new order within the crowd. Emotion work is often associated with emotion management. Emotion work targets emotions that are often suppressed and transformed into emotions that can make real change because some emotions hold political difference and meaning based on what is being presented during protests or other forms of justice work. What goes unnoticed is that political strategies are merely seen as a way of performing. That means using the public in ways to manipulate and translate their emotions that were overlooked and example of these emotions would be grief and sadness and turning those emotions into "harsher" emotions that usually gain more attention because they are publicly controversial and spark more interest. This work usually goes unnoticed because it is ultimately not a visible or physical thing and by which many scholars try to look into this type of activist work and for this it is crucial to understand why many overlook this important aspect of movements.

Previous to 1987 lesbian and gay activist groups wanted to remain calm when protesting because they understood what it meant to go against respectability politics. For this they remained peaceful in fear of gaining a bad reputation. The emotion transition from using sadness and grief into anger caused controversies within many political advocates. Some stated that this might harm peoples reputation because ultimately the LGBTQ+ community is not viewed as being "normal" or fitting the status quo. People from the LGTBQ+ community are discounted because of their difference from straight society. Respectability politics often tends to have people conform to obeying the system and to think of themselves as less than because of their differences. A song used into these public spaces before transitioning emotions was "We are Gentle, Angry People" by Holly Near, this song tried to demonstrate that yes, they are also people, they have emotions, but proving to society that they are just like the rest of them. This leads to question whether anger has negative values or whether if only certain people can use this emotion to express themselves. Does anger make people move away from society because this emotion is seen as a publicly negative value to have or express?

When the public is in need, health officials and those who have stronger state power tend to either listen and react or listen and ignore. In 1988, U.S. Congressman Barney Frank criticised ACT UP for using angry tactics that he thought would "set them back," rather than criticising the people that were being affected with HIV/AIDS for advocating for themselves. This was thought to be a problem because being angry in public is an emotion that should happen in a private sphere. Homophobia played a big role when many people were fighting for survival over a disease they had no control over. Homophobia silenced the voices of the LGTBQ+ community while it simultaneously became a dessert with no one paying enough attention within the inside of greater institutions.

Many movements often first start off complying with peaceful protests because of media, especially if people are categorized as the "other" and are requiring basic needs, often leads to unequal treatment and alterations to what actually occurs within the movement itself. Earlier AIDS protests strategies included candlelight vigils and memorials, which emerged earlier in the 1980's, and the AIDS memorial quilt, which commemorated loved ones who had died from AIDS bu this demonstrated that they were too compliant. Millions of people continued to die and suffer the consequences of government neglency. After ACT UP formed, the members began to see these strategies that limited them with getting their message across as it did not confront those in higher power who were not making changes. ACT UP began to use the same "compliant" protesting tactics but with adding more emotions. A transition started to form when people began to use the quilt with all the names of loved ones who have died from AIDS, it was an approach to shame the government for the people they looked away from. An effective way that the government tried to move this issue away from them was to guilt trip the victim, the government refused to help and assist those in need by blaming them and saying this is their fault because they are having unprotected gay sex. The further complications entered the media by publicly announcing that this was something that specific community was dealing with.

Activists and members within ACT UP embraced more confrontational tactics that were intended to shock the public and make that revelation of uncomfortableness for real change. Some included the street marches with casket imitations to represent the bodies of loved ones that have died to AIDS. This representation helped to publicly demonstrate the life of loved ones that were lost. Even then these movements were still dismissed. There was anger and representation for their loved ones but there was still media and news shaming the LGBTQ+ community. Another emergent movement occurred in November 1992 where they held open casket funerals. These funerals aimed to represent the harmful truths that society tried to hide.

== ACT UP New York actions ==
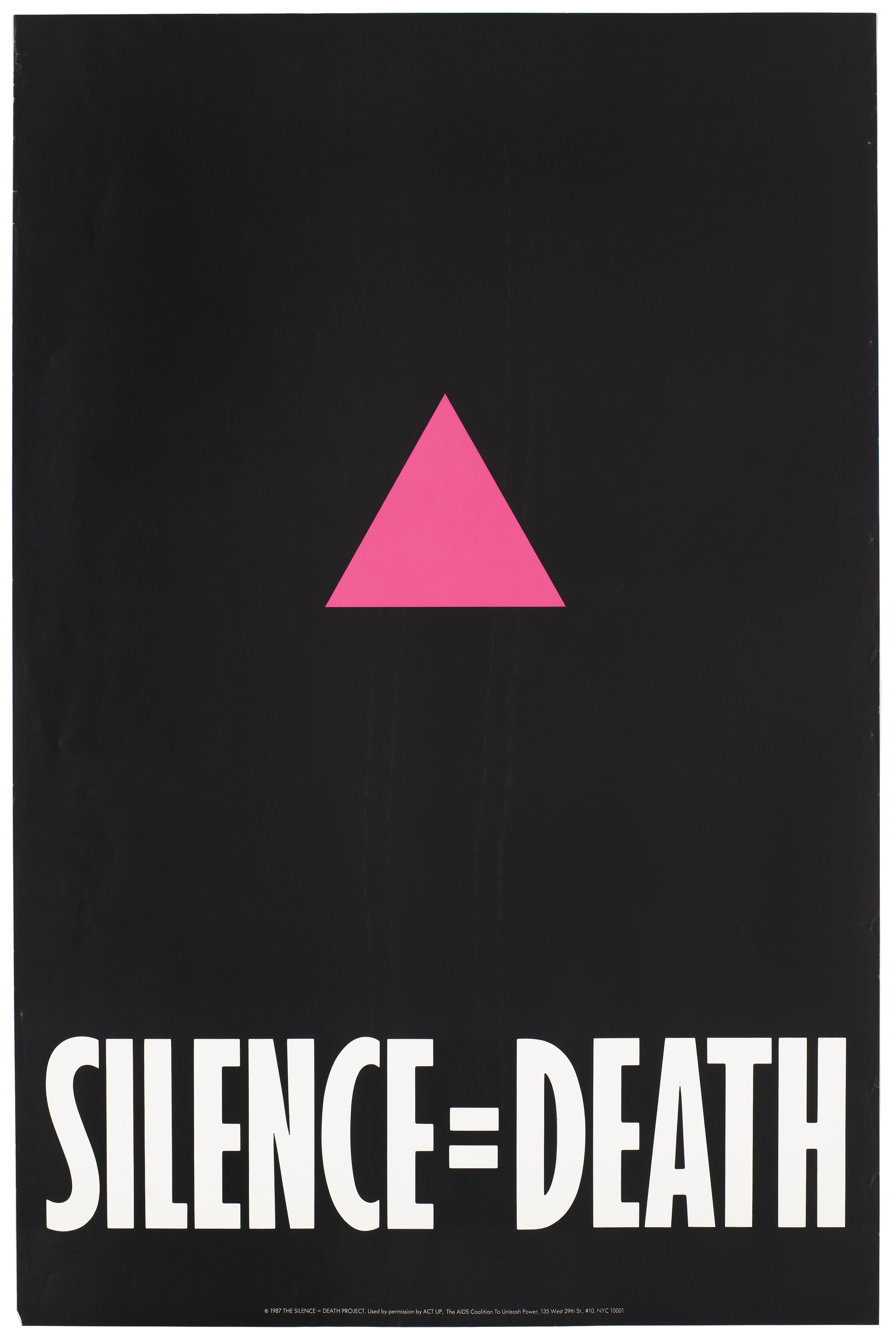
"Silence=Death" poster

Much of the documentation chronicling ACT UP's history is drawn from Douglas Crimp's history of ACT UP, the ACT UP Oral History Project, and the online Capsule History of ACT UP, New York.

=== Wall Street ===
On March 24, 1987, 250 ACT UP members demonstrated at Wall Street and Broadway to demand greater access to experimental AIDS drugs and for a coordinated national policy to fight the disease. An op-ed article by Larry Kramer published in The New York Times the previous day described some of the issues ACT UP was concerned with. Seventeen ACT UP members were arrested during this civil disobedience.

On March 24, 1988, ACT UP returned to Wall Street for a larger demonstration in which over 100 people were arrested.

On September 14, 1989, seven ACT UP members infiltrated the New York Stock Exchange and chained themselves to the VIP balcony to protest the high price of the only approved AIDS drug, AZT. The group displayed a banner that read, "SELL WELLCOME" referring to the pharmaceutical sponsor of AZT, Burroughs Wellcome, which had set a price of approximately $10,000 per patient per year for the drug, well out of reach of nearly all HIV positive persons. Several days following this demonstration, Burroughs Wellcome lowered the price of AZT to $6,400 per patient per year.

=== General Post Office ===
ACT UP held their next action at the New York City General Post Office on the night of April 15, 1987, to an audience of people filing last minute tax returns. This event also marked the beginning of the conflation of ACT UP with the Silence=Death Project, which created a poster consisting of a right side up pink triangle (an upside-down pink triangle was used to mark gays in Nazi concentration camps) on a black background with the text "SILENCE = DEATH." Douglas Crimp said this demonstration showed the "media savvy" of ACT UP because the television media "routinely do stories about down-to-the-wire tax return filers." As such, ACT UP was virtually guaranteed media coverage.

=== Cosmopolitan magazine ===
In January 1988, Cosmopolitan magazine published an article by Robert E. Gould, a psychiatrist, entitled "Reassuring News About AIDS: A Doctor Tells Why You May Not Be At Risk." The main contention of the article was that in unprotected vaginal sex between a man and a woman who both had "healthy genitals" the risk of HIV transmission was negligible, even if the male partner was infected. Women from ACT UP who had been having informal "dyke dinners" met with Gould in person, questioning him about several misleading facts (that penis to vagina transmission is impossible, for example) and questionable journalistic methods (no peer review, bibliographic information, failing to disclose that he was a psychiatrist and not a practitioner of internal medicine), and demanded a retraction and apology. When he refused, in the words of Maria Maggenti, they decided that they "had to shut down Cosmo." According to those who were involved in organizing the action, it was significant in that it was the first time the women in ACT UP organized separately from the main body of the group. Additionally, filming the action itself, the preparation and the aftermath were all consciously planned and resulted in a video short directed by Jean Carlomusto and Maria Maggenti, titled, "Doctor, Liars, and Women: AIDS Activists Say No To Cosmo." The action consisted of approximately 150 activists protesting in front of the Hearst Building (parent company of Cosmopolitan) chanting "Say no to Cosmo!" and holding signs with slogans such as "Yes, the Cosmo Girl CAN get AIDS!" Although the action did not result in any arrests, it brought significant television media attention to the controversy surrounding the article. Phil Donahue, Nightline, and a local talk show called "People Are Talking" all hosted discussions of the article. On the latter, two women, Chris Norwood and Denise Ribble took the stage after the host, Richard Bey, cut Norwood off during an exchange about whether heterosexual women are at risk from AIDS.

=== Women and the CDC's AIDS definition ===
Following their participation in the Cosmopolitan protest, ACT UP's Women's Caucus targeted the Center for Disease Control for its narrow definition of what constituted HIV/AIDS. While causes of HIV transmission, like unprotected vaginal or anal sex, were similar among both men and women, the symptoms of the virus varied greatly. As historian Jennifer Brier noted, "for men, full-blown AIDS often caused Kaposi's sarcoma, while women experienced bacterial pneumonia, pelvic inflammatory disease, and cervical cancer." Since the CDC's definition did not account for such symptoms as a result of AIDS, American women in the 1980s were often diagnosed with AIDS Related Complex (or ARC) or HIV. "In this process," Brier explained, "these women effectively were denied the Social Security benefits that men with AIDS had fought hard to secure, and won, in the late 1980s." In October 1990, attorney Theresa McGovern filed suit representing 19 New Yorkers who claimed they were unfairly denied disability benefits because of the CDC's narrow definition of AIDS. At an October 2, 1990, protest to raise attention for McGovern's lawsuit, two hundred ACT UP protesters gathered in Washington and chanted "How many more have to die before you say they qualify," and carried posters to the rally with the tagline "Women Don't Get AIDS/ They Just Die From It." The CDC's initial reaction to calls of the revising the AIDS definition included setting the threshold of AIDS for both men and women at a T cell count of under 200. However, McGovern dismissed this suggestion. "Lots of women who show up at hospitals don't get T cells taken. No one knows they have HIV. I knew how many of our clients were dying of AIDS and not counted." Rather, McGovern, along with the ACLU and the New Jersey Women and AIDS Network, called for adding fifteen conditions to the list of the CDC's surveillance case definition, which was eventually adopted in January 1993. Six months later, the Clinton administration revised federal criteria for evaluating HIV status and making it easier for women with AIDS to secure Social Security benefits. The Women's Caucus's role in altering the CDC's definition helped to not only drastically increase availability of federal benefits to American women, but helped uncover a more accurate number of HIV/AIDS infected women in the United States; "under the new model, the number of women with AIDS in the United States increased almost 50 percent."

Members of the ACT UP Women's Caucus collectively authored a handbook for two teach-ins held prior to the 1989 CDC demonstration, where ACT UP members learned about issues motivating the action. The handbook, edited by Maria Maggenti, formed the basis for the ACT UP/New York Women and AIDS Book Group's book titled Women, AIDS and Activism, edited by Cynthia Chris and Monica Pearl, and assembled by Marion Banzhaf, Kim Christensen, Alexis Danzig, Risa Denenberg, Zoe Leonard, Deb Levine, Rachel (Sam) Lurie, Catherine Saalfield (Gund), Polly Thistlethwaite, Judith Walker, and Brigitte Weil. The book was published in Spanish in 1993 titled La Mujer, el SIDA, y el Activismo. Members of the original Women and AIDS Handbook Group included Amy (Jamie) Bauer, Heidi Dorow, Ellen Neipris, Ann Northrop, Sydney Pokorney, Karen Ramspacher, Maxine Wolfe, and Brian Zabcik.

=== FDA ===
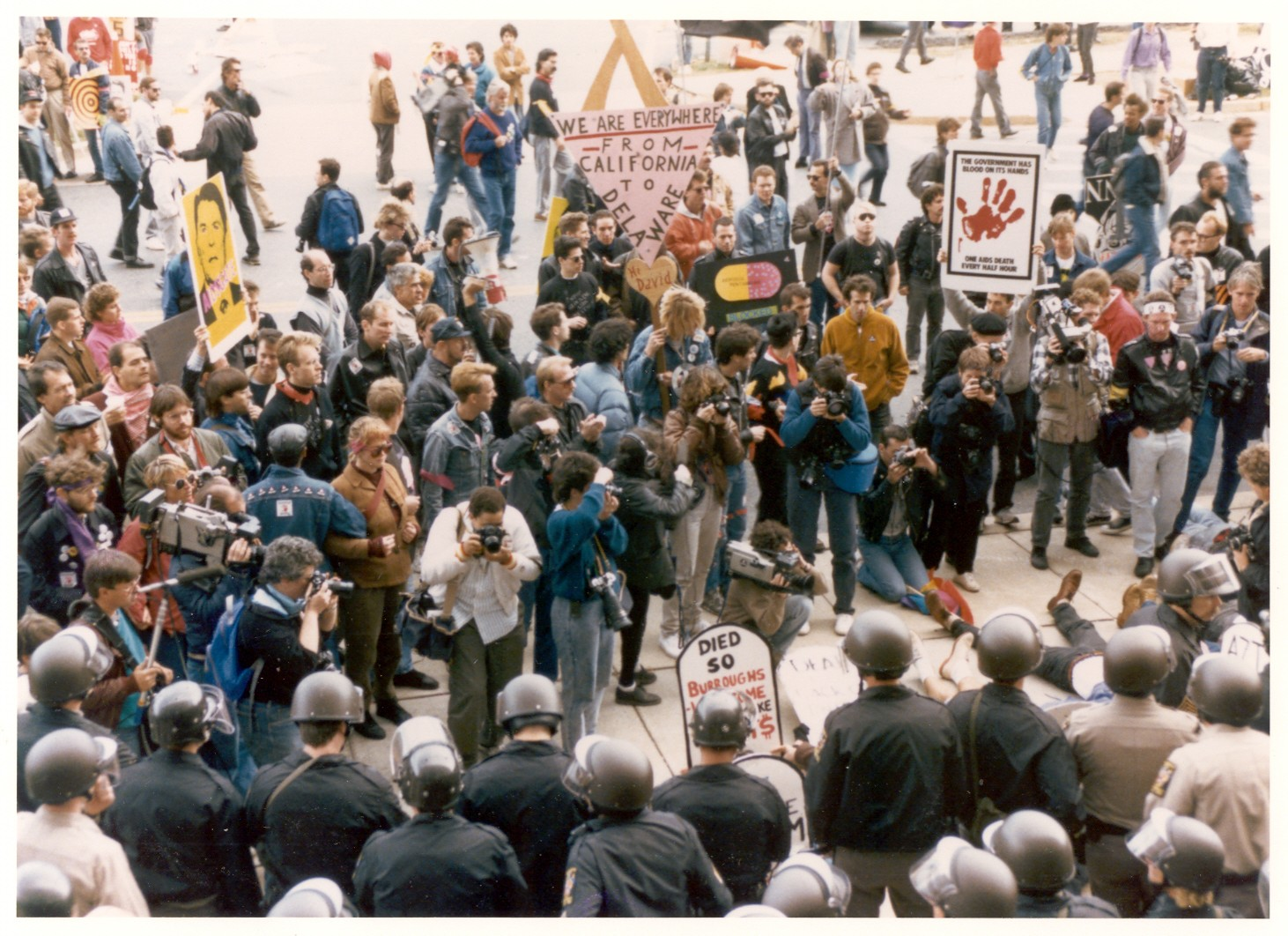
ACT UP demonstration at the FDA headquarters, 1988

On October 11, 1988, ACT UP had one of its most successful demonstrations (both in terms of size and national media coverage) when it successfully shut down the Food & Drug Administration (FDA) for a day. Media reported that it was the largest such demonstration since demonstrations against the Vietnam War.

The AIDS activists shut down the large facility by blocking doors, walkways and a road as FDA workers reported to work. Police told some workers to go home rather than wade through the throng.

"Hey, hey, FDA, how many people have you killed today?" chanted the crowd, estimated by protest organizers at between 1,100 and 1,500. The protesters hoisted a black banner that read "Federal Death Administration."

Police officers, wearing surgical gloves and helmets, started rounding up the hundreds of demonstrators and herding them into buses shortly after 8:30 a.m. Some protesters blocked the buses from leaving for 20 minutes.

Authorities arrested at least 120 protesters, and demonstration leaders said they were aiming for 300 arrests by day's end.

Among the protestors was artist David Wojnarowicz, then HIV/AIDS positive, wearing painted jean jacket that read: "If I die of AIDS—forget burial—just drop my body on the steps of the F.D.A."— a nascent meme. At this action, and via their campaigning in general, activists demonstrated their thorough knowledge of the FDA drug approval process. ACT UP presented precise demands for changes that would make experimental drugs available more quickly, and more fairly. "The success of SEIZE CONTROL OF THE FDA can perhaps best be measured by what ensued in the year following the action. Government agencies dealing with AIDS, particularly the FDA and NIH, began to listen to us, to include us in decision-making, even to ask for our input."

=== "Stop the Church" ===
ACT UP disagreed with Cardinal John Joseph O'Connor on the Roman Catholic Archdiocese's public stand against safe sex education in New York City Public Schools, condom distribution, the Cardinal's public condemnation of homosexuality, as well as the Church's opposition to abortion. This led to the first Stop the Church protest on December 10, 1989, at St. Patrick's Cathedral, New York.

Originally, the plan was just to be a "die-in" during the homily but it descended into "pandemonium." A few dozen activists interrupted Mass, chanted slogans, blew whistles, "kept up a banchee screech," chained themselves to pews, threw condoms in the air, waved their fists, and lay down in the aisles to stage a "die-in." While O'Connor went on with mass, activists stood up and announced why they were protesting. One protester, "in a gesture large enough for all to see," desecrated the Eucharist by spitting it out of his mouth, crumbling it into pieces, and dropping them to the floor.

One hundred and eleven protesters were arrested, including 43 inside the church. Some who refused to move had to be carried out of the church on stretchers. The protests were widely condemned by public and church officials, members of the public, the mainstream media, and some in the gay community.

=== Saint Vincent's Catholic Medical Center ===
In the 1980s, as the gay population of Greenwich Village and New York began succumbing to the AIDS virus, Saint Vincent's Catholic Medical Center established the first AIDS Ward on the East Coast and second only to one in San Francisco, and soon became "Ground Zero" for the AIDS-afflicted in NYC. The hospital "became synonymous" with care for AIDS patients in the 1980s, particularly poor gay men and drug users. It became one of the best hospitals in the state for AIDS care with a large research facility and dozens of doctors and nurses in its employ.

ACT UP protested the hospital one night in the 1980s due to its Catholic nature. They took over the emergency room and covered crucifixes with condoms. Their intent was both to raise awareness and offend Catholics. Instead of pressing charges, the sisters who ran the hospital decided to meet with the protesters to better understand their concerns.

=== Storm the NIH ===
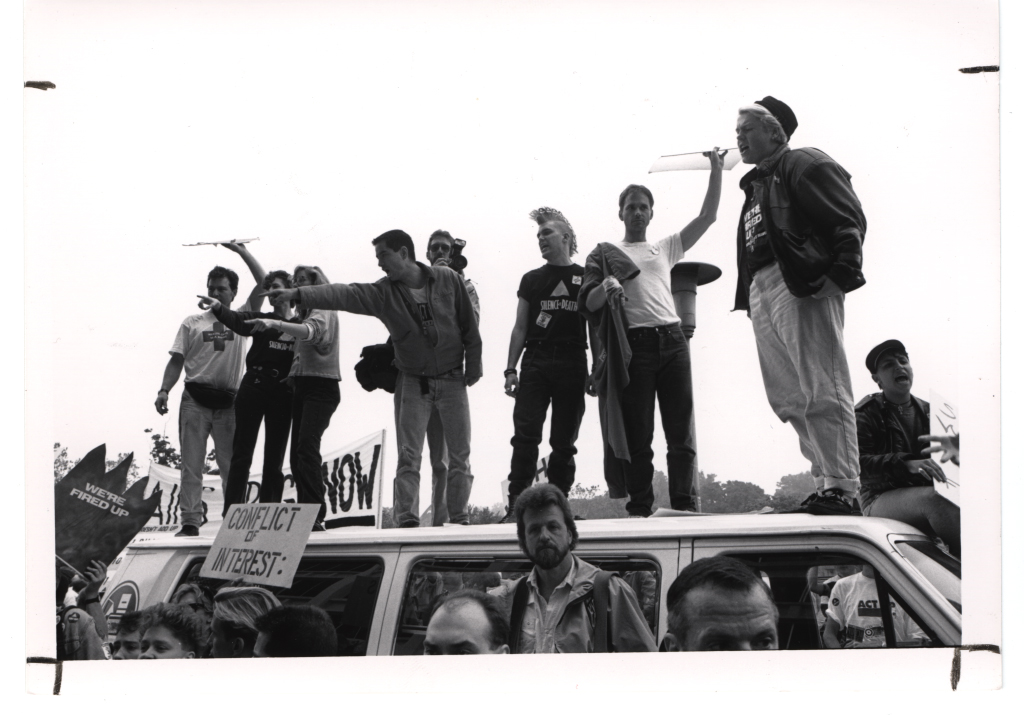
Demonstrators at the "Storm the NIH" Event

On May 21, 1990, around 1000 ACT UP members initiated a choreographed demonstration at the National Institutes of Health (NIH) in Bethesda, Maryland, splitting into sub-groups across the campus. The protest was in part directed at National Institute of Allergy and Infectious Disease and its director, Anthony Fauci. Activists were angered by what they felt was slow progress on promised research and treatment efforts. According to Kramer, this was their best demonstration, but was almost completely ignored by the media because of a large fire in Washington, D.C., on the same day.

=== Day of Desperation ===
On January 22, 1991, during Operation Desert Storm, ACT UP activist John Weir and two other activists entered the studio of the CBS Evening News at the beginning of the broadcast. They shouted "AIDS is news. Fight AIDS, not Arabs!" and Weir stepped in front of the camera before the control room cut to a commercial break. The same night ACT UP demonstrated at the studios of the MacNeil/Lehrer Newshour. The next day activists displayed banners in Grand Central Terminal that said "Money for AIDS, not for war" and "One AIDS death every 8 minutes." One of the banners was handheld and displayed across the train timetable and the other attached to bundles of balloons that lifted it up to the ceiling of the station's enormous main room. These actions were part of a coordinated protest called "Day of Desperation."

=== Seattle schools ===
In December 1991, ACT UP's Seattle chapter distributed over 500 safer-sex packets outside Seattle high schools. The packets contained a pamphlet titled "How to Fuck Safely," which was photographically illustrated and included two men performing fellatio. The Washington state legislature subsequently passed a "Harmful to Minors" law making it illegal to distribute sexually explicit material to underage persons.

=== Macy's Herald Square ===
On November 29, 1991, the Black Friday shopping day, ACT UP activists dressed in Santa Claus costumes chained themselves inside Macy's flagship Herald Square department store to protest the store's decision not to rehire an HIV-positive Santa, Mark Woodley. They sang protest Christmas songs with lyrics such as, "Santa Claus has HIV, fa-la-la-la-la-la-la-la-la/Macy's won't rehire he, fa-la-la-la-la-la-la-la-la." Nineteen activists were arrested at the action.

== Boston and New England ==
"In January 1988, [ACT UP/Boston] held its first protest at the Boston offices of the Department of Health and Human Services, regarding delays and red tape surrounding approval of AIDS treatment drugs. ACT UP/Boston's agenda included demands for a compassionate and comprehensive national policy on AIDS; a national emergency AIDS project; intensified drug testing, research, and treatment efforts; and a full-scale national educational program within reach of all. The organization held die-ins and sleep-ins, provided freshman orientation for Harvard Medical School students, negotiated successfully with a major pharmaceutical corporation, affected state and national AIDS policies, pressured health care insurers to provide coverage for people with AIDS, influenced the thinking of some of the nation's most influential researchers, served on the Massachusetts committee that created the nation's first online registry of clinical trials for AIDS treatments, distributed information and condoms to the congregation at Cardinal Bernard Francis Law's Confirmation Sunday services at Holy Cross Cathedral in Boston, and made aerosolized pentamidine an accessible treatment in New England."

In February 1988 ACT UP Boston, in collaboration with ACT UP New York, Mass ACT OUT, and Cure Aids Now demonstrated at both the Democratic and Republican presidential debates and primaries in New Hampshire, and at other events during the presidential race.

During an ordination of priests in Boston in 1990, ACT UP and the Massachusetts Coalition for Lesbian and Gay Civil Rights chanted and protested outside during the service. The protesters marched, chanted, blew whistles, and sounded airhorns to disrupt the ceremony. They also threw condoms at people as they left the ordination and were forced to stay back behind police and police barricades. One man was arrested. The demonstration was condemned by Leonard P. Zakim, among others.

== Los Angeles ==
ACT UP Los Angeles (ACT UP/LA) was founded December 4, 1987, and continued holding demonstrations until the early 2000s. During their run they tackled healthcare access, political issues related to LGBTQ civil rights, and supported national ACT UP campaigns.

Some of their more local work focused on policy regarding the migration of HIV-positive people into the U.S., pushing for AIDS clinical trials, promoting needle exchange programs for intravenous drug users, and surveying speaking out against discrimination by health care and insurance providers. They were effective in distributing their research on Antiviral Therapy (AZT), local and international actions, and updates on the different caucuses through their ACT UP/LA newsletter. The newsletter also served as both an educational outreach and fundraising tool.

Memorable actions by ACT UP/LA are the protests and demonstrations in county-based locations such as the USC county hospital, Los Angeles County Board of Supervisors, and the Los Angeles County Department of Health Services. ACT UP/LA and about fifteen other organizations formed an "Alternative Budget Coalition," rented the Los Angeles County Board of Supervisors' meeting room, and held a mock hearing on the county's $10+ billion budget, saying it spent too little on fighting AIDS. Prominent activists in this period included Connie Norman, one of the people who led ACT UP's push for a bill (AB101) to protect workers from being fired because of their sexuality, California governor Pete Wilson's veto of which led to the AB101 Veto Riot. ACT UP/LA and its associated Women's Caucus put on a “Week of Outrage” in conjunction with the national organization, which consisted of demonstrations, a teach-in, safe-sex vending event.

=== Women's Caucus ACT UP/LA ===
The Women's Caucus (WC) of ACT UP/LA served an important collaboration between men and women who were being affected by HIV and AIDS. WC within the ACT UP/LA organization was unique because in this chapter they had a significant amount of control over how they included women's issues into the organizations larger gay male actions. Men were present in the WC, but only as allies, which harvested a collaboration for effective actions, rallies, and any acts of resistance for the whole organization as a whole. While the collaboration was not always perfect, at the end it created a stronger force against discrimination of HIV+ people in Los Angeles.

Some of the work that the WC did was distribute statistical information about women who are HIV+, the lack of appropriate screening and health care access, information about safer sex practices (in English and Spanish), as well as acts of action to push for better. Lauren Leary was an integral in the organization because her work revolved around gathering existing research about HIV and AIDS in women and men and current treatment options. An ACT UP national collective of women came together to create the “Women's Treatment and Research Agenda” in 1991.

== Washington D.C. ==
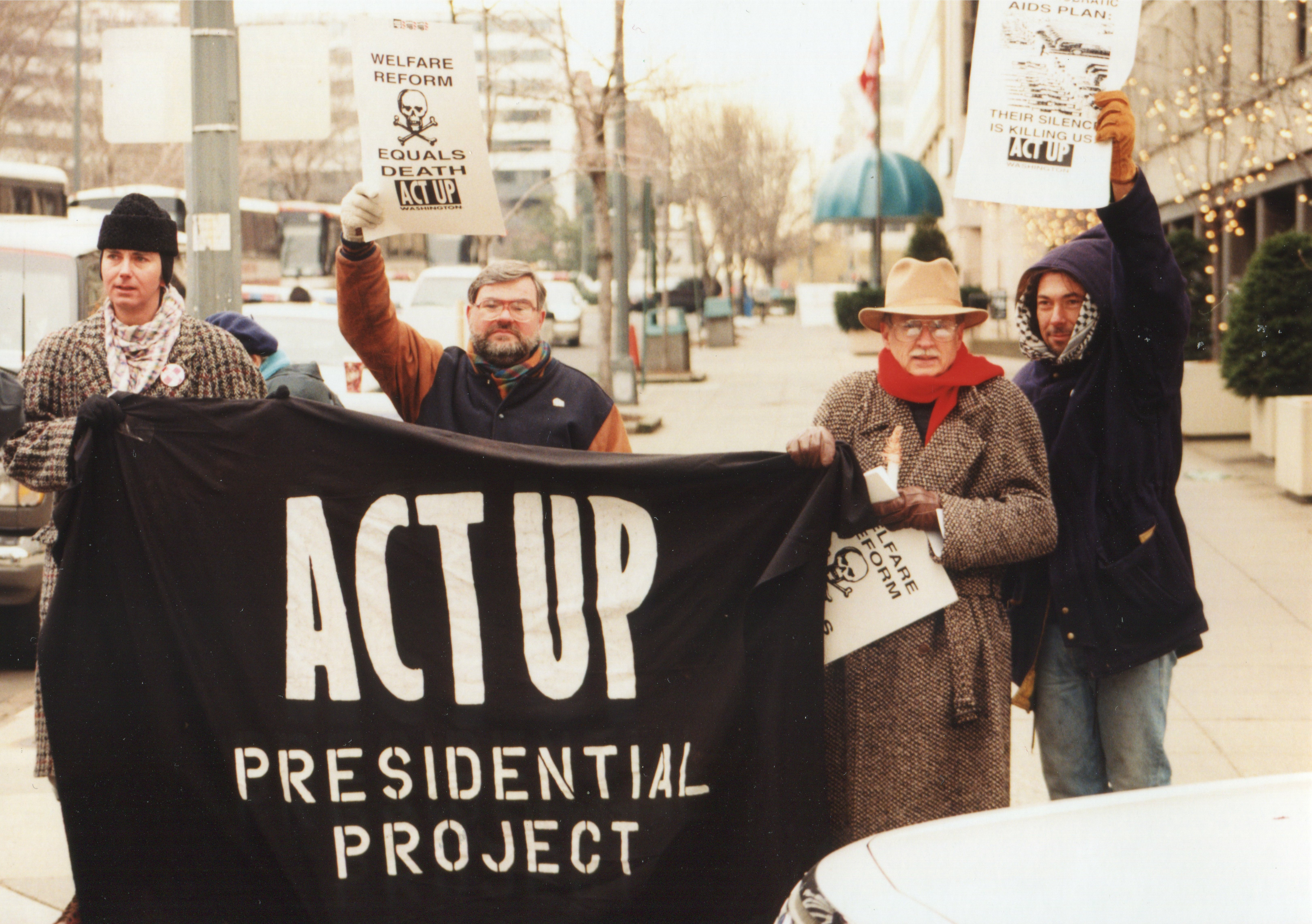
ACT UP demonstrate during the Second inauguration of Bill Clinton, in Washington D.C., January 20, 1997

=== Giant condom over Senator's home ===
Peter Staley and other activists affiliated with ACT-UP wrapped the Arlington, Virginia home of Senator Jesse Helms in a 15-foot condom on September 5, 1991. The protest condemned the Helms AIDS Amendments, which continued to block funding for education, as well as his ongoing opposition to People With AIDS, including numerous homophobic falsehoods about HIV and AIDS. Helms had actively passed laws stigmatizing the disease, and his staunch attempts to block federal funding for, and education about, HIV and AIDS had significantly increased the death toll. Some of the harmful legislation he enacted is still in place. The condom was inflated and the message on it read: "A CONDOM TO PREVENT UNSAFE POLITICS. HELMS IS DEADLIER THAN A VIRUS." The event was captured live on the news. This was the first action of the affinity ACT group TAG (Treatment Action Guerillas). While the police were called, no one was arrested, and the group was allowed to take the condom down, though they did receive a parking ticket. The event was dramatized, with fictionalized characters, in a 2019 episode of the FX television series POSE.

=== Ashes Actions ===
In October 1992 and October 1996, during displays of the NAMES Project AIDS Memorial Quilt and just before presidential elections, ACT UP activists held two Ashes Actions. Inspired by a passage in David Wojnarowicz's 1991 memoir Close to the Knives, these actions scattered the ashes of people who had died of AIDS, including Wojnarowicz and activist Connie Norman, on the White House lawn, in protest of the federal government's inadequate response to AIDS.

== Canada ==
=== Vancouver ===
Formed in 1989, ACT UP Vancouver began at a public meeting to determine how to respond to the government's inaction on the AIDS crisis, and focused their activism on the provincial political crises surrounding AIDS. The first ACT UP event took place in Robson Square as a public display of art in which three mummies wrapped in linen hung upside down to depict the inaction and neglect of the provincial government on those affected by AIDS. They organized and participated in various protests, including the Les Misérables at the Queen Elizabeth Theater. They protested against the Premier of British Columbia Bill Vander Zalm who was in favor of enacting quarantine legislation (Bill 34). There was a diverse range of activist groups from the community who protested against Bill 34, there were many members from ACT UP, support from the First Nations community, and politically left-leaning people. Despite its impact, the organization eventually dissolved around 1991, following their State of the Province protest. They stated their dissolution was not due to a lack of commitment from members, but rather a lack of expertise and negative press stemming from arrests, which led to other organizations distancing themselves from ACT UP. One of the arrested members, John Kozachenko, was accused of vehicle damage, though he asserted his innocence and the charges were later dropped. Members felt the incident interfered with the groups's ability to initiate reforms in conservative Vancouver.

=== Montreal ===
The AIDS crisis in Montreal was very pronounced and is often underrepresented in discussion about the pandemic. ACT UP worked to end the AIDS pandemic and to combat the extreme homophobia that gay men faced as a result of stigma and stereotypes. ACT UP NYC protested the Fifth International AIDS Conference in 1989 and inspired the creation of ACT UP MTL. They also confronted Montreal prisons about their high rates of HIV, which they suggested were due to condoms not being available to prisoners.

ACT UP MTL was formed in March 1990. Despite discouragement by the provincial government and Minister of Health, who felt that public information about AIDS prevention would encourage homosexuality and drug use, ACT UP MTL was responsible for translating English AIDS prevention resources into French and creating their own informational flyers that were accessible to Quebec's Francophone population. The chapter was also responsible for several demonstrations in a Montreal city park to raise awareness about those living with AIDS and those lost to HIV/AIDS complications. In 1994, the park was officially named Le Parc de l’Espoir and an AIDS memorial monument was constructed.

=== Halifax ===
The creation of ACT UP Halifax is credited to Dan Hart, an activist and leader of the queer movement in Halifax in the 1980s who even hosted many of ACT UP's events in his own home. While this branch of ACT UP is less known in comparison to the larger cities in the United States and Canada, it has made some notable actions during its time. On December 1st, 1990 a protest march was held on Barrington Street. What made this march different was the attendance of Pedro the Donkey, brought by the protestors to be used as a disruption method during the protest. Pedro held true to his purpose and refused to move when protesters were asked to vacate the street. This allowed Halifax's ACT UP group to peacefully protest while staying within the confines of the law.

== England and Scotland ==
=== London ===
Formed in January 1989, by Rob Archer and Rae Trewartha, ACT UP [London] was the first ACT UP chapter in Europe.

Its first action was at Wellcome's annual shareholder meeting, the parent company of Burroughs Wellcome, the makers of AZT, the first treatment that targeted HIV directly.

This was quickly followed by a protest at Pentonville Prison, where condoms were floated over the walls.

The next action was to highlight employment discrimination. It was at Texaco's UK headquarters. It was the first of a series of protests against Texaco. They later targeted YHA employment discrimination.

The next action blocked traffic at Elephant and Castle, South London's busiest road junction. It called on the government to end the 6-month delay for social security benefits for newly diagnosed people living with AIDS, and to improve the rate. A follow up in October, saw the first arrests in the UK. Three people were arrested including Kenny Lieske from Edinburgh ACT UP. In March 1990, members of ACT UP London chained themselves to the gates of Downing Street on budget day.

ACT UP London's last protest was a march in Kennington on World AIDS Day (1 December 1993). This was on cuts to social security benefits for disability benefits.

The group was revived by Dan Glass in 2014. The second incarnation came about to campaign for PreP to be made freely available on the NHS. Prep is a pill that if taken regularly prevents HIV infection and transmission.

=== Edinburgh ===
Formed in October 1989, by Kenny Lieske, Rob Archer and Tim Hopkins. Edinburgh had the highest number of HIV cases in Europe, most cases being among drug users.

Edinburgh ACT UP's first protest was on World AIDS Day 1989. After a march along Princes Street, it ended in a rally where balloons were released. One black balloon was released for each person who had died in Scotland, and one white balloon for each person alive living with AIDS.

Edinburgh ACT UP's next action was actually in London, inside Wellcome's annual shareholders' meeting a year after ACT UP London's protest. It got extensive positive coverage in the Scottish print media (before and after the action) and likewise with the English quality newspapers.

Edinburgh ACT UP's most successful campaign was to change how the government funded AIDS in Scotland. The AIDS budget was poorly allocated often not spent on AIDS services at all. The campaign was to target the funding where it was most needed prioritising regions with the most people with HIV. Edinburgh ACT UP's biggest protest blocked traffic outside of the Scottish Office. It attracted MPs and received extensive media coverage. Within a few months the government had capitulated.

=== Leeds ===
It was one of the more active groups in the UK. It successfully changed Leeds Hospital Fund's pay out policy to include people with AIDS. Other ACT UPs include Manchester, Glasgow and Norwich.

== Structure of ACT UP ==
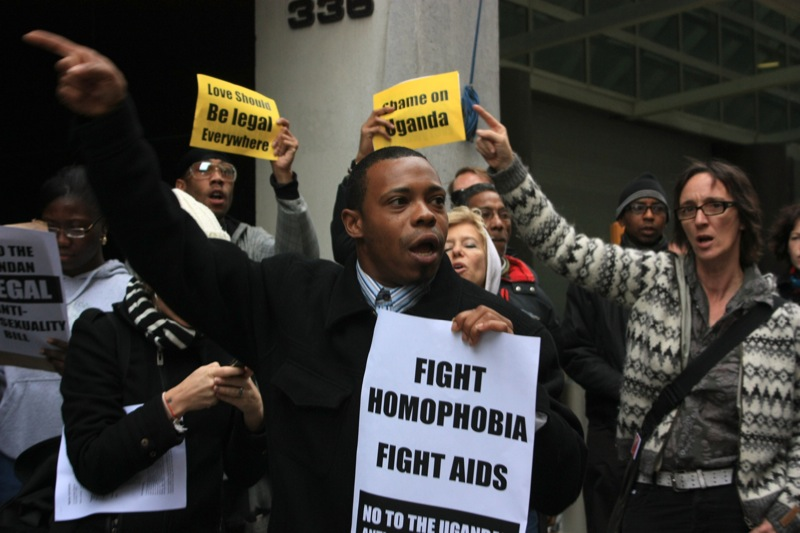
ACT UP protests in New York City against Uganda's Anti-Homosexuality Bill

ACT UP was organized as effectively leaderless; there was a formal committee structure. Bill Bahlman recalls there were initially two main committees. There was the Issues Committee that scrupulously studied the issues surrounding an advancement the group wanted to achieve and the Actions Committee that would plan a Zap or Demonstration to achieve that particular goal. This was intentional on Larry Kramer's part: he describes it as "democratic to a fault." It followed a committee structure with each committee reporting to a coordinating committee meeting once a week. Actions and proposals were generally brought to the coordinating committee and then to the floor for a vote, but this was not required - any motion could be brought to a vote at any time. Gregg Bordowitz, an early member, said of the process:

This is how grassroots, democratic politics work. To a certain extent, this is how democratic politics is supposed to work in general. You convince people of the validity of your ideas. You have to go out there and convince people.

This is not to say that it was in practice purely anarchic or democratic. Bordowitz and others admit that certain people were able to communicate and defend their ideas more effectively than others. Although Larry Kramer is often labeled the first "leader" of ACT UP, as the group matured, those people that regularly attended meetings and made their voice heard became conduits through which smaller "affinity groups" would present and organize their ideas. Leadership changed hands frequently and suddenly.

- Some of the Committees were:
  - Issues Committee
  - Action Committee
  - Finance Committee
  - Outreach Committee
  - Treatment and Data Committee
  - Media Committee
  - Graphics Committee
  - Housing Committee

Note: As ACT UP had no formal organizing plan, the titles of these committees are somewhat variable and some members remember them differently than others.

In addition to Committees, there were also Caucuses, bodies set up by members of particular communities to create space to pursue their needs. Among those active in the late 1980s and/or early 1990s were the Women's Caucus (sometimes referred to as the Women's Committee) and the Latino/Latina Caucus.

Along with committees and caucuses, ACT UP New York relied heavily on "affinity groups." These groups often had no formal structure, but were centered on specific advocacy issues and personal connections, often within larger committees. Affinity groups supported overall solidarity in larger, more complex political actions through the mutual support provided to members of the group. Affinity groups often organized to perform smaller actions within the scope of a larger political action, such as the "Day of Desperation," as well as when the Needle Exchange group presented NY City Health Department officials with thousands of used syringes they had collected through their exchange (contained in water cooler bottles).

=== Gran Fury ===
Gran Fury functioned as the anonymous art collective that produced all of the artistic media for ACT UP. The group remained anonymous because it allowed the collective to function as a cohesive unit without any one voice being singled out. The mission of the group was to bring an end to the AIDS Crisis by making reference to the issues plaguing society at large, especially homophobia and the lack of public investment in the AIDS epidemic, through bringing art works into the public sphere in order to reach the maximum audience. The group often faced censorship in their proceedings, including being rejected for public billboard space and being threatened with censorship in art exhibitions. When faced with this censorship, Gran Fury often posted their work illegally on the walls of the streets.

=== DIVA-TV ===
DIVA-TV, an acronym for "Damned Interfering Video Activist Television," was an affinity group within ACT UP that videotaped and documented AIDS activism. Its founding members are Catherine Gund, Ray Navarro, Ellen Spiro, Gregg Bordowitz, Robert Beck, Costa Pappas, Jean Carlomusto, Rob Kurilla, George Plagianos. One of their early works is "Like a Prayer" (1991), documenting the 1989 ACT UP protests at St. Patrick's Cathedral against New York Cardinal O'Connor's position on AIDS and contraception. In the video, Ray Navarro, an ACT UP/DIVA TV activist, serves as the narrator, dressed up as Jesus. The documentary aims to show mass media bias as it juxtaposes original protest footage with those images shown on the nightly news.

Although less as a "collective" after 1990, DIVA TV continued documenting (over 700 camera hours) the direct actions of ACT UP, activists, and the community responses to HIV/AIDS, producing over 160 video programs for public access television channels - as the weekly series "AIDS Community Television" from 1991 to 1996 and from 1994 to 96 the weekly call-in public access series "ACT UP Live"; film festival screenings; and continuing on-line documentation and streaming internet webcasts. The video activism of DIVA TV ultimately switched media in 1997 with the establishing and continuing development of the ACT UP (New York) website. The most recent DIVA TV-genre video program documenting the history and activism of ACT UP (New York) is the feature-length documentary: "Fight Back, Fight AIDS: 15 Years of ACT UP" (2002), screened at the Berlin Film Festival and exhibited worldwide. DIVA TV programs and camera-original videotapes are currently re-mastered, archived and preserved, and publicly accessible in the collection of the "AIDS Video Activist Video Preservation Project" at the New York Public Library.

=== Institutional independence ===
ACT UP had an early debate about whether to register the organization as a 501(c)(3) nonprofit in order to allow contributors tax exemptions. Eventually they decided against it, because as Maria Maggenti said, "they didn't want to have anything to do with the government." This kind of uncompromising ethos characterized the group in its early stages; eventually it led to a split between those in the group who wanted to remain wholly independent and those who saw opportunities for compromise and progress by "going inside [the institutions and systems they were fighting against]."

== Use of Holocaust imagery ==
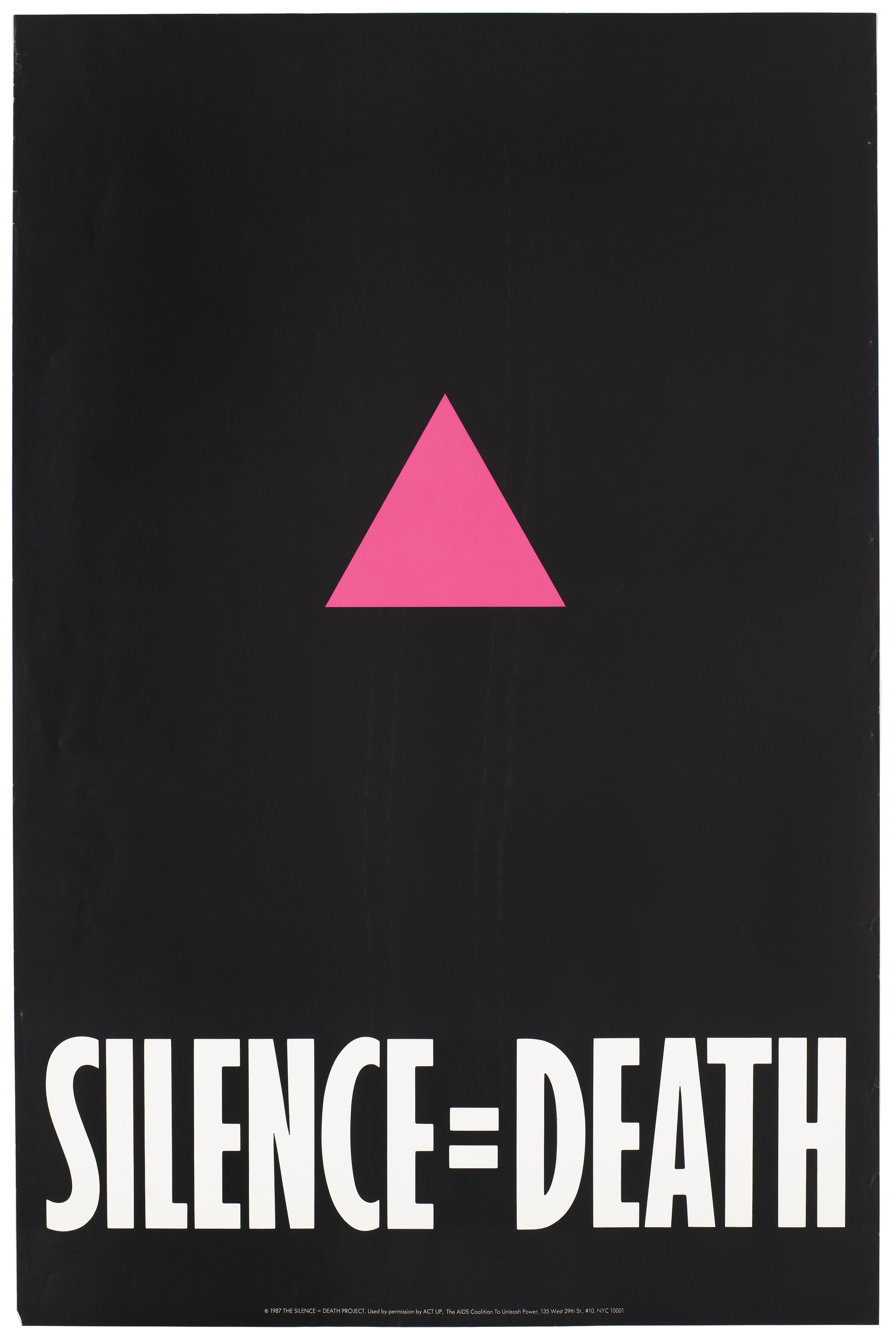
Poster of the Silence=Death Project, also used by ACT-UP

Shortly before the establishment of ACT UP, another group called Silence=Death Project designed the well known poster at right after being horrified by William F. Buckley Jr.'s call for HIV positive individuals to be tattooed.

ACT UP'S Larry Kramer also frequently invoked the AIDS-as-Holocaust trope. Kramer considered the lack of press coverage in American newspapers of the AIDS epidemic to be similar to its tepid response to the Holocaust. He also criticized some LGBTQ organizations, such as Gay Men's Health Crisis, for not being militant enough in the struggle against the AIDS epidemic; in Kramer's opinion, this was comparable to the reaction of the Judenräte, 'Jewish councils' set up by the Nazis, to the murder of their communities. Kramer believed that the slow pace of AIDS research was due to prejudice against the LGBTQ+ community and constituted genocide by neglect. Officials in the administration of Ronald Reagan were "equal to Hitler and his Nazi doctors performing their murderous experiments in the camps—not because of similar intentions, but because of similar results", and Anthony Fauci, leader of the National Institute of Allergy and Infectious Diseases, was comparable to Nazi war criminal Adolf Eichmann.

The AIDS-as-Holocaust metaphor was especially common in ACT UP-Paris, which was active in drawing parallels between a well known example of official indifference to mass death in a specific community (the Holocaust) and applied that to the perceived indifference of the government to the AIDS crisis, which affected marginalized groups. In 1987, the AIDS Coalition to Unleash Power (ACT UP) used the Nuremberg Trials as inspiration for political art in the front window display of the New Museum of Contemporary Art, then located in SoHo. The display, Let the Record Show . . . , depicted a reenacted image of the trials, "only with enablers of the AIDS crisis serving as defendants."

== Later years ==
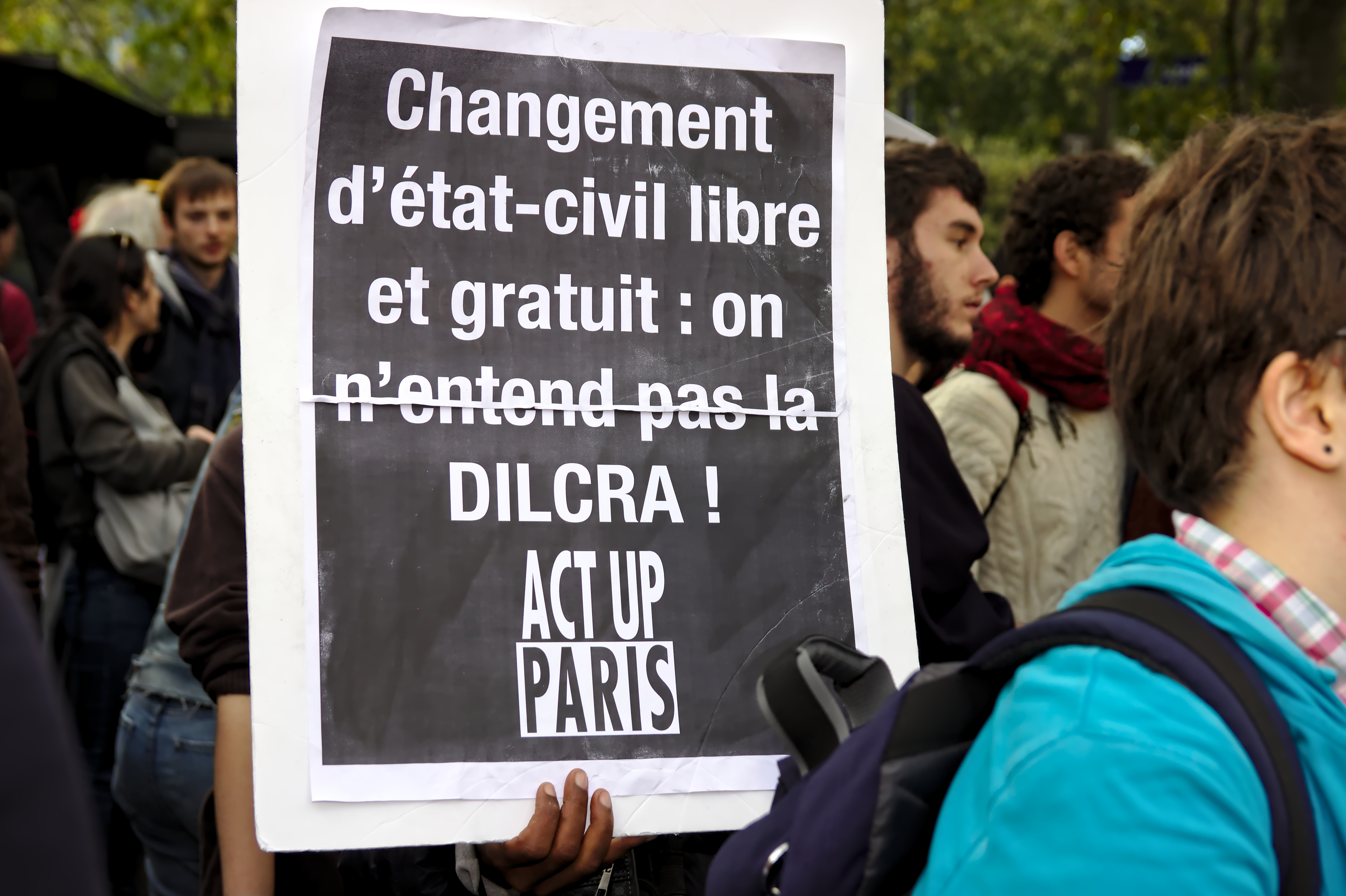
Change of civil status, free and liberated, ACTUP Paris, trans march, Paris 2017

ACT UP, while extremely prolific and certainly effective at its peak, suffered from extreme internal pressures over the direction of the group and of the AIDS crisis. After the action at NIH, these tensions resulted in an effective severing of the Action Committee and the Treatment and Data Committee, which reformed itself as the Treatment Action Group (TAG). Several members describe this as a "severing of the dual nature of ACT UP."

In 2000, ACT UP/Chicago was inducted into the Chicago Gay and Lesbian Hall of Fame.

ACT UP chapters continue to meet and protest, albeit with a smaller membership. ACT UP/NY and ACT UP/Philadelphia are particularly robust, with other chapters active elsewhere. Activists from this group started giving out syringes illegally as Prevention Point Philadelphia.

Housing Works, New York's largest AIDS service organization and Health GAP, which fights to expand treatment for people with AIDS throughout the world, are direct outgrowths of ACT UP.

Mattilda Bernstein Sycamore, who was a member of ACT UP San Francisco, is currently working on a new anthology of writing by current and former members of ACT UP chapters in the US and around the world, titled ACT UP Beyond New York: Stories and Strategies from a Movement to End the AIDS Crisis, which will be published by Haymarket Books.

== Factionalism in San Francisco ==
In 2000, ACT UP/Golden Gate changed its name to Survive AIDS, to avoid confusion with ACT UP/San Francisco (ACT UP/SF). The two had previously split apart in 1990, but continued to share the same essential philosophy. In 1994, ACT UP/SF began rejecting the scientific consensus regarding the cause of AIDS and the connection to HIV, and the two groups became openly hostile to each other, with mainstream gay and AIDS organizations also condemning ACT UP/SF. ACT UP/SF would link up with People For the Ethical Treatment of Animals (PETA) against animal research into AIDS cures. Restraining orders have been granted after ACT UP/SF members physically attacked AIDS charities that help HIV-positive patients, and activists associated with the chapter have been found guilty of misdemeanor charges laid after threatening phone calls to journalists and public health officials.

== See also ==
=== Organizations ===
- ActUp/RI: the Rhode Island chapter
- Bash Back!: group of "radical queers" influenced by ACT UP
- Fed Up Queers: group founded through ACT UP
- Fierce Pussy: NYC lesbian feminist art collective involved with ACT UP promotion and AIDS awareness
- Gran Fury: AIDS activist artist collective associated with ACT UP
- Housing Works
- Lesbian Avengers
- Queer Nation: group founded after meetings between members of ACT UP NYC and MassActOut

=== People ===
- Chris Bartlett (activist): member of ACT UP Philadelphia.
- J. Quinn Brisben
- Spencer Cox: member of ACT UP New York
- David B. Feinberg
- Avram Finkelstein: founding member of ACT UP New York and co-founder of Silence=Death Project
- Gregg Gonsalves
- Keith Haring
- Marsha P. Johnson: Stonewall veteran, participant in meetings and actions with ACT UP New York, Boston, MassActOut, and what would become the ACT UP Presidential Project in New Hampshire
- Larry Kramer: playwright, founding member of Gay Men's Health Crisis, early member of ACT UP New York
- Kiyoshi Kuromiya: member of ACT UP Philadelphia
- Didier Lestrade: ACT UP Paris co-founder
- Luke Montgomery: member of ACT UP Seattle
- Maria Maggenti: member of ACT UP New York, filmmaker and documentarian, director of The Incredibly True Adventure of Two Girls in Love, participant in the ACT UP Oral History Project
- Mary Patten: member of ACT UP Chicago
- Michael Petrelis: co-founding member of ACT UP New York, helped organize chapters in several cities nationwide, including the ACT UP Presidential Project; founding member of Queer Nation
- Hunter Reynolds: member of ACT UP New York, co-founded ART + Positive
- Thierry Schaffauser: sex worker activist and writer, former member of ACT UP Paris
- Sarah Schulman: member of ACT UP New York, director of the ACT UP Oral History Project
- Peter Staley: member of ACT UP New York, founder of Treatment Action Group (TAG)
- Peter Tatchell: helped found ACT UP London
- Shatzi Weisberger: member of ACT UP New York

=== Media and research ===
- How to Survive a Plague: documentary, 2012
- United in Anger: A History of ACT UP: documentary, 2012
- BPM (Beats per Minute): film (about ACT UP Paris), 2017
- Let the Record Show: A Political History of ACT UP New York, 1987-1993, book by Sarah Schulman, 2020

== Works cited ==
- ACT UP/New York Women and AIDS Book Group (1990). "Women, AIDS, and Activism." South End Press.
- ACT UP/New York Women and AIDS Book Group (1993). "La Mujer, el SIDA, y el Activismo." South End Press.
- Brier, Jennifer (2009). "Infectious Ideas: U.S. Political Responses to the AIDS Crisis." University of North Carolina Press.
- Caron, David (2010). "Tactful Encounters: AIDS, the Holocaust, and the Problematics of Bearing Witness". Yale French Studies (118/119): 155–173. JSTOR 41337085.
- Epstein, Steven (1997). "Specificities: AIDS Activism and the Retreat from the 'Genocide' Frame". Social Identities. 3 (3): 415–438. doi:10.1080/13504639751998.
- Faderman, Lillian (2015). The Gay Revolution. Simon & Schuster. ISBN 9781451694130.
- Goshert, John Charles (2005). "The Aporia of AIDS and/as Holocaust". Shofar. 23 (3): 48–70. doi:10.1353/sho.2005.0103. JSTOR 42943839. S2CID 143491596.
- Laurence, Leslie (1997). "Outrageous Practices: How Gender Bias Threatens Women's Health." Rutgers University Press.
- Parussa, Sergio (2001). "Literature in Question: Figuring Auschwitz and Redefining Literature in Post-Holocaust Theatre". Annali d'Italianistica. 19: 235–244. JSTOR 24008635.
