= Rooms by the Sea =

1951 painting by Edward Hopper

- Artist: Edward Hopper
- Year: 1951
- Medium: oil paint, canvas
- Location: Yale University Art Gallery
- Accession: 1961.18.29

Rooms by the Sea is a 1951 painting by American realist Edward Hopper. It is a late period painting completed in the fall at his Cape Cod summer home and studio in South Truro, Massachusetts. The work depicts an empty room with a door opening to the sea, letting sunlight into that room and another room behind it. It is the first of two paintings with the shared theme of an empty room without people but filled with light, followed by Sun in an Empty Room (1963). Although Hopper adamantly rejected the characterization, art critics have noted elements of abstract art and surrealism in the work.

== Background ==
Edward Hopper (1882–1967) first became interested in painting sunlight after seeing the work of the Impressionists during his trips to Europe from 1906 to 1907. An early example of Hopper's focus on sunlight is Trees in Sunlight, Parc de Saint-Cloud (1907). Beginning in the 1930s and continuing for the rest of his life, Hopper's approach to art solidified and remained mostly unchanged. In late 1950, Hopper was invited to serve as chairman of the jury for the upcoming biennial group exhibition at the Corcoran Gallery of Art, along with Lloyd Goodrich and Macgill James. In this role, Hopper composed a foreword for the catalogue, in what art historian Gail Levin describes as Hopper's "longest formal statement of aesthetics since the 1930s, laying out a rationale for representational painting just when Abstract Expressionism was increasingly capturing the public's imagination."

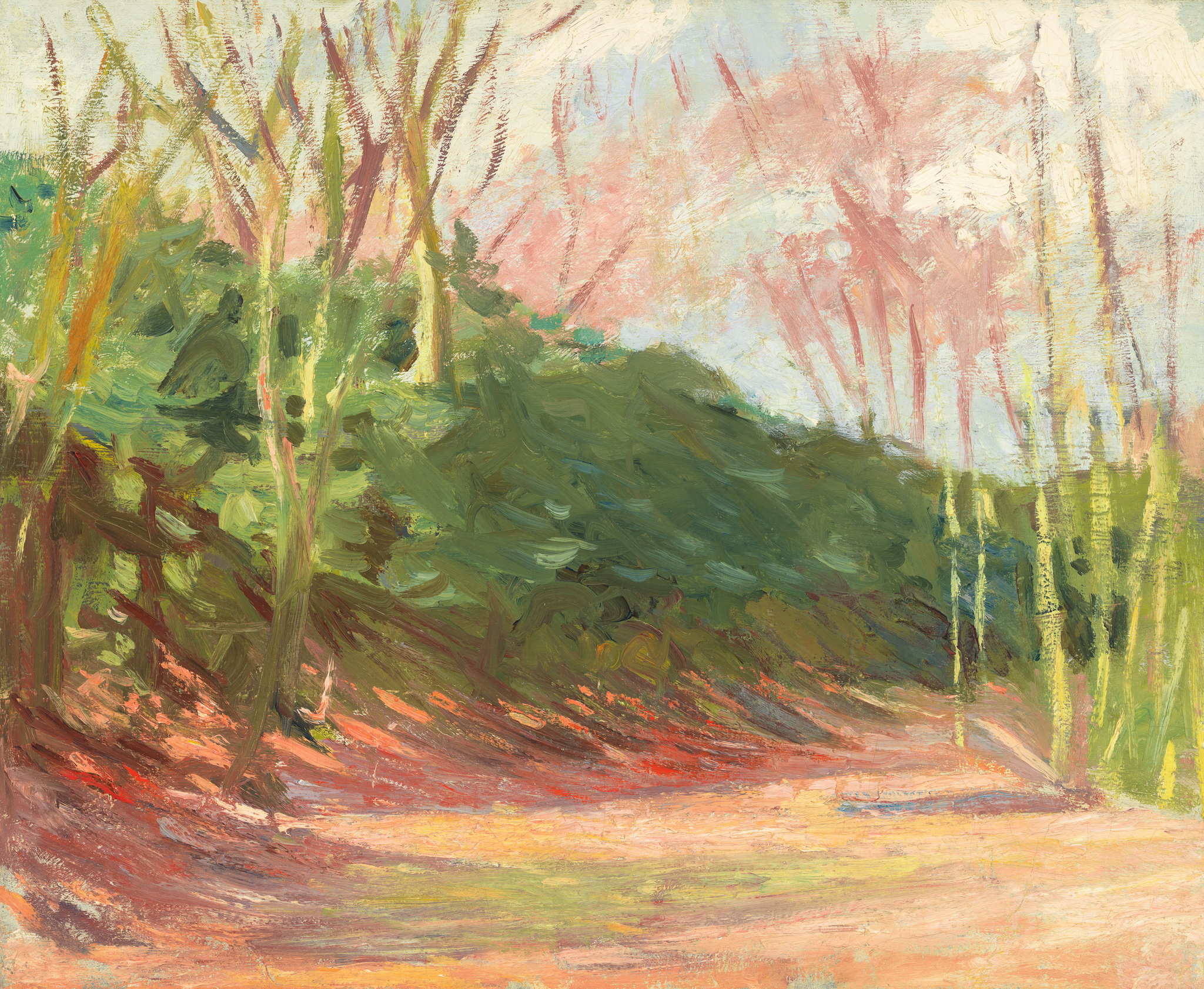
Hopper's Trees in Sunlight, Parc de Saint-Cloud (1907)

Soon after, Hopper began working on First Row Orchestra, a painting based on a visit to a New York theater, in January of 1951. By late spring, from March to May, both Hopper and his wife Josephine Hopper (Jo) were not working on any new paintings, so they packed up their automobile and drove from Manhattan to Saltillo, the capital of the Mexican state of Coahuila. (Instead of sailing to Europe for vacations – Hopper worried about getting seasick – the Hoppers had been in the habit of driving to Mexico; during a similar trip eight years earlier, Hopper painted Saltillo Mansion.) But a heat wave and bad storm made painting impossible in Saltillo, so they left for Santa Fe, New Mexico. Jo wrote in her diary that they could have stopped en route to visit with Mabel Dodge – known for her avant-garde salon – but Edward did not want to become indebted to her. They headed for Las Vegas, then back to Colorado, and then finally back to their New York home in Greenwich Village.

== Development ==
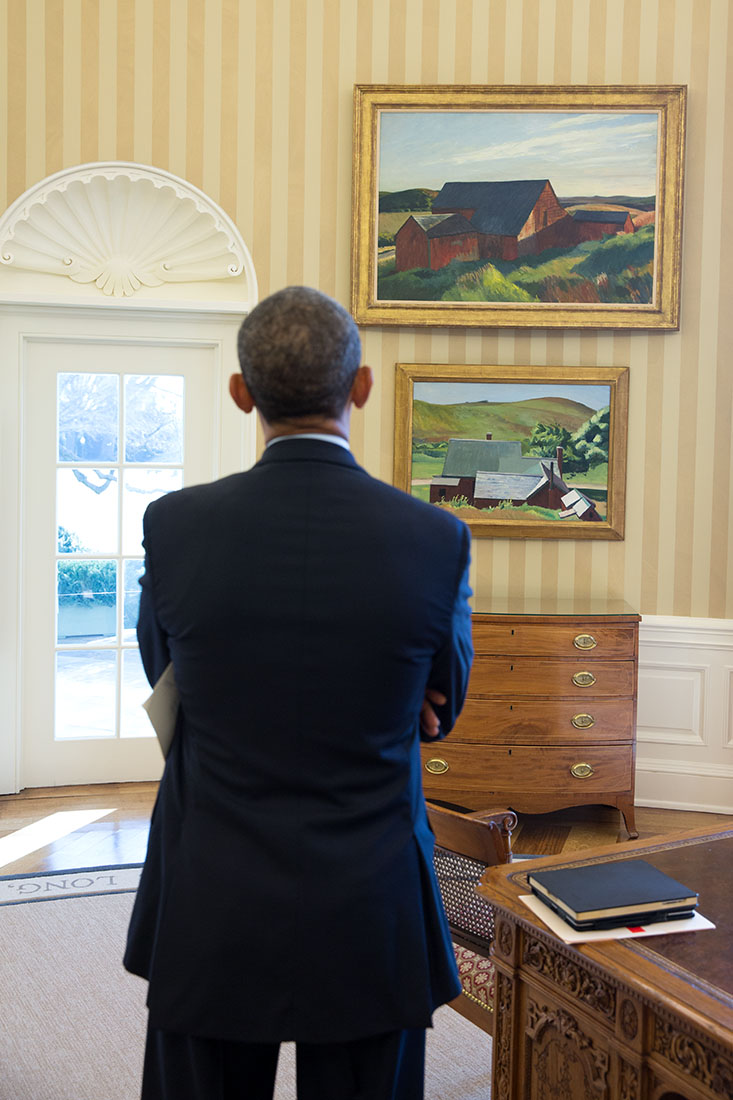
US president Barack Obama in the Oval Office (2014) with two of Hopper's 1930s South Truro works, Cobb's Barns (upper) and Burly Cobb's House

Since 1930, Hopper and Jo had spent every summer in South Truro, Massachusetts, on Cape Cod, where Hopper began focusing on the Cape's unique sunlight and, in 1930 alone, painted such works as South Truro Church, Corn Hill, Hills, and South Truro. At first they stayed in a rented cottage, but in 1934 Hopper designed and built, with financial support from Jo, a new home in South Truro. The wooden house has a large and distinctive window facing north, onto a scrubby bluff in the dunes above Fisher Beach. Over their lifetimes, Hopper and Jo spent 40 summers in this house, now called the "Hopper House", often painting for months at a time.

Not long after returning to New York from their trip to Mexico, in late July 1951 the Hoppers departed again, this time for South Truro. Soon Jo had painted Jewels for the Madonna (Homage to Illa); Hopper began Rooms by the Sea in late September and finished it by October. He communicated this to his New York art dealer, Frank Rehn, adding that he hoped to complete a second painting as well. Jo attached a note to the letter, telling Rehn the painting was "A queer one – could be called 'the Jumping Off Place' – we can't count on that one ever being sold – even by a wizard like you".

== Description ==
Rooms by the Sea depicts a creative and imaginative view outside the door to Hopper's Truro studio overlooking Cape Cod Bay. The middle distance of the painting consists only of a white wall with a room mostly hidden behind it, showing glimpses of some furniture and a picture hanging on the wall. The open door shows the large, blue bay of the Atlantic Ocean, as bright sunlight enters and falls across the bottom of the wall and floor, with shadows along the top and foreground.

=== Style and composition ===
Having spent time at the Hopper House with Edward and Jo, art historian Katharine Kuh believed that Rooms by the Sea captures the overall essence of the unique Cape Cod location and space of the house – most notably the locale's brilliant light, which not only pours through the house from outside but also reflects off of the ocean. Like Kuh, Karen Davies notes that the composition derives from the light-filled ocean view of the house, and is less than representative of the actual house and "more a product of artistic imagination". Ivo Kranzfelder argues that Hopper breaks several rules of perspective, with the source of light in the painting difficult to trace and the space of the ocean contrasting with the space of the room – all of which gives the composition a sense of uneasiness.

Photographer and educator Richard Benson observes the glaring discrepancy of size, such as the missing (or large and unseen) stairs to the door and the unusual appearance of the ocean waves in relation to the room. "Hopper has made this view of a pair of rooms as though it's through the wide-angle lens of a camera", writes Benson, "But when he comes to the sea, it's as though he used a narrow angle that makes everything big." This was the second time in just a few years that Hopper had experimented with the perspective of stairs and the view outside a doorway, with Stairway (1949) an example of a slightly earlier attempt.

Realist painter Philip Koch, who since the 1980s has lived many summers at the Hopper House, calls the room depicted in the painting an "invented space", describing how Hopper willingly violated the rules of perspective. The depiction of the rooms, he wrote, is faithful to reality, but the light shown falling on the walls is a fantasy: these walls face north and would never receive that kind of sunlight. Art critic Richard Elovich speaks of the "mysterious" elements within the painting, comparing it to earlier works like House at Dusk (1935). Elovich points to the heightened literalism of Hopper's title (Rooms by the Sea), as the ocean threatens to enter the door of the house.

=== Abstract and surrealist elements ===
Katharine Kuh describes the painting as "virtually abstract", in spite of Hopper's strong resistance to the term as a modern American realist. Lloyd Goodrich once informed Hopper that he had given a lecture showing the compositional geometry of High Noon (1949) alongside the work of abstract artist Piet Mondrian, to which Hopper responded tersely: "You kill me." Art historian Charles W. Millard also maintained that Hopper was an abstract painter, citing Rooms by the Sea and Sun in an Empty Room as two examples. Millard notes that Hopper had a penchant for "rigorous geometric abstraction" by way of his use of color, but that he was unable to transition to pure abstraction due to his artistic background. Rooms by the Sea has been described as a "formal geometric study of light and shadow", and can be viewed in the abstract tradition of artists like Andrew Wyeth and surrealists like René Magritte. Joseph Stanton describes the painting as highly reminiscent of Magritte, also noting that Magritte's The Empire of Light II (1950) displays Hopper-like aspects. Art critic Ken Johnson acknowledges that Rooms by the Sea is "borderline surrealistic", calling it one of Hopper's "strangest" works.

== Provenance ==
Art collector Stephen Carlton Clark, heir to the Singer sewing machine company through his grandfather Edward Cabot Clark, purchased the painting in November 1951 from Rehn Gallery in New York, just shortly after Hopper had finished it and before it had ever been seen or exhibited. By this time, Clark already owned six other paintings by Hopper. Unlike most of Hopper's works, which Clark donated to or exhibited at museums, he kept Rooms by the Sea for himself. Upon his death in 1960, his collection was split into two bequests, one to the Metropolitan Museum of Art in New York and another to the Yale University Art Gallery (YUAG) in New Haven. Rooms by the Sea was part of a total of 23 works donated to the YUAG in 1960 (in addition to ten works already donated to YUAG by Clark before his death), as well as $1 million set aside for the gallery by Clark in his bequest. Yale University Art Gallery received Clark's bequest in October 1960 and placed Rooms by the Sea on exhibition in 1961 for six weeks from October 12 to November 26. In 2009, YUAG also acquired a charcoal sketch by Hopper, that he had used as a preparatory drawing for Rooms by the Sea.

== See also ==
- List of works by Edward Hopper
- Liminal space (aesthetic)
