= Dayton Art Institute =

- U.S. National Register of Historic Places
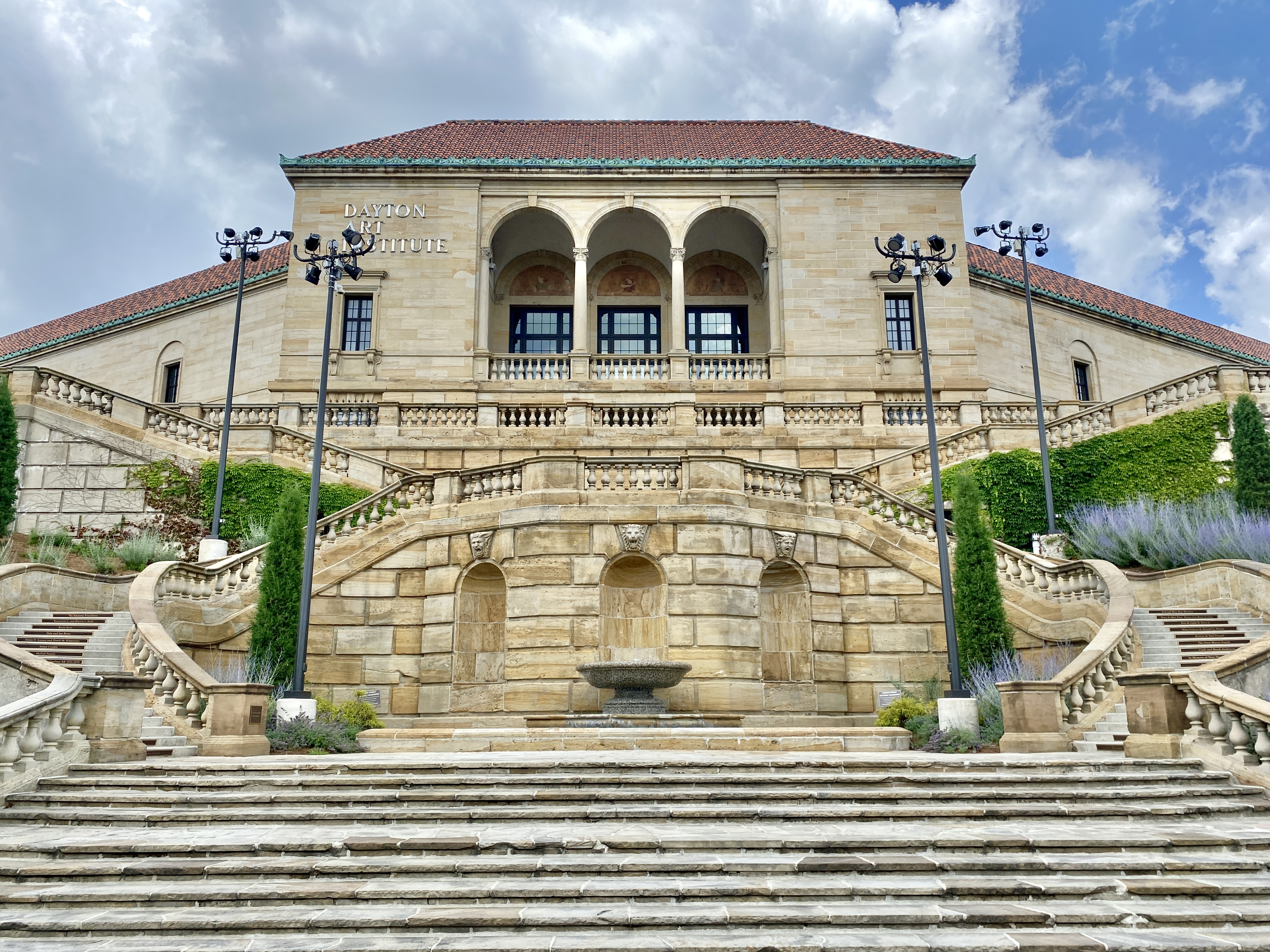

- Location within Ohio Location within the United States
- Location: Forest and Riverview Aves., Dayton, Ohio
- Coordinates: 39°45′57″N 84°12′4″W
- Area: 6 acres (2.4 ha)
- Built: 1930
- Architect: Edward B. Green
- Architectural style: Renaissance, Italian Renaissance Revival
- NRHP reference No.: 74001579
- Added to NRHP: November 19, 1974

The Dayton Art Institute (DAI) is a museum of fine arts in Dayton, Ohio, United States. The Dayton Art Institute has been rated by Parents magazine one of the top 10 best art museums in the United States for children. The museum also ranks in the top 3% of all art museums in North America in 3 of 4 factors. In 2007, the art institute saw 303,834 visitors.

== History ==
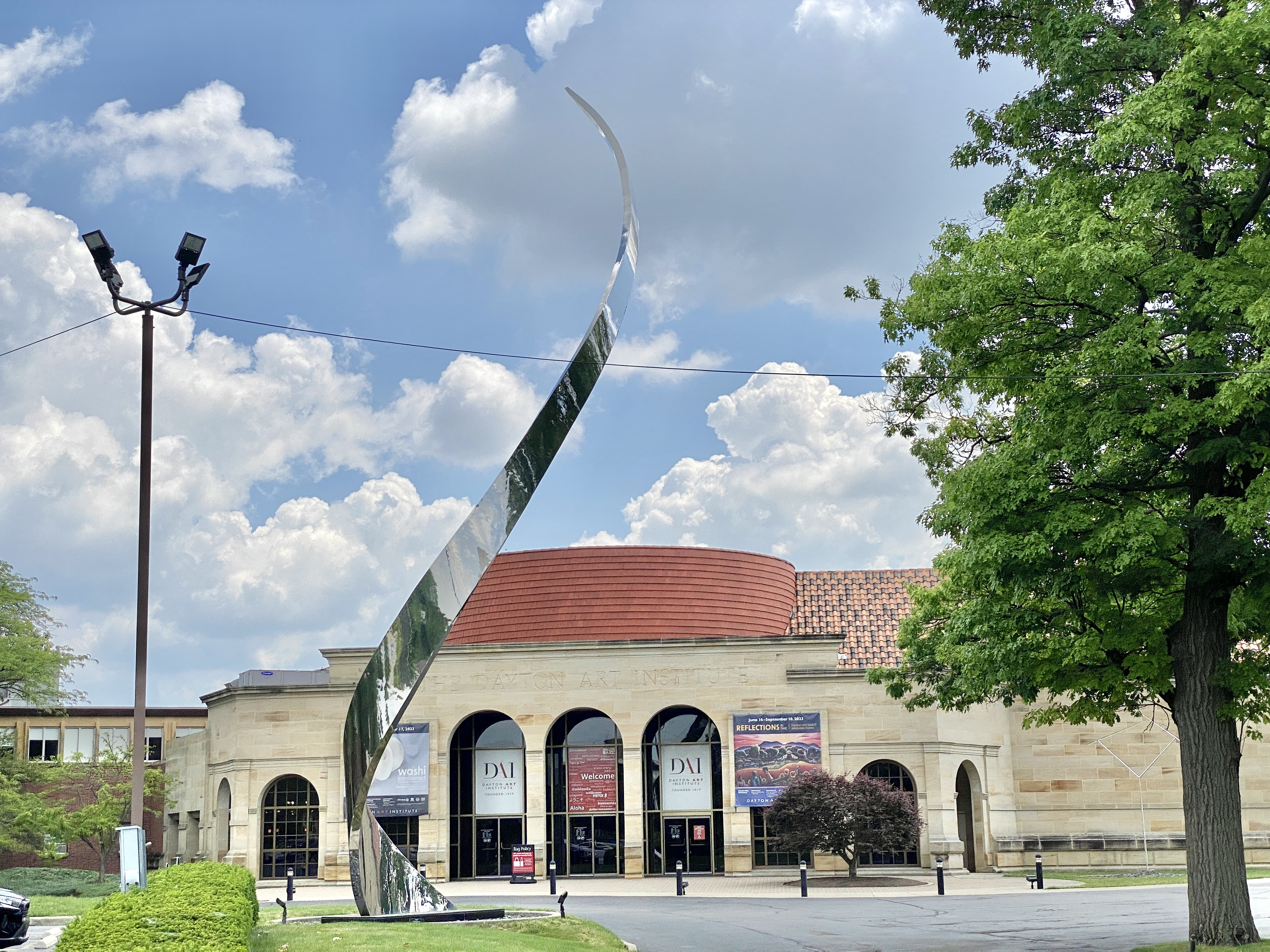
DAI main entrance from Stoddard Avenue.

Founded in a downtown mansion in 1919 as the Dayton Museum of Fine Arts, the museum moved to a newly designed Edward B. Green building in 1930. The DAI was modeled after the Casino in the gardens of the Villa Farnese at Caprarola, and the front hillside stairway was inspired by the Italian Renaissance garden stairs at the Villa d'Este, near Rome, and Italy. The building was originally constructed with imported roof tiles from Italy, but after they began to crumble from the harsher Ohio winters they were replaced by Ludowici tiles in 1979. It is also visible from and easily accessible from I-75, which passes through the center of Dayton.

The museum was later renamed the Dayton Art Institute as an indication of the growing importance of its school in addition to the museum. The nearly 60,000-square-foot (5,600 m^{2}) building is now listed on the National Register of Historic Places.

== Museum information ==
The museum's collection contains more than 20,000 objects spanning 5,000 years. In September, 2005, the Museum became one of eleven galleries in the US to host The Quest for Immortality: Treasures of Ancient Egypt, the largest collection of ancient artifacts ever to travel outside Egypt.

The art museum is an Italian Renaissance–style building, which sits atop a hill overlooking downtown Dayton. The institute's highlights are the museum's Asian, 17th-century Baroque, 18th- and 19th-century American, and contemporary art collections. In addition to its collections, the museum frequently features other exhibitions.

== Notable works ==
Some of the most notable works held by the institute are:

- The Song of the Nightingale by William-Adolphe Bouguereau
- Purple Leaves by Georgia O'Keeffe
- Cantata by Norman Lewis
- Untitled by Joan Mitchell
- Sea Change by Helen Frankenthaler
- Untitled by Louise Nevelson
- Louise Nevelson by Alison Van Pelt
- Lost and Found by Alison Saar
- Embroidery from Uzbekistan by Janet Fish
- Sawdy by Edward Kienholz
- Study Heads of an Old Man by Peter Paul Rubens
- High Noon by Edward Hopper
- Aurora Red Ikebana with Bright Yellow Stems by Dale Chihuly
- After the Bath by Edgar Degas
- Stacks in Celebration by Charles Sheeler
- Scene in Yosemite Valley by Albert Bierstadt
- Allegory of the Four Seasons by Bartolomeo Manfredi
- Water Lilies by Claude Monet
- American Indian Series (Russell Means) by Andy Warhol
- Homage to Painting by Roy Lichtenstein
- Shimmering Madness by Sandy Skoglund

== Gallery ==
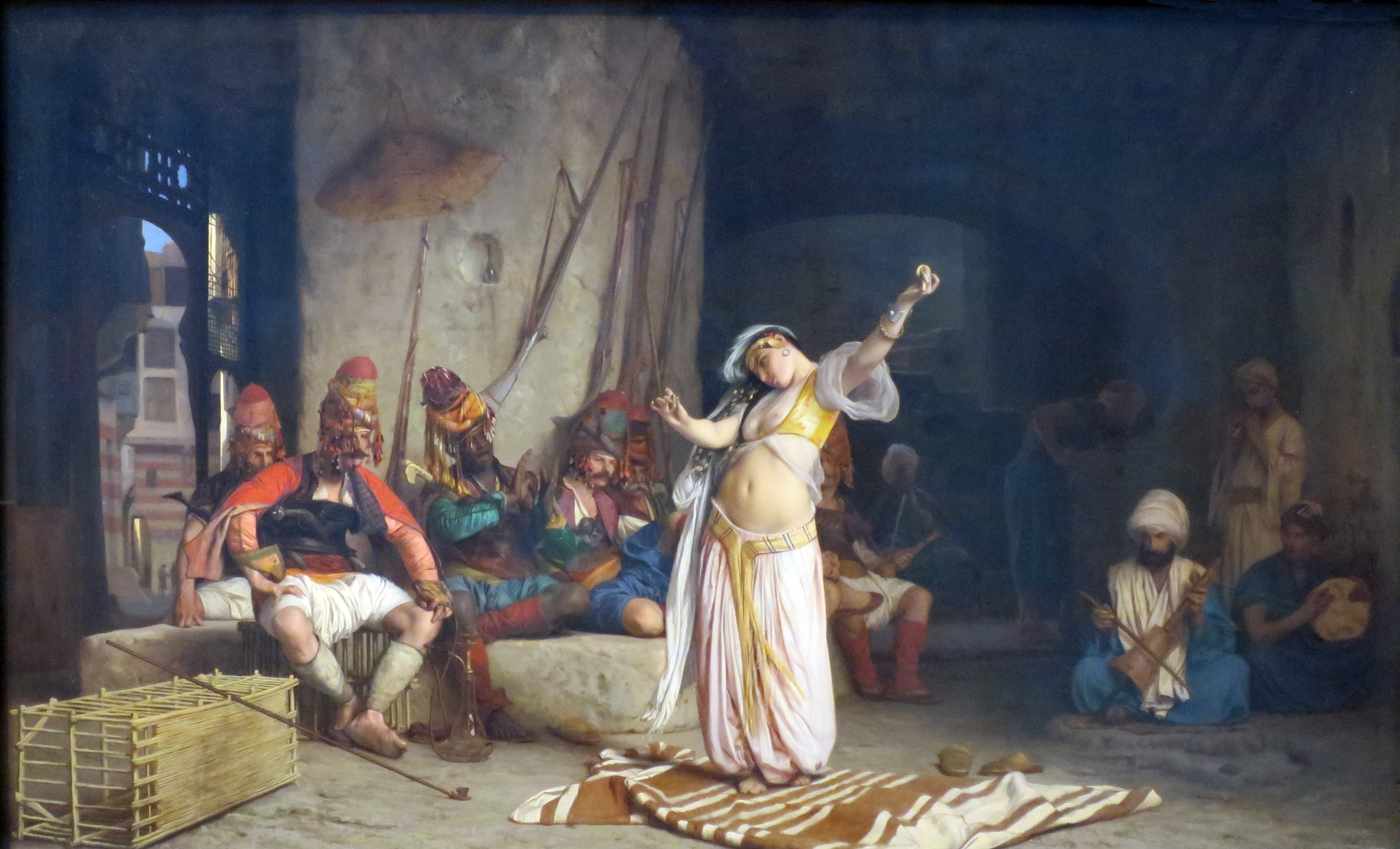
Dance of the Almeh by Jean-Léon Gérôme, 1863

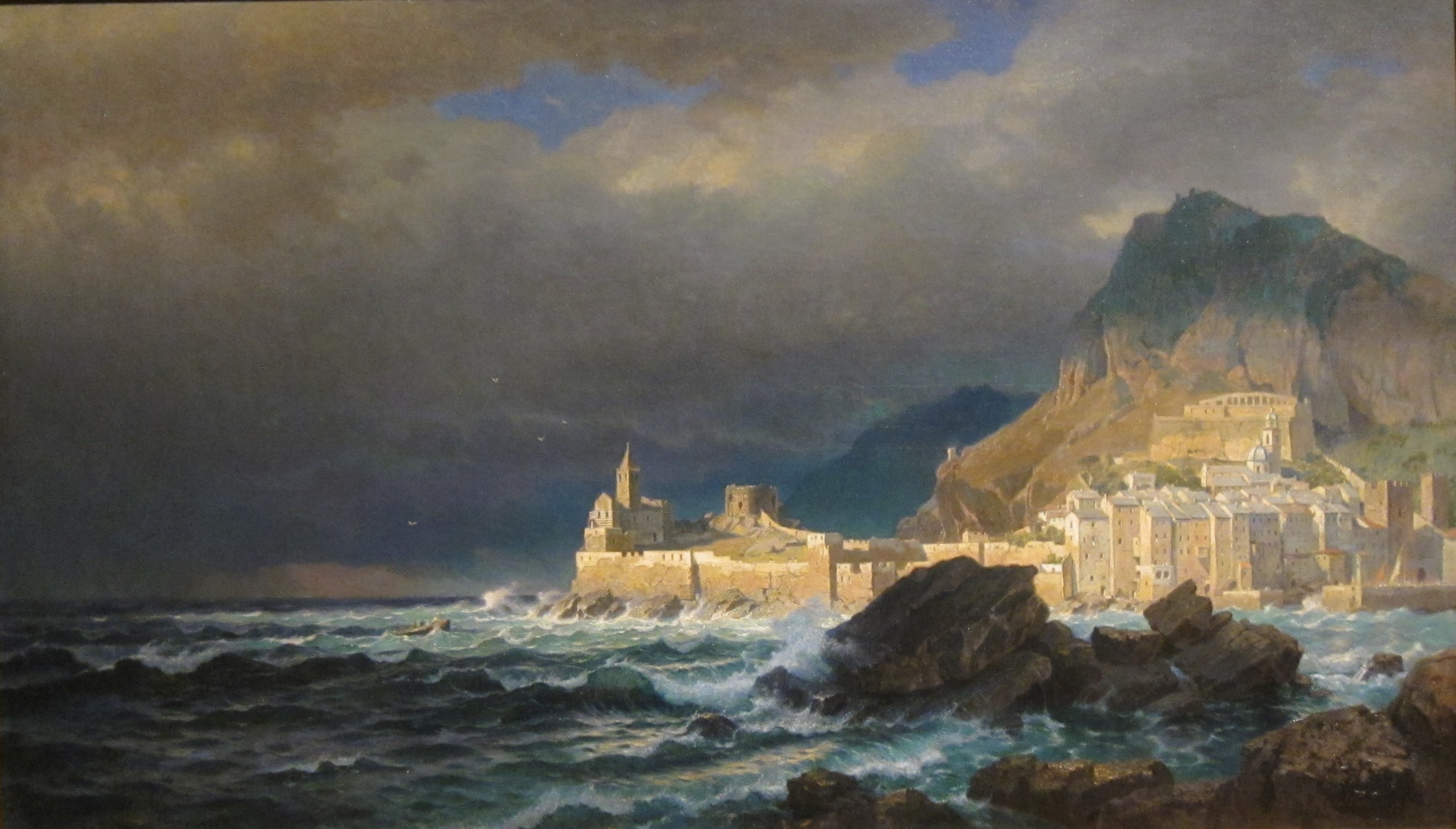
Porto Venere by William Stanley Haseltine, 1878

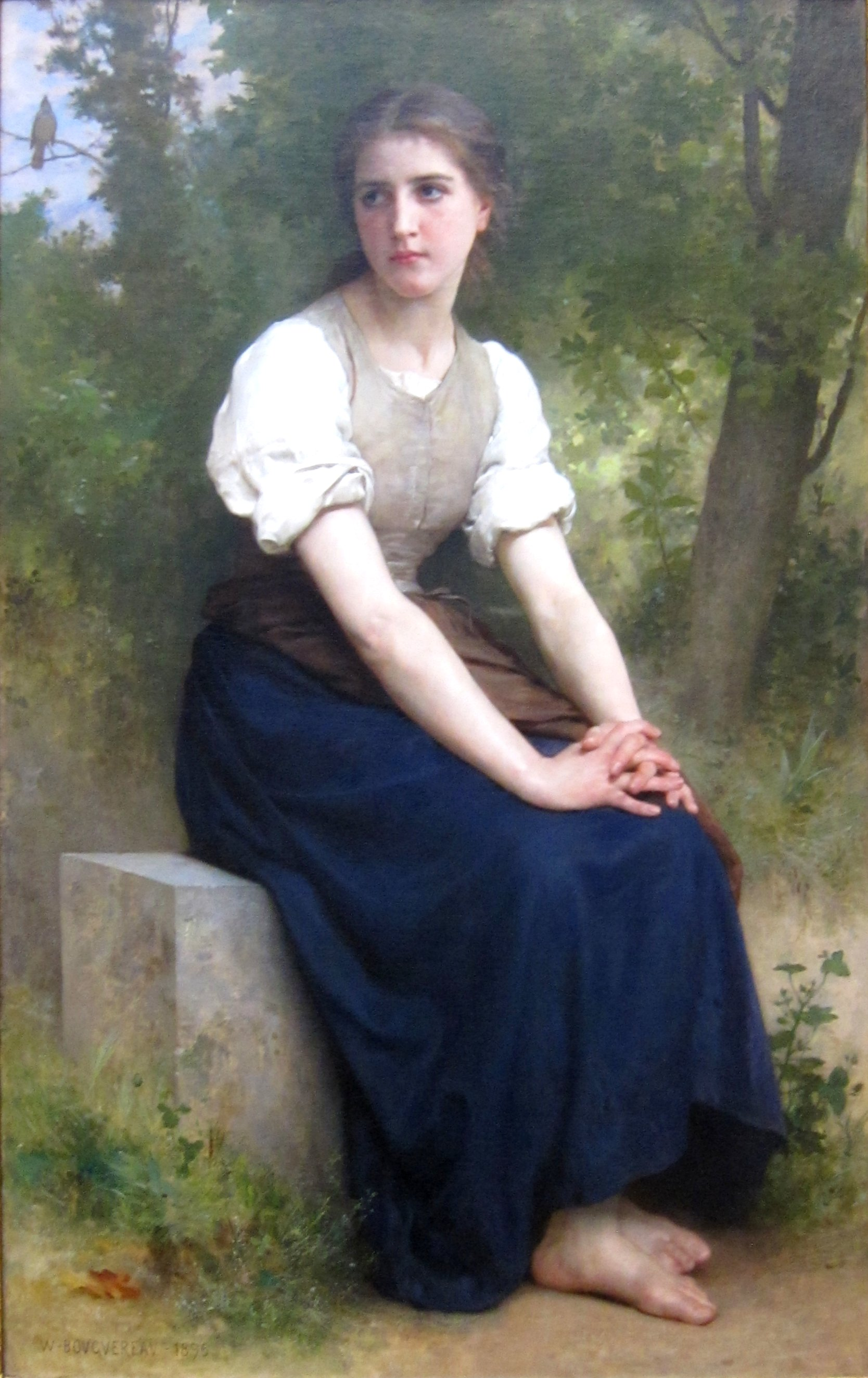
The Song of the Nightingale by William-Adolphe Bouguereau, 1895

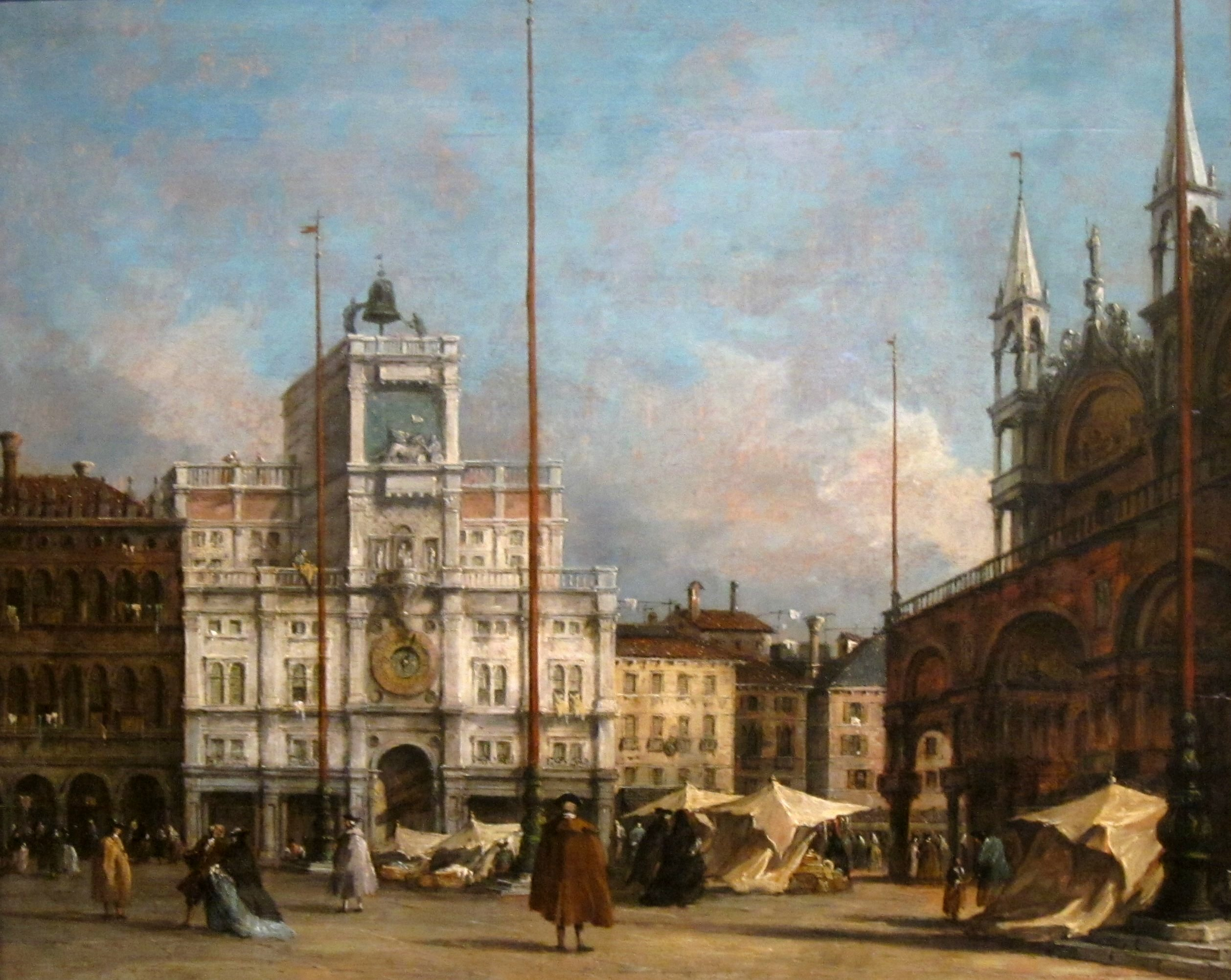
The Clock Tower, Venice by Francesco Guardi, 1760

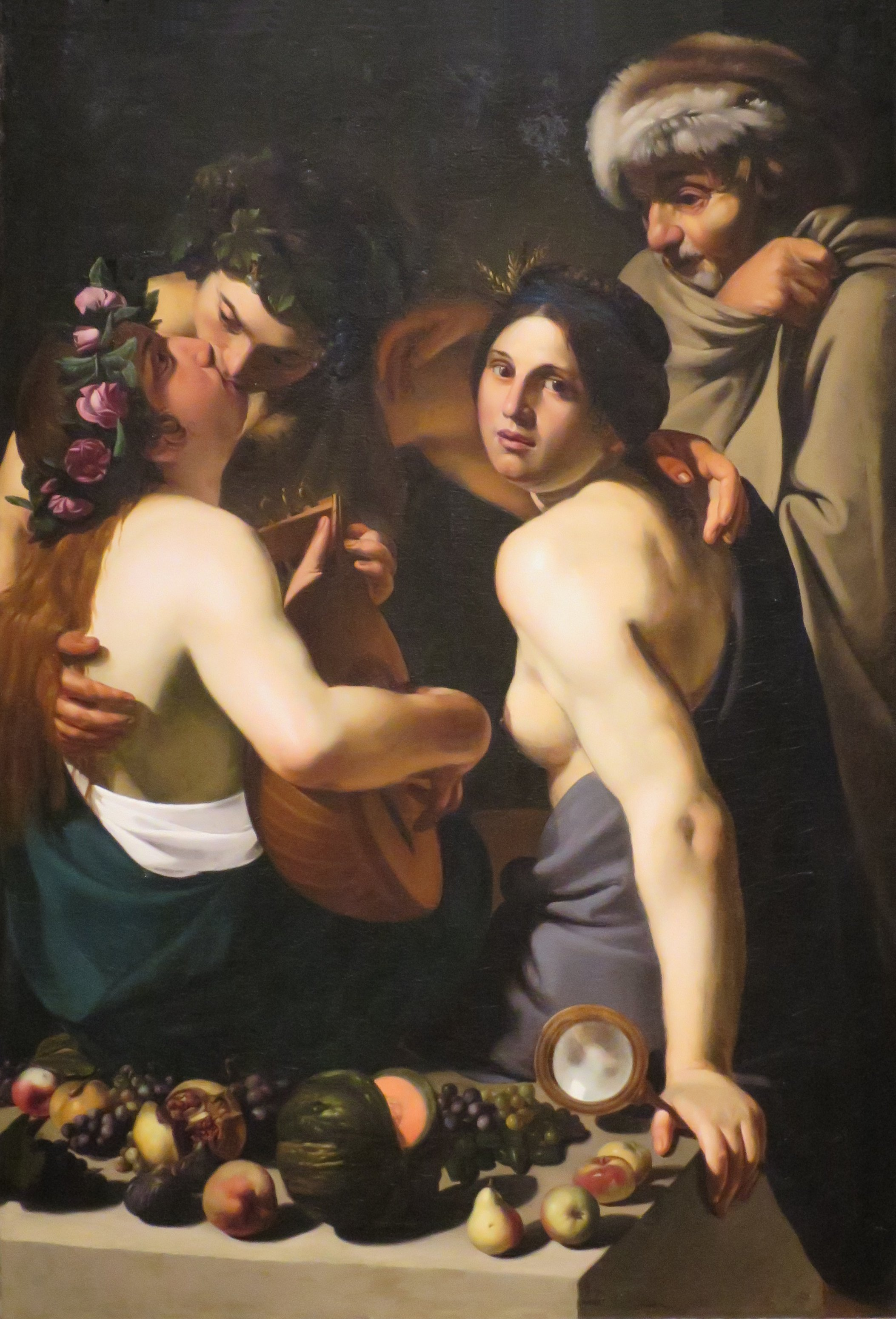
Allegory of the Four Seasons by Bartolomeo Manfredi, 1610

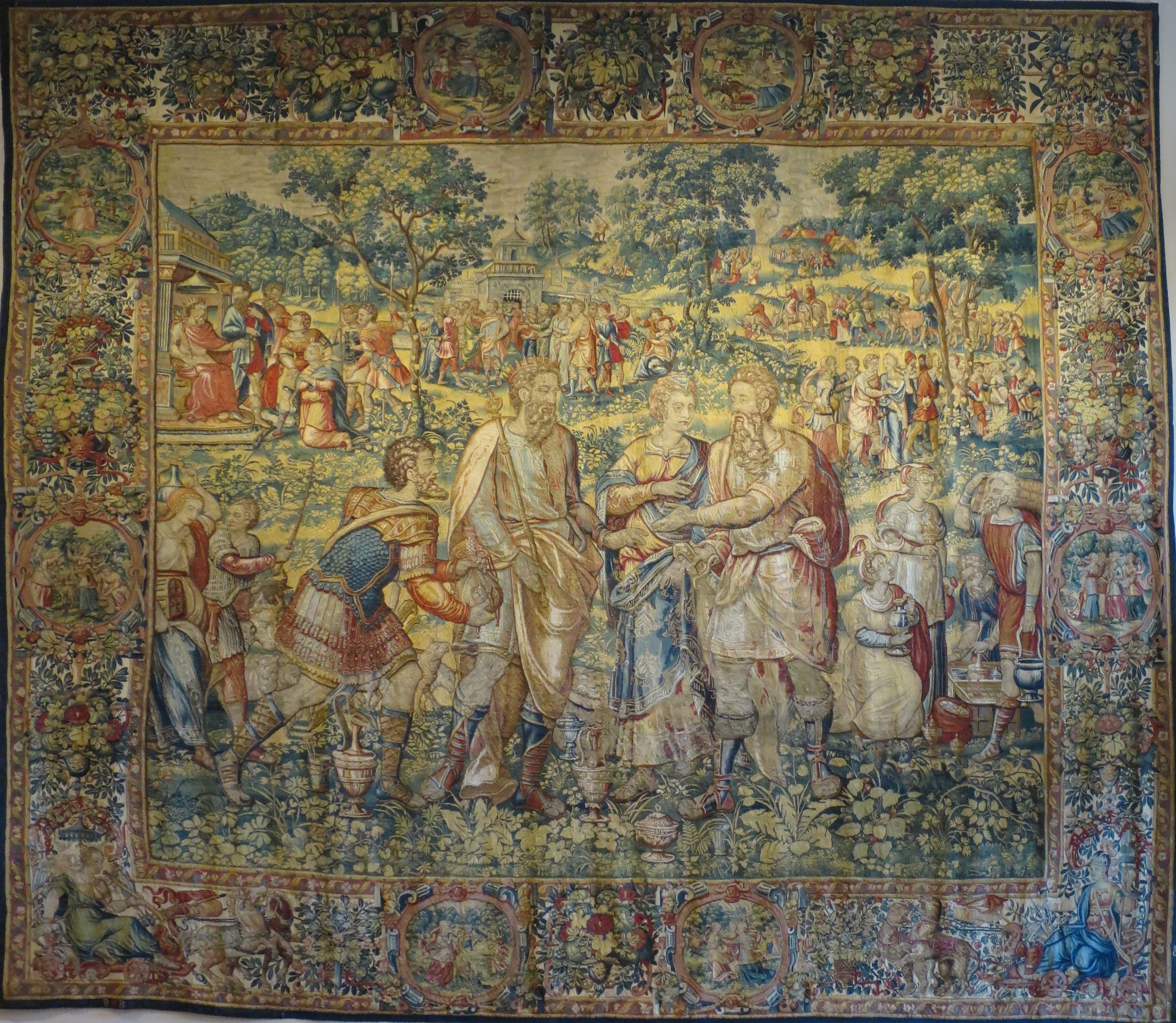
King Abimelech Restores Sarah to her Husband, Abraham, Flemish tapestry by Frans Geubels, 1580

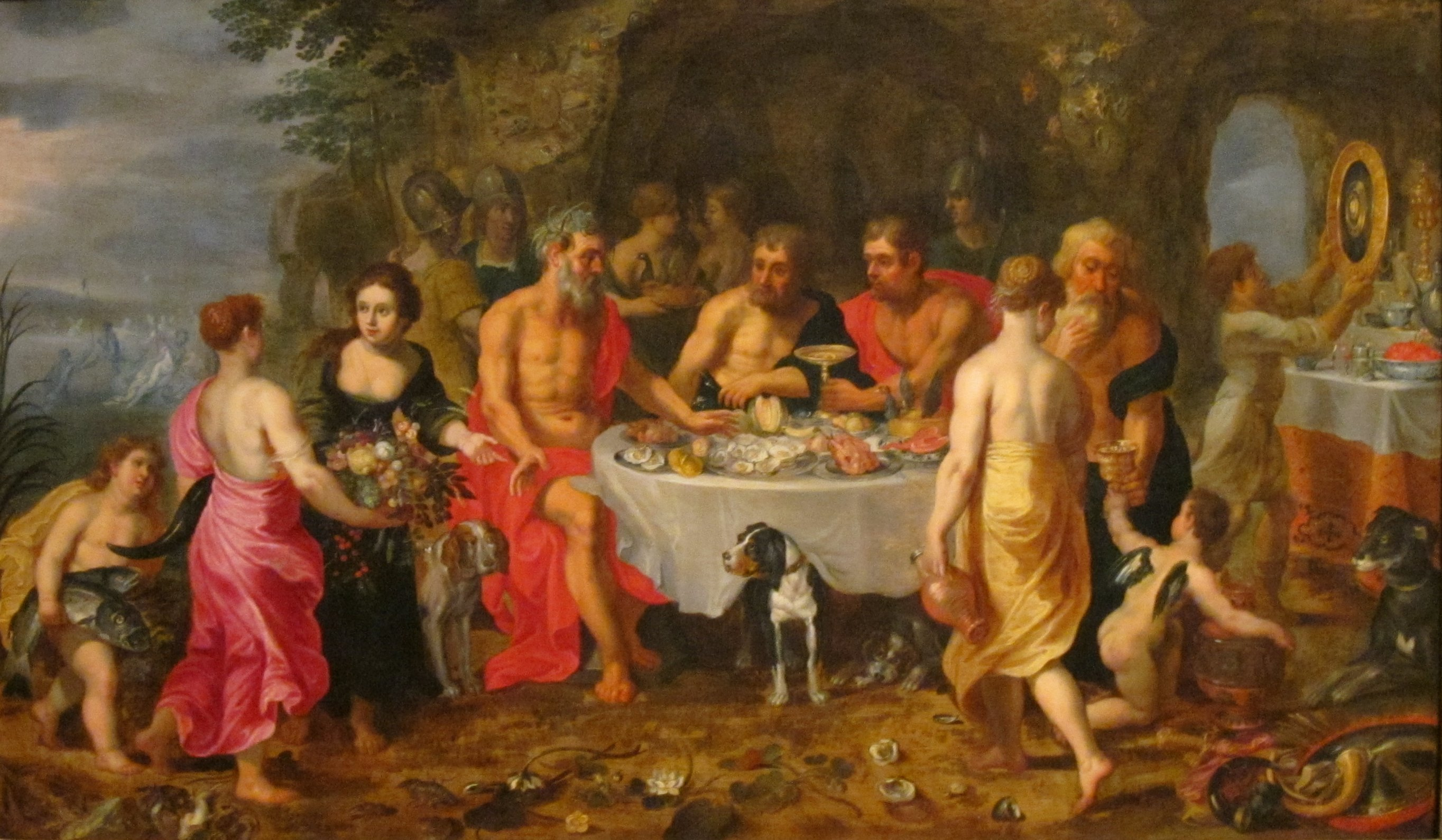
The Feast of Achelous by Jan Brueghel the Younger and Hendrick van Balen, 1610-1620

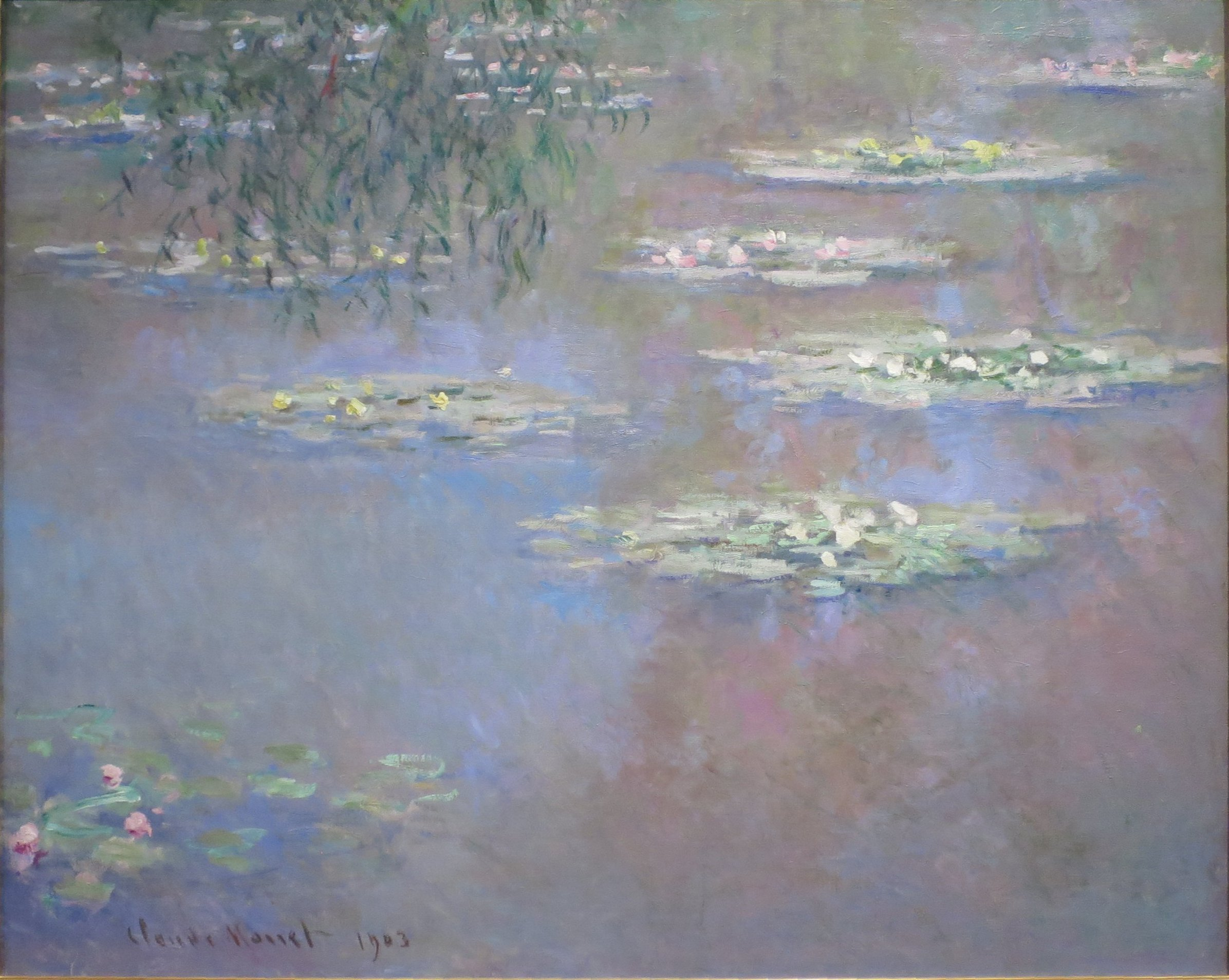
Water Lilies by Claude Monet, 1903

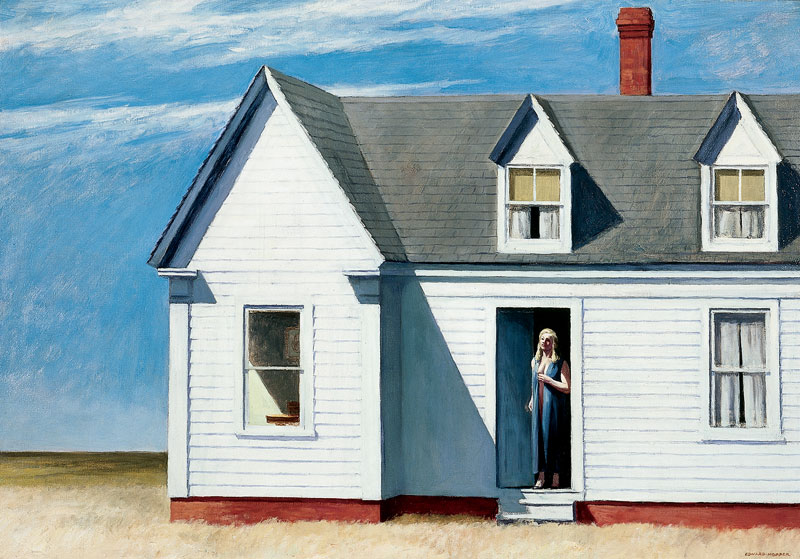
High Noon by Edward Hopper, 1949

== See also ==
- National Register of Historic Places listings in Dayton, Ohio
