= Almah (dancer) =

Type of female entertainers in the Middle East

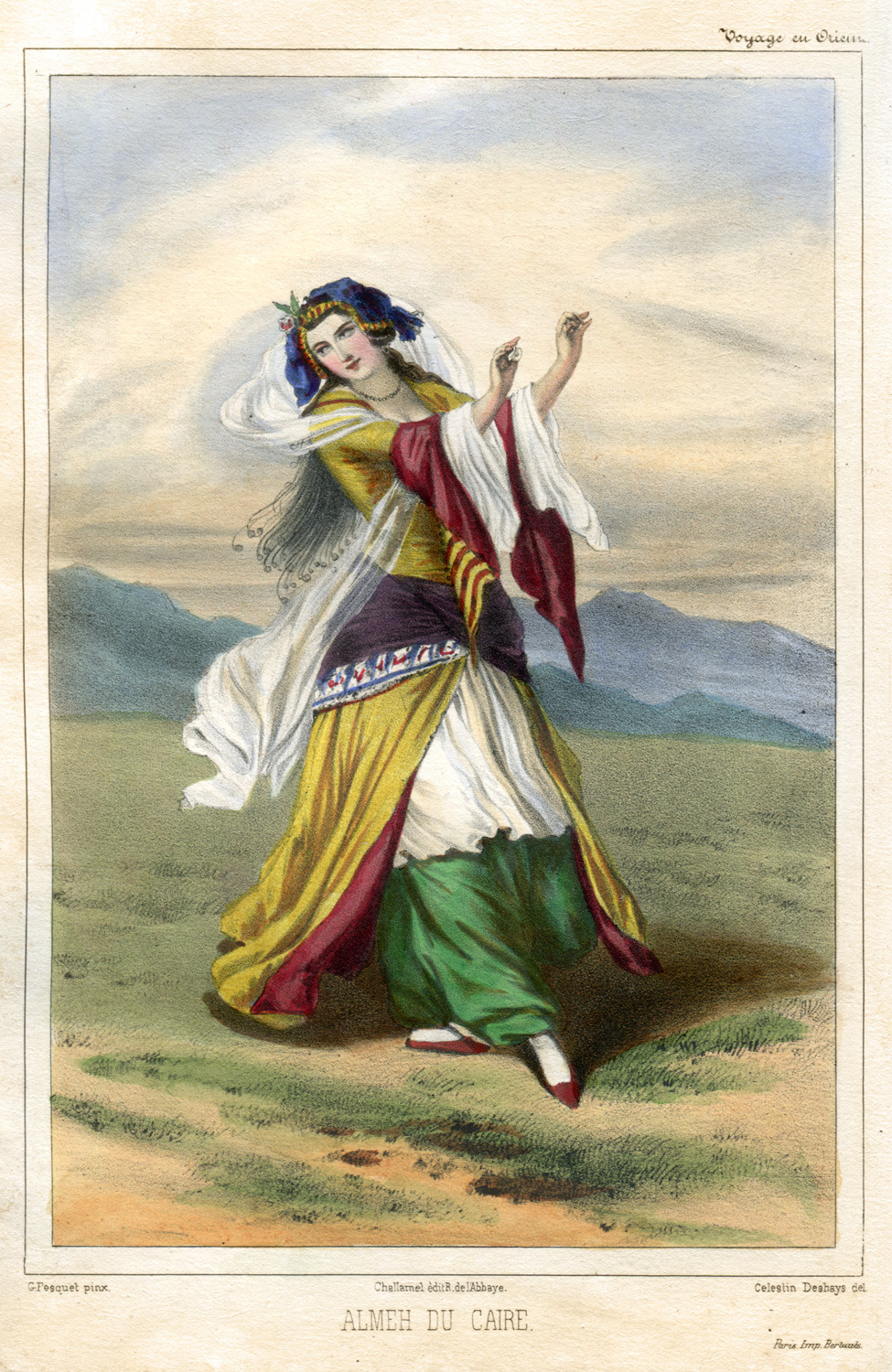
Painting of an almah by Frédéric Auguste Antoine, 1843

Almah or Almeh (Arabic: عالمة IPA: [ˈʕælmæ ] IPA: [ˈʕālma], plural ʕawæ̃lim عوالم [ʕāˈwāːlem, -lɪm], from علم ʻālima "to know, be learned") was the name of a class of courtesans or female entertainers in Egypt, women educated to sing and recite classical Arabic poetry and to discourse wittily. They were educated girls of good social standing, trained in dancing, singing and poetry, present at festivals and entertainments, and hired as mourners at funerals.

The awalim were first introduced as singers, not dancers or prostitutes, according to Edward William Lane's book, Manner and Costumes of modern Egyptians. Lane additionally wrote that the almah didn't display herself at all, but sang from behind a screen or from another room at weddings and other respectable festivities. Consequently, the awalem were not subject to exile in Upper Egypt.

In the 19th century, almah came to be used as a synonym for all the erotic local dancers who usually came from very poor backgrounds and sometimes contributed in sexual acts in return of money. As a consequence, the traditional erotic dancers of Egypt had all their performances banned in 1834, because they were considered "unclassy". As a result of the ban, all dancers in later Egypt became awalim, which was officially classified as a legal occupation.

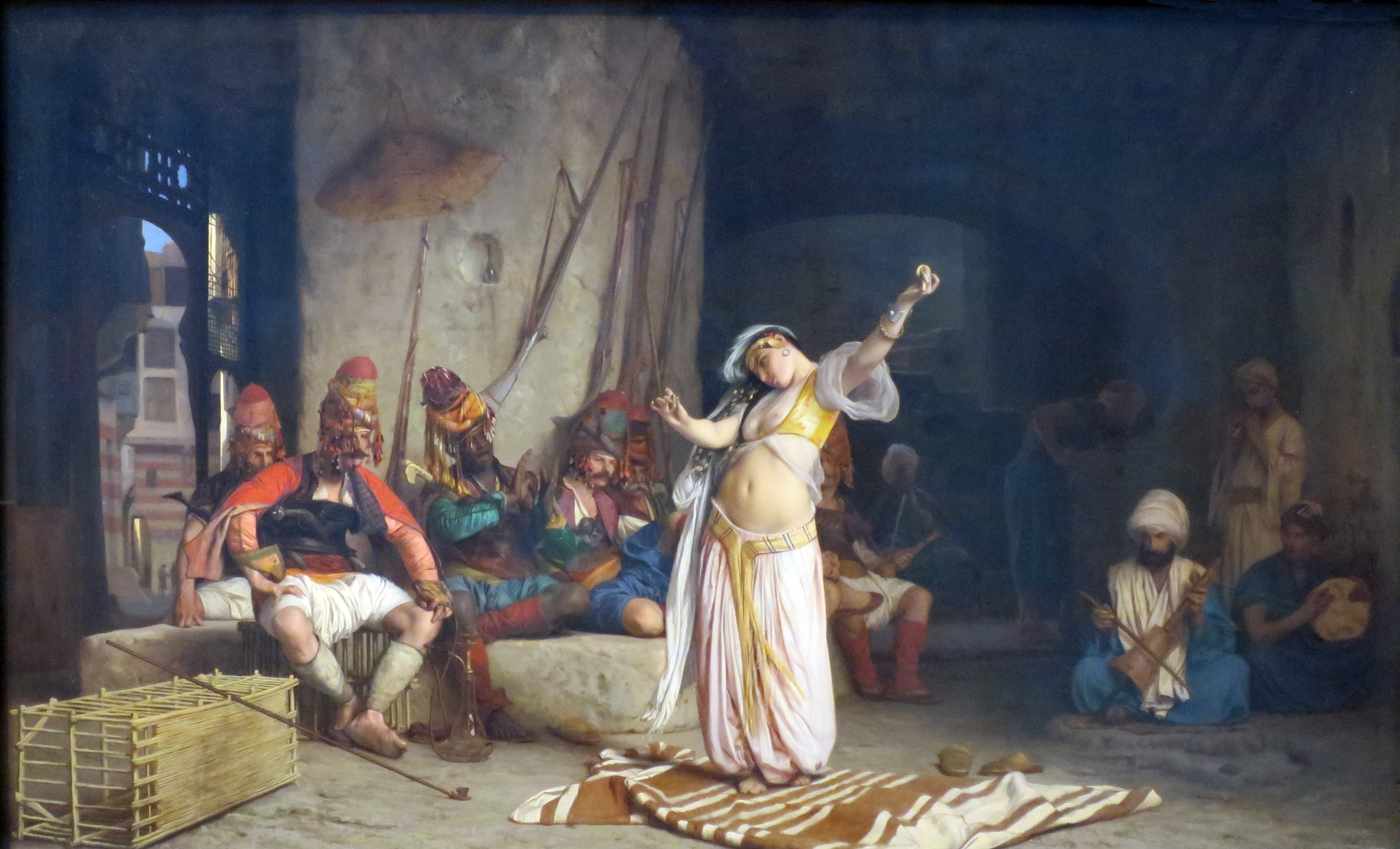
Dance of the Almah by Jean-Léon Gérôme, 1863

Transliterated into French as almée, the term came to be synonymous with belly dancer in European Orientalism of the 19th century.

== Notable awalim ==
From the last decades of the 19th century until the 1920s, some of the most notable and last awalim of Egypt include:

- Shooq
- Bamba Kashar
- Chafika al-Qebtiya
- Mounira al-Mahdiya
- Badia Masabni
- Beba Ibrahim
- Nabawiya al-Masryia
