= AIDS–Holocaust metaphor =

Comparison used by AIDS activists

The AIDS–Holocaust metaphor is used by AIDS activists to compare the AIDS epidemic to the Holocaust. The comparison was popularized by Larry Kramer and ACT-UP, especially the organization's French chapter, as a way to garner sympathy for AIDS sufferers and spur research into the disease. Although the comparison is now "commonly heard" with regard to AIDS, critics maintain that it is a form of Holocaust trivialization.

== Background ==
Between 1941 and 1945, about six million European Jews were systematically murdered by Nazi Germany and its allies as part of a deliberately planned genocide known as the Holocaust. Gay men were also persecuted under Nazi rule, with between 5,000 and 15,000 sent to the concentration camps and forced to wear pink triangle badges.

The AIDS epidemic began in 1981 when young, healthy men from the LGBTQ+ community in the United States were diagnosed with Pneumocystis carinii pneumonia. This turned out to be due to immune deficiency caused by the HIV virus. More than 35 million people worldwide have died as a result of HIV infection.

== Usage ==
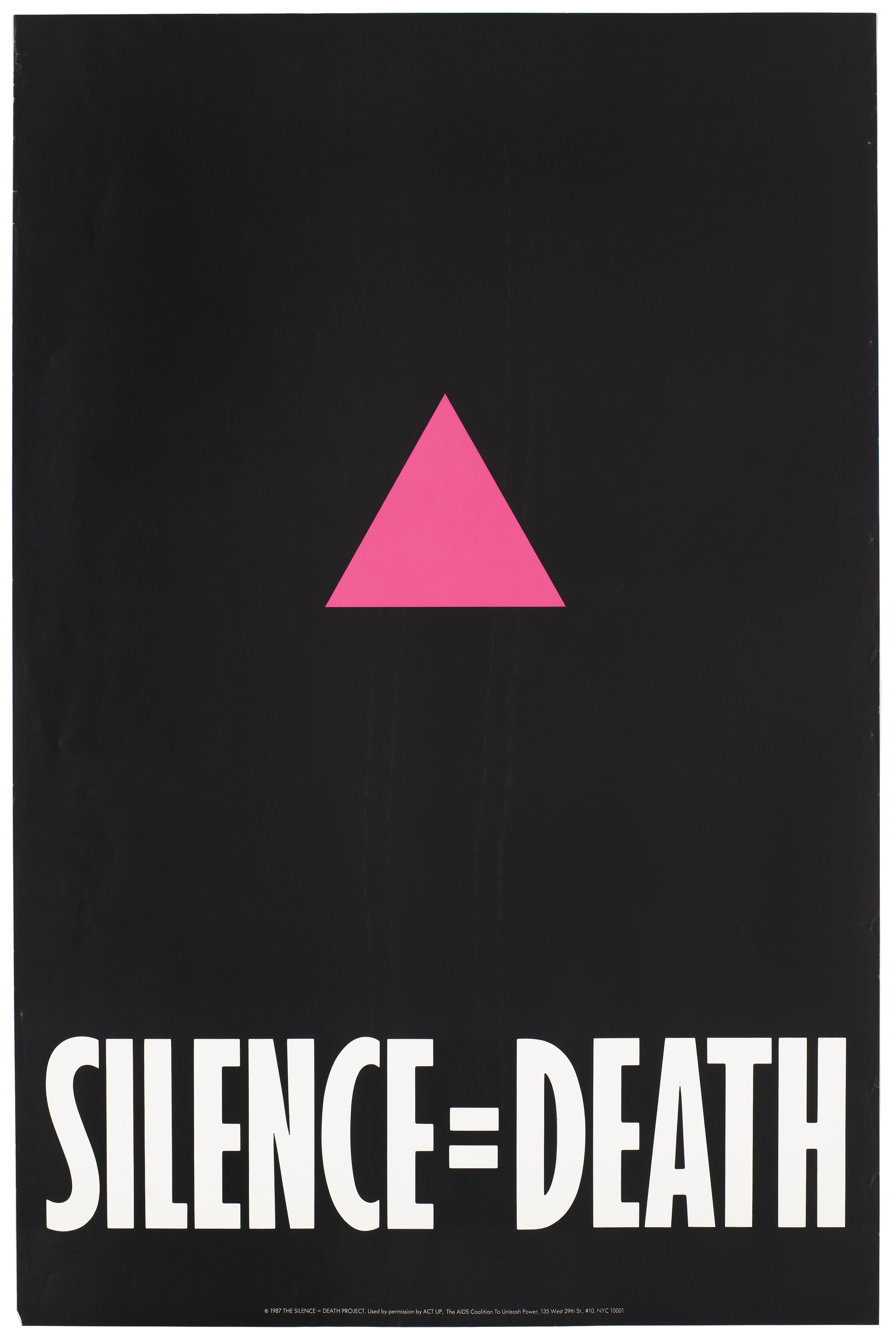
Poster of the Silence=Death Project, also used by ACT-UP

In 1985, a group of gay men in New York (including Avram Finkelstein) founded the Silence=Death Project to raise awareness about AIDS. According to Finkelstein, the group was about half Jewish. Finkelstein and others designed the well-known pink triangle poster after being horrified by William F. Buckley Jr.'s call for HIV positive individuals to be tattooed. (Following criticism, Buckley admitted that his proposal "reminded everyone of Auschwitz".)

Larry Kramer was an American playwright and AIDS activist who frequently invoked the AIDS-as-Holocaust metaphor. Kramer considered the lack of press coverage in American newspapers of the AIDS epidemic to be similar to its tepid response to the Holocaust. He also criticized some LGBT organizations, such as Gay Men's Health Crisis, for not being militant enough in the struggle against the AIDS epidemic; in Kramer's opinion, this was comparable to the reaction of the Judenräte, 'Jewish councils' set up by the Nazis, to the murder of their communities. Kramer believed that the slow pace of AIDS research was due to prejudice against the LGBTQ+ community and constituted genocide by neglect. Officials in the administration of Ronald Reagan were "equal to Hitler and his Nazi doctors performing their murderous experiments in the camps—not because of similar intentions, but because of similar results", and Anthony Fauci, leader of the National Institute of Allergy and Infectious Diseases, was comparable to Nazi war criminal Adolf Eichmann. Kramer founded a new organization, ACT-UP, to agitate for AIDS sufferers. ACT-UP was known for its combative rhetoric and use of the slogan "Silence=Death" and the pink triangle.

The AIDS-as-Holocaust metaphor was especially common in French AIDS activist groups. ACT UP-Paris was active in drawing parallels between a well known example of official indifference to mass death in a specific community (the Holocaust) and applied that to the perceived indifference of the government to the AIDS crisis, which affected marginalized groups. French photographer Hervé Guibert, who died of AIDS, was known for having compared his body to that of prisoners at Auschwitz concentration camp. Alain Emmanuel Dreuilhe proposed that AIDS was a turning point in LGBT history, similar to what the Holocaust had been for the Jews. In 1997, Steven Epstein argued that the comparison of AIDS and genocide was growing less commonplace as activist groups accommodated themselves with the medical establishment.

== Reception ==
According to David Caron, the comparison of AIDS and the Holocaust has inspired more anger than other comparisons relating to genocides. Arlene Stein writes that the AIDS–Holocaust metaphor is part of a discourse in which the "Holocaust has become a universal symbol of injustice". Susan Sontag was critical of the metaphor, telling a reporter that "The Holocaust was inflicted by human beings on human beings. It's wrong to compare a situation in which there was real culpability to one in which there is none... The word [Holocaust] should not be used metaphorically".

According to Vanity Fair in 2013, it is a "commonly heard metaphor about AIDS". However, research by Andrea Kalmin and Katherine Bischoping in 1999 indicated that most Americans did not make comparisons between the Holocaust and the victimization of sexual minorities. Caron maintains that the AIDS–Holocaust metaphor is a form of Holocaust trivialization.

== See also ==
- Reports from the Holocaust: The Making of an AIDS Activist
