= Marlene McCarty =

Visual artist and activist

Marlene McCarty is a multidisciplinary artist and activist based in New York. She was a member of the AIDS collective Gran Fury and co-founded the trans-disciplinary design studio Bureau. Using everyday materials including graphite, ballpoint pen, and highlighter, McCarty creates mural-sized drawings related to issues ranging from sexual and social formation, gender and power, to parricide and infanticide.

== Early life and education ==
McCarty was born in 1957 and raised in Lexington, Kentucky. After graduating from Sayre School, McCarty attended the University of Cincinnati College of Design Architecture, Art, and Planning (1975- 1977) before studying in Basel, Switzerland, at Schule fur Gestaltung Basel (1978 - 1983), where she `majored in design. During the early 1980s in Basel, McCarty did scenic installations for Punk and New Wave bands at Kulturhaus Palazzo in Leistal.

== Career ==
=== Gran Fury ===
After graduating from Basel in 1983, McCarty moved to New York City's East Village to become an artist. In 1987, while working at M&Co as a designer, McCarty became a member of the AIDS activist art collective Gran Fury. Gran Fury fought to affect AIDS policies, staging public AIDS activist interventions. Their goal was to spread information about AIDS at a time when the government was not speaking on this issue. Their major projects include The Government Has Blood on Its Hands, an action at FDA headquarters in Washington, D.C., that protested Federal policies concerning AIDS drugs, drug trials, and access to drugs. Kissing Doesn't Kill was an appropriation of a Benetton ad showing a diverse group of same sex, interracial, and heterosexual couples kissing, placed on city buses across America countering the public fear that kissing transmitted AIDS.

In January 2012, the first historical survey of Gran Fury’s world-renowned work opened at the NYU Steinhardt 80WSE gallery. The collective’s work is archived at the Whitney Museum of American Art and New York Public Library.

=== Bureau, 1989-2001 ===
In 1989, McCarty co-founded Bureau with artist Donald Moffett. Bureau was a “trans-disciplinary design studio” whose mandate was to produce art, film titles, political work, and commercial work. Bureau worked with clients such as Calvin Klein, Sundance, Channel, HBO, and Amazon. In 2014, Bureau received the Visual AIDS Vanguard Award.

=== Metro Pictures Gallery, 1990s ===
McCarty landed her first exhibit, Shut Up You Shut Up, at Wessel O-Conner Gallery in 1990. Her early works were large text paintings featuring words such as "Slash" and "Snatch" in a highly stylized typeface, or single phrases such as "I may not go down in history but I may go down on your little sister," and "You're my slut bottom suck." McCarty used found language, appropriating the sexist speech she heard from street harassers and catcallers or that she saw in graffiti. The text was hand drawn and ironed onto T-shirt material that was used as the canvas.

In 1991 McCarty joined Metro Pictures Gallery. Her works were exhibited across the US and Europe accompanied by a catalogue, Die Neoantigen (The Nineties) in 1994 at the Vienna Secession in Austria

=== Poltergeist, Girls at Home/ The “murder girls” series, 1995–2014 ===
McCarty started research for what was to become her most famous body of work, the “murder girls” series or “Poltergeist, Girls at Home,” a series of 42 mural-sized portraits made with graphite pencil and ball-point pen. Each portrait was based on a true crime case of teenage girls who murdered their mothers, parental figures, or, in some instances, girls who had been murdered by their mothers. McCarty found the final effect of iron-on portraits using the girls' photographs to look like “Warhol wannabes” that were more about production and manufacturing than about the girls themselves.

In McCarty's portraits, the girls wear see-through clothes revealing nipples, breasts, and vulvas. The artist wanted to draw attention to the changing social expectations of the girls as they transitioned from girlhood to womanhood. She took great care to distinguish the work from sensationalist true crime tales by including a written addendum with each portrait, combining touching details of the girls' lives with descriptions of the murders they committed. The addenda gave context to the drawings because, as she says, “If you didn't know anything, you see a teenage girl with see-through clothes.” McCarty planned on documenting all cases she found within her lifetime, but due to the birth of social media and subsequent loss of privacy controls, McCarty no longer makes these works. She now views her drawings as intimate and contextual and has no interest in her work being disseminated to millions via social media.

Due to the artist's challenging subject matter, it took a long time for her portraits to be absorbed by the art world. In an unpublished interview for The Believer, McCarty related the girls’ experiences with those of the general public by saying, “I think the struggles that these girls are fighting with, I think they are not foreign to the vast majority of us, but we don't cross that boundary.”

=== From painting to drawing ===
The “murder girls” series marked an important moment in McCarty's artistic practice as it solidified her commitment to drawing and shift from text paintings. This change was one that McCarty herself didn't foresee. For example, she said, “If you'd told me a year before I started the murder girls that I would have been doing figurative drawings, I would have told you that you were out of your mind.” Nonetheless, after completing the “murder girls” series, she was unable to stop drawing. It was drawing's association with the low-brow and its position beyond “mastership” and “master” that attracted McCarty. For example, McCarty draws with a blue ballpoint pen, which is what high-school girls use for their homework or for “doodling on their notebooks,” and it is also the preferred tool for “primate fieldwork.” Although McCarty finds the medium physically demanding (because the pressure required to keep the ink flowing when drawing on a wall may cause shoulder injuries), she continues to work with ballpoint pen and graphite, producing monumental works that speak to social and sexual inequality, the role of women, interspecies relationships, and trans biology.

=== Guggenheim Fellowship ===
In 2003, McCarty received a Guggenheim Fellowship to research a 3D immersive project, Bad Blood, which was an interactive sculpture based on the portrait of Marlene Olive from the artist's “murder girls” series. As part of her Fellowship, McCarty traveled the world speaking with experts and leading workshops at Hyper Werk Institute for Postindustrial Design in Basel, Switzerland, and the ETH in Zurich. Her project was awarded additional grants from The American Center Foundation and the Site mapping / Bundesamt für Kultur Schweiz grant for technology. Finances required to accomplish her project proved prohibitive.

=== American Fine Arts Gallery and Sikkema ===
In the early 2000s, McCarty was represented by the American Fine Arts Gallery in Soho, run by Colin de Lande, and the Bronwyn Keenan Gallery. Both galleries presented her series of poltergeist girls at home in 2002. The exhibit at Bronwyn Keenan Gallery, Young Americans, Part 2, featured McCarty's newer multi-figure drawings. One drawing was inspired by an Indiana crime case where four girls murdered a schoolmate because she was having an affair with another girl's female lover. The “murder girl” series was then exhibited in venues such as the Kunst Halle St. Gallen in Switzerland and the Museum Ludwig in Germany. Cycles of mural size drawings from this body of work were exhibited at the Istanbul Biennial and the Busan Biennale and reside in collections at the Museum of Modern Art and the Museum of Contemporary Art, Los Angeles

In 2005, the Brent Sikkema Gallery, which is now known as Sikkema, Jenkins & Co., began representing McCarty's work. In 2008, McCarty presented a major body of work under the exhibition title CANDY.CRY.STINKER.HUG. Mural size drawings that reckoned with queerness, origin, genetics, identity, and love lined the gallery. This work culminated in a monumental 2013 drawing retrospective at the Royal Hibernian Academy of Dublin, Ireland, titled Hard Keepers. These mural-sized drawings included gorillas, orangutans, and chimpanzees signing and using language. Others portray women loving and living with chimps and gorillas. Group 8 (Karisoke, The Virunga's, Rwanda. September 24, 1967. 4:30pm.) (2006) pictures a young woman, perhaps a primatologist, twined, enmeshed, and eroticized with her favorite gorilla, while group 3 (Tanjung Putting, Borneo. 1971) (2007) shows a Ph.D. candidate with the orangutan who nearly broke up her marriage. McCarty's work enters a topsy-turvy realm where love challenges all the boundaries between us, including how we define ourselves. McCarty says, “I'm trying to go places where we don't comfortably always go.” For these mural cycles, McCarty received the Pollock-Krasner grant.

In 2010 New York University’s 80WSE gallery presented the first major survey of Marlene McCarty's paintings, prints, and drawings, “i'm into you now: some work from 1980-2010.” The catalogue included essays by Kathleen Hanna, former lead singer of Le Tigre and Bikini Kill, who wrote, “Marlene's studio was wallpapered with the craziest fucking drawings I’ve ever seen. It looked like a coked up teenage girl decided to take the big pen drawings off her trapper keeper and magnifying them a thousand times. they read like sexed up... paintings advertising a new cult I desperately wanted to join. They were big as billboards obsessive and completely unapologetic.

=== Into The Weeds ===
McCarty's most recent works turn to plants to affirm ways not only to survive but also to thrive in toxic conditions.

Into The Weeds was first presented at UB Art Gallery, Center for the Arts, Buffalo, New York, where a large-scale drawing installation was accompanied by an installation of seedlings under grow lights and a large mound of soil that was home to a variety of potent plants. Mugwort, Queen Anne's lace, and jimson weed are a few of the plants that are both subject and material in Into The Weeds. At once poisonous and healing, McCarty used plants that have historically been used by women to maintain their sexual and reproductive health. Mugwort, for instance, promotes menstruation and can be used to induce abortion and regulate hormonal changes during menopause. The majority of the plants are wild and considered to be weeds.

Her drawings ruminate on masculinity, capitalism, whiteness, and their inherent toxicities, layering and merging unruly poisonous flowers with flesh and hair, using graphite and ballpoint pen. Alongside the installation, McCarty includes newsprint pamphlets identifying the plants’ poisonous properties and medicinal uses, as well as including the local history of the plants and geographical area.

To extend the project outside of the gallery walls, McCarty created a 45-foot diameter public garden of poisonous plants, with the support of UB Arts Collaboratory and Silo City. The garden, which is McCarty's first living earthwork, is under Silo City's long-term stewardship and the care of ecologist Josh Smith.

Kunsthaus Baselland, Switzerland, 2020 similarly had an installation of the artist's large-scale drawings alongside an indoor garden of powerful plants with a germination table where plants grew during the extended length of the exhibition. The third installation of this work is currently on display at Last Tango in Zurich, Switzerland.

=== Can I Borrow Your Hole at Last Tango, Zurich, Switzerland, 11 Sep – 19 Dec 2020 ===
The works in Can I Borrow Your Hole at Last Tango were produced during the COVID-19 pandemic at the time of the first major Black Lives Matter protests. The works contain some of the artist's first small drawings and are installed on placards designed to highlight the power of taking to the streets to demand institutional change. The placards make the drawings both interventionist and immersive. The titles reintroduce McCarty's earlier work with text. Using homonyms, McCarty plays with the meaning of language by imbuing the work with a complex layering, playing with the contradictions found in society and touching upon the political chaos and divisiveness of present-day America, as well as the care and collective activism witnessed in the response to the tumultuous times.

== Permanent collections ==
McCarty's work may be found in the collections of the Brooklyn Museum, the Rubell Museum, the Queens Museum, Contemporary Art Museum, Houston, the Smith College Museum of Art, the Berkeley Art Museum, and the Nasher Museum of Art. The permanent garden Into The Weeds is open to the public in Buffalo, New York.
