= Gran Fury =

U.S. AIDS activist artist collective

Silence=Death was created by Gran Fury in response to the lack of awareness regarding the AIDS pandemic.

Emerging from ACT UP (AIDS Coalition to Unleash Power) in 1988, Gran Fury was an AIDS activist artist collective from New York City consisting of 11 members including: Richard Elovich, Avram Finkelstein, Amy Heard, Tom Kalin, John Lindell, Loring McAlpin, Marlene McCarty, Donald Moffett, Michael Nesline, Mark Simpson and Robert Vazquez-Pacheco.

The participation of "visual artists in ACT UP and other collectives was essential to the effectiveness of the campaigns of protest, education and awareness about AIDS." The collective mutually disbanded in 1995, a year prior to Mark Simpson's death on November 10, 1996, from AIDS. Gran Fury organized as an autonomous collective, describing themselves as a "...band of individuals united in anger and dedicated to exploiting the power of art to end the AIDS crisis." The contribution of recycling historical images of homoerotic pleasure contributed to the pictorial landscape of the AIDS activist movement. Recycling the title of the Plymouth sedan used by New York Police Department, Richard Meyer writes, "[i]nscribed within the group's name...both a subjective experience (rage) and a tool of State power (police squad cars)," referencing "both an internal sensation and an external force". Action, not art, was the aim of the collective. Producing posters and agitprop in alliance with ACT UP to accompany the larger group's demonstration, Gran Fury served, in the words of Adam Rolston and Douglas Crimp, as ACT UP's "unofficial propaganda ministry and guerrilla graphic designers." All of Gran Fury's work is in the public domain.

== Methods ==
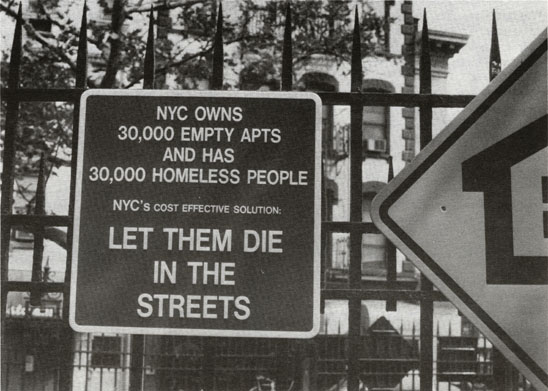
Gran Fury, Let Them Die in the Streets, 1990, enamel signage

Gran Fury's appropriation of "...commercial language for political ends became the hallmark of the artists involved." By re-purposing, reframing and re-circulating images to underscore their political agenda, Gran Fury was able to reach a plurality of identities and communities. AIDS does not discriminate, so there was an urgency to circulate information about this disease to the masses. Gran Fury member Loring McAplin observed the collectives mass-market ambition to "...fight for attention as hard as Coca-Cola fights for attention." Before social media, the collective's appropriation of mass-media language and use of various materials including: fliers, posters, stickers, T-shirts, billboards, photographs and postcards, simultaneously produced provocative, informative, stylish, political and satirical public projects. By placing "...political information into environments where people are less accustomed to finding it..." articulates member Avram Finkelstein, catches the viewer off guard, revealing a new vocabulary and a new perspective on the AIDS health crisis. In Heywood's "The Crime of Being Posi+ive", a person can be charged under the HIV Assault Act regardless of whether or not he or she infected or intended to infect another with HIV. In 1989, nine states had AIDS/HIV criminal laws, but by 2013, 32 states had these types of laws in place. Some legislatures believe that these laws are outdated since there were so many misconceived notions in the 1980s and "there was a general belief that this was potentially an epidemic that was going to spread into the general population, that was sort of a guaranteed death sentence, that was extremely transmissible." An example of a work that provokes curiosity is their public intervention project where they swapped copies of The New York Times in coin-operated dispensers with their own The New York Crimes which resembled "...The New York Times but was full of information relating to the AIDS crisis."

== Selected works ==
=== "Let the Record Show" ===
In July 1987, William Olander (1950–1989), an ACTUP member and curator of the New Museum in New York City, invited ACTUP to make an installation in "...the window by the museum entrance on Broadway". A neon SILENCE=DEATH symbol crowned the display, with a pink triangle below. The pink triangle was appropriated from the Nazi marker for gay men imprisoned at death camps furthering the analogy between the AIDS crisis and the Holocaust. The neon piece became part of the New Museum's permanent collection, and the SILENCE = DEATH graphic was widely disseminated through T-shirts, wheatpastes, and other printed ephemera. The graphic was a reaction to a 1985 editorial in The New York Times written by William F. Buckley as well as the silence by the Reagan government. Entitled Let the Record Show the work featured cardboard silhouettes of six public figures—televangelist Jerry Falwell, columnist William F. Buckley Jr., US Senator Jesse Helms, Cory Servaas of the Presidential AIDS Commission, an anonymous surgeon, and President Ronald Reagan—posited as AIDS criminals and set against a mural-sized photograph of the Nuremberg trials. Concrete slabs positioned under each figure offered evidence of their crimes, from misrepresentations of AIDS to ignoring the issue altogether as in the case of Reagan's notorious public silence, in the form of personal quotes. One reacted, for example, to a 1986 New York Times editorial by notorious arch-conservative William Buckley, who proposed that all persons with AIDS "... should be tattooed in the upper forearm, to protect common-needle users, and on the buttocks, to protect the victimization of other homosexuals."

=== "Kissing Doesn't Kill" ===
The first high-stakes opportunity for Gran Fury came as part of a public-art project called "Art Against AIDS/On the Road" in 1989. As part of the project, Gran Fury presented a poster showing three couples, of which two featured Gran Fury members Mark Simpson and Robert Vazquez-Pacheco. The couples were of varying races, sexual orientation, and genders, kissing below the line, "Kissing Doesn't Kill: Greed and Indifference Do." Within a year, the poster was found on buses and subway platforms in San Francisco, Chicago, New York and Washington, DC. With the presentation of this piece, Gran Fury began to distance itself from ACT UP's general membership, eventually organizing themselves as a closed group.

=== Venice Biennale ===
In 1990, the group became notorious for its contribution to the Venice Biennale, a.k.a. the "Pope Piece": "The artwork paired two billboard-sized panels: one coupled the image of the Pope John Paul II with a text about the church's anti-safe-sex rhetoric; the other a two-foot-high erect penis with texts about women and condom use." Typical of media indifference to the underlying issue, a May 28 New York Times report on the piece wrote "In fact, much of the talk about the Aperto among the hundreds of artists, curators, dealers and critics who have converged on this city during the last week has focused on two entries from the United States that have stirred interest more for their apparent capacity to shock than for anything else. Mr. Koons' entry is the first. The other, and for political reasons more important, is a set of posters by Gran Fury, a collective dedicated to issues involving AIDS. One poster features a photograph of the Pope flanked by a text condemning the Roman Catholic Church's policy toward sex and contraception. A week prior, Giovanni Carandente, the event's director of visual arts, said they considered excluding the poster. They told the Aperto's selection committee that they considered it to be blasphemous. Aggravating the problem was its proximity to a Gran Fury poster featuring a photograph of an erect penis (an image that would have caused more of a storm in the United States than a poster of the Pope). By Thursday, Mr. Carandente apparently reconsidered, and the posters were hanging at the Aperto. But on Saturday, the Vatican was reportedly deliberating about whether to ask the Italian Government to have the posters removed."

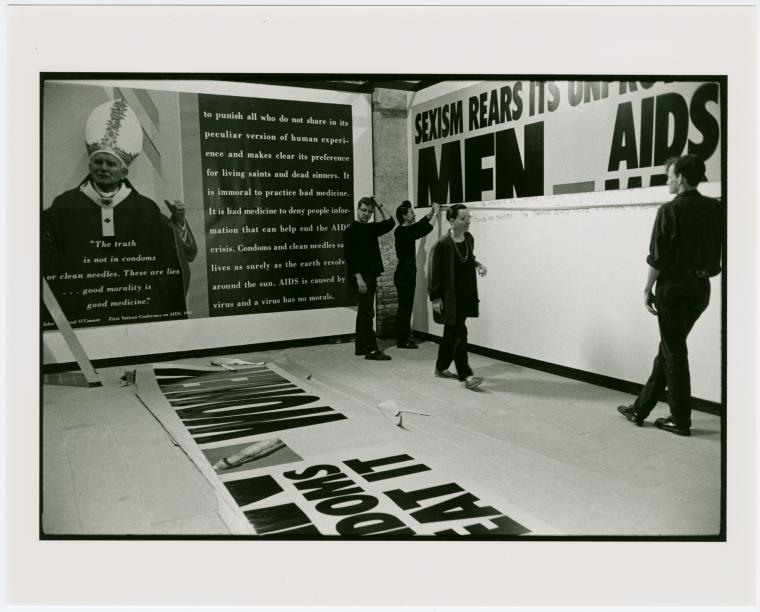
Sexism Rears Its Unprotected Head Installation

== Practicing art/activism ==
Gran Fury purposefully intervened into public and advertising spaces to disrupt the flow of normal thoughts with their own agenda. Notably, most of their work was directly exhibited to the public outside of traditional art spaces through fliers, posters, and billboards. They often recycled their own images and texts to circulate their message beyond its initial viewers.

The collective aimed to push various individuals such as Ronald Reagan, then New York Mayor Ed Koch, and John Cardinal O'Connor to address the AIDS pandemic in a more practical, open way, as well as to inform the public on the importance of safer sex and clean needles. When asked about their approach of their work, Gran Fury said: "We want the art world to recognize that collective direct action will bring an end to the AIDS crisis. ... Whenever we can, we steer the art world projects into public spaces so that we can address audiences other than museum-going audiences or the readership of art magazines." By the mid-1990s, Gran Fury found it hard to make simple works surrounding the AIDS pandemic, and started using more text - a necessity that made it hard for the group to relay messages as effectively as before. Gran Fury's final piece was entitled "Good Luck... Miss You, Gran Fury", and was produced in 1995, a year before the death of member Mark Simpson. In the piece, presented at the New Museum, Gran Fury stated that the original agitprop art strategies they were using were ‘unable to communicate the complexities of AIDS issues'.

== Participants ==
The 11 main members of Gran Fury:

- Richard Elovich
- Avram Finkelstein
- Amy Heard
- Tom Kalin
- John Lindell
- Loring McAlpin
- Marlene McCarty
- Donald Moffett
- Michael Nesline
- Mark Simpson
- Robert Vazquez-Pacheco

== Legacy ==
From January to March 2012, the 80 WSE gallery at NYU presented the exhibition, Gran Fury: Read My Lips. The exhibition consisted of 15 pieces, most of which were re-created by Gran Fury from archival documentation. The show was accompanied by an 88-page catalogue, which was the first publication devoted to the group's production. Works in Gran Fury: Read My Lips. included, "Kissing Doesn't Kill", "Welcome to America", and "Women Don't Get Aids", reproduced in large-scale mural formats. There were also projections of "Kissing Doesn't Kills" video public service announcements, and several give-aways including "Men use Condoms" stickers in an edition of 3000 and postcards from the "Read My Lips" series.

In April 2022, Bold Type Books published a history of Gran Fury by Jack Lowery entitled, It Was Vulgar & It Was Beautiful: How AIDS Activists Used Art to Fight a Pandemic. In 2024, accompanying the exhibition of the same name at the São Paulo Museum of Art, the catalog Gran Fury: Art Is Not Enough was published, edited by Adriano Pedrosa and André Mesquita, with texts by Mesquita, David Deitcher, Douglas Crimp, Gran Fury, Marcos Martins, and Vinicius Franco, as a comprehensive survey of the collective's history and work.
