= Richard Elovich =

Social psychologist, writer, performance artist, and AIDS activist (born 1954)

Richard Elovich (born 1954) is a social psychologist, writer, performance artist, and AIDS activist focusing on harm reduction and low-threshold approaches to drug treatment.

== Early life ==
A student at New York University from 1973 to 1975, Elovich dropped out to pursue life as a writer and artist after meeting William S Burroughs through his job at the Manhattan bookstore and cultural center, the Gotham Book Mart. Elovich worked as a secretary to poet Allen Ginsberg, and lived in the former YMCA building at 222 Bowery where Burroughs and poet John Giorno lived, and where Mark Rothko had painted his Seagrams murals in the former gymnasium. In 1976, Elovich joined Ginsberg, Burroughs and Tibetan Lama Chögyam Trungpa in residence at the Hotel Boulderado, assisting Ginsberg and Burroughs with teaching duties at the Jack Keroauc School of Disembodied Poetics at Naropa University, and driving Burroughs to Denver to see his son William Burroughs Jr., who was recovering from a liver transplant. Elovich became an assistant to artist Jasper Johns from 1978 to 1982, and briefly in 1983, for poet John Ashbery.

== Writing, curating and performance ==
Elovich began writing for downtown magazines including Bomb, City Moon, Roof, Gay Sunshine Press and The World from the mid-1970s, and in 1980–1981 served as an art critic for The Burlington magazine. In 1984, Elovich was dramaturge for the inaugural performance of Robert Wilson and David Byrne's The Knee Plays in Minneapolis, and conducted interviews with Ann Waldman, William S. Burroughs, Allen Ginsberg and others for a volume on William S. Burroughs Jr. With Jim Self, a dancer from the Merce Cunningham company, Elovich collaborated on performances combining movement and text at The Kitchen (New Zuyder Zee, and Lookout, 1985). In 1986, poet Eileen Myles invited Elovich to curate performance at the St. Marks Poetry Project, and Elovich also began writing and staging his own work, including Ivan and the Lamp (1986), What the Water Gave Me (1986), My Hat It Has Three Corners (1986, with dancer Yvonne Meier), Bobby's Birthday Like That (1987) and Faking House (1987, with Pat Oleszko) at venues including PS 122, Danspace, BACA downtown and the Performing Garage. In 1987 Elovich was hired as the first administrative director of Movement Research, the dance organization focused on improvisation and experimentation, where he established the Performance Journal and an artist-in-residence program while continuing to write and perform one-man shows (A Man Cannot Jump Over His Own Shadow (1988), If Men Could Talk, the Stories They Could Tell (1990). Elovich organized other performance artists to challenge the 1990 decision by the National Endowment for the Arts chairman John Frohnmayer to defund four whose work included explicit sexual content, donating part of his own NEA award to support those defunded and charging the NEA with homophobia in an oped coauthored with Holly Hughes in the New York Times. NEA funding for Movement Research itself was the center of controversy in 1991 when conservative Senator Jesse Helms, outraged by the content in the gender and sexuality issue of the Performance Journal Three, had copies delivered to every Senator's office so they could appreciate the "filth and rottenness" of publicly funded art. Someone Else from Queens is Queer, Elovich's one-man play examining the intersection of AIDS activism, gay and Jewish identies in New York, won the Bessie Award in 1991, and led to an invitation to the Sundance Institute's screenwriters lab and to perform at the 1997 Sundance Film Festival. Elovich has a cameo in Tom Kalin's film Swoon, and performed in Charles Atlas's live TV broadcast "We Interrupt This Program."

== HIV activism and organizing ==
In 1988, Elovich became a member of the AIDS activist group ACT UP, working first with other Treatment and Data Committee members to start the AIDS Treatment Registry compiling lists of clinical trial sites for people with HIV. Elovich drew on his own experience of injecting drug use in his activism, challenging the head of the National Institute of Allergy and Infectious Disease, Dr. Anthony Fauci, at a public meeting where Dr. Fauci dismissed people who injected drugs as a "noncompliant" population ineligible for inclusion in clinical trials. Elovich's activism generally sought to challenge assertions that people who use drugs were incapable of rational or healthy choices, and he was an organizer for ACT UP of needle exchange, then illegal in New York City. As a result, Elovich and other members of ACT UP and the National AIDS Brigade were arrested in 1990 for violation of laws prohibiting possession of injecting paraphernalia. Elovich and other defendants subsequently known as the "needle 8' – including Gregg Bordowitz, Cynthia Cochran, Debra Levine, Kathy Otter, Jon Parker, Monica Pearl, and Dan Keith William—were tried in 1990–1991, with Elovich representing himself and convincing former New York City Health Commissioner Stephen C. Joseph to testify on behalf of the defendants. The judge found that the group's actions were justified through the "necessity" defense, which allows for the breaking of a law in an emergency to prevent a greater imminent public harm, and the ruling paved the way for the beginning of community-based needle exchange programs in New York. Elovich was also a member of Gran Fury, the AIDS activist artist collective who used techniques of advertising and propaganda to urge action on key policy issues. He later collaborated with Gran Fury members Donald Moffett and Marlene McCarty to produce publications and posters for gay men's HIV prevention.

In 1990, Elovich was appointed by New York mayors Dinkins and Giuliani as a chair of the Alcohol and Drugs working group of New York City's Ryan White Planning Council, which disbursed more than $330M million in federal assistance for HIV programming, and where he advocated a new "recovery readiness" approach to engage people using drugs without requiring abstinence. Elovich joined the policy department of Gay Men's Health Crisis, the nation's first and largest AIDS organization, and became the founding director of GMHC's substance use counseling and education program in 1994 and the director of HIV prevention in 1996. His work included creation of programs for HIV negative men, Black men, and Latino men, and urged a move beyond universal calls for condom use to considering social dynamics and context for HIV risk behavior. In 1994, Elovich successfully secured $2.1M in funding for gay men's HIV prevention from New York State, the first funding for gay health included in the New York State budget. He authored the New York State curriculum on harm reduction, an approach that helped people unable or unwilling to stop using drugs to make positive change, and produced a series of videos on HIV and drug use with Gregg Bordowitz including Clean Needles Save Lives (1991). The gay men's sexual health survey conducted by GMHC and the New York City Health department found decreased HIV infection and increased use of safer sex, and was hailed on the front and editorial pages of the New York Times in 1999 as the largest such study in history.

== International work on substance use and drugs programming ==
Elovich trained as a researcher at Columbia University, receiving his PhD in 2008. His award-winning dissertation and subsequent years of professional work focused on narcology, the subspecialty of Soviet psychiatry authorized to treat addiction, and on the tensions between rigid health systems and lived experiences of people who use drugs in countries of the former Soviet Union and Asia. As a senior consultant for Open Society Foundations, he pioneered overdose prevention and other new approaches to address problematic substance use in Central Asia, helped design the Kazakhstan AIDS program funded through the Global Fund to Fight AIDS, TB and Malaria, and helped create programs in Indonesia, Nepal, and Ukraine. He was a critic of the impact of the Russian invasion of Crimea, which resulted in closure of a pioneering program providing opioid substitution treatment, and of the general inability of narcology to respond effectively to HIV epidemics concentrated among people who inject drugs in post-Soviet countries. He has also been critical of international donor practices, including US failure to protect a grantee detained on false charges in Uzbekistan. As with HIV prevention, he has advocated for greater attention to context and particularities in responses to drug use or descriptions of "addicts," and for public health programs to be aware of how often they stand "in the footprint of drug control", mimicking law enforcement's inclination to control and contain.
