= Guy Overfelt =

American artist (born 1977)

Guy Overfelt (born 1977, in Baltimore) is an American multi-disciplinary post-conceptual artist. He works with various media including sculpture, performance, photography, video and drawing. He is based in San Francisco and Bolinas, California.

== Biography ==
Overfelt received a B.F.A. degree from the Maryland Institute College of Art; and an M.F.A. degree from San Francisco Art Institute.

Best known for his burnout works made using a 1977 Pontiac Trans AM as an artist's utensil and subject matter, San Francisco-based Guy Overfelt’s projects are raucous explorations of the American Dream via car culture. His body of work presents a special mix of printmaking, performance and sculpture that investigates the modern industrial complex by expropriating the symbolic brands of automotive corporations.

Guy Overfelt’s work has been exhibited internationally in galleries and museums including the Oakland Museum of California; Guangzhou Triennial, China; St. Mary's University, Halifax, Canada; The Havana Biennial, Cuba; Ronald Feldman Fine Arts, New York; Jack Hanley Gallery, San Francisco, and White Columns, New York City. His work has been acquired by the Berkeley Museum Collection and the JPMorgan Chase Collection, as well as private collections. His work has been reviewed and featured in numerous publications, including the New Yorker, The New York Times, Art Net, Art Papers, Index Magazine, Paper Magazine, Time Out, Kobe Japan, Time Out, New York, Boing Boing, SF Guardian, Surface Magazine, and the San Francisco Chronicle, as well as other publications and catalogs. His work was featured in the documentary film ‘Burning Rubber’ which recently aired on Bravo.

== Solo exhibitions ==
- Four Real Walls, Four Walls Gallery, San Francisco, California (1997)
- Project Evidence, White Columns, White Room, New York City, New York (1997)
- SBMA, Bronwyn Keenan Gallery, New York City, New York (1998)
- Burn-Out Trial, San Francisco Hall of Justice, San Francisco, California(1998)
- The World #54, The Poetry Project, Taser Project, Summer (repro)., New York City, New York (1998)
- Game Over, Bronwyn Keenan Gallery, New York City, New York (1999)
- Free Beer, Refusalon Gallery, San Francisco, California (1999)
- Cruzen USA, Jack Hanley Gallery, San Francisco, California(2000)
- Deluxe, Refusalon Gallery, San Francisco, California (with Tony Labat and Mads Lynnerup) (2000)
- Destroy, First Vienna Austrotel Contemporary Art Fair, Vienna, Austria (2000)
- Sons of Liberty Tour, Charas/El Bohio, New York City, New York (with Sabbra Cadabra / world's greatest Black Sabbath tribute band) (2001)
- Bongzilla, Detour 888 Gallery, San Francisco, California (curated series Prime Time / Tony Labat) (2001)
- PowerSlave, eyelevel gallery, Halifax, N.S., Canada (2002)
- Nova G.O., Linc Art, San Francisco, California (with Nils Nova) (2004)
- Highway To Hell, Garage Biennale, San Francisco, California (with Heather Sparks) (2008)
- Freebird, Oakland Museum of California, Oakland, California (2010)
- Ever Wash, Ever Gold Gallery, San Francisco, California (2011)
- "ASSED OUT AND THE MINI DRAMAS", Queens Nails Projects, San Francisco, California (with Andrew McClintock) (2012)

== Group exhibitions ==
- Basel Art Fair, Kunsthalle, Basel, Switzerland (curator: Daniella Salvioni) (1998)
- Achieving Failure: Gym Culture 2000, Thread Waxing Space, New York City, New York (curator: Bill Arning) (2000)
- Wine, Women and Wheels, White Columns, New York City, New York (curator: Paul Ha) (2000)
- Action Jackson, Silverstein Gallery, New York City, New York (curator: David Hunt) (2001)
- Marked, Hunter College, New York City, New York (curator: Heidi Zuckerman Jacobson (2001)
- American Dream: A Survey, Ronald Feldman Fine Arts, New York City, New York (2003)
- Performance Anxiety, Berkeley Art Museum and Pacific Film Archive, Berkeley, California (2004)
- Burning Rubber, St. Mary's University, Halifax, Nova Scotia, Canada (2007)
- A THIN SLICE, Baer Ridgway Exhibitions, San Francisco, California (2009)
- Warhol Revisited?, De Young Museum + OFF Space, Oakland, California (2009)
- "Radical Light: That Little Red Dot", Artists' Television Access, San Francisco, California (2011)
- (presented by SF Cinemathque and Berkeley Art Museum & Pacific Film Archive) (2011)
- Who Dares Wins, Butcher's Daughter Contemporary Art, Detroit, Michigan (curator: Monica Bowman) (2011)
- Spread - Conceptualism Then and Now, SOMArts Gallery, San Francisco, California (2011)
- "Water McBeer", Ever Gold Gallery, San Francisco, California (2011)
- "I AM CRIME", SOMArts Gallery, San Francisco, California (2012)
