= Dance of the Almeh =

Painting by Jean-Léon Gérôme

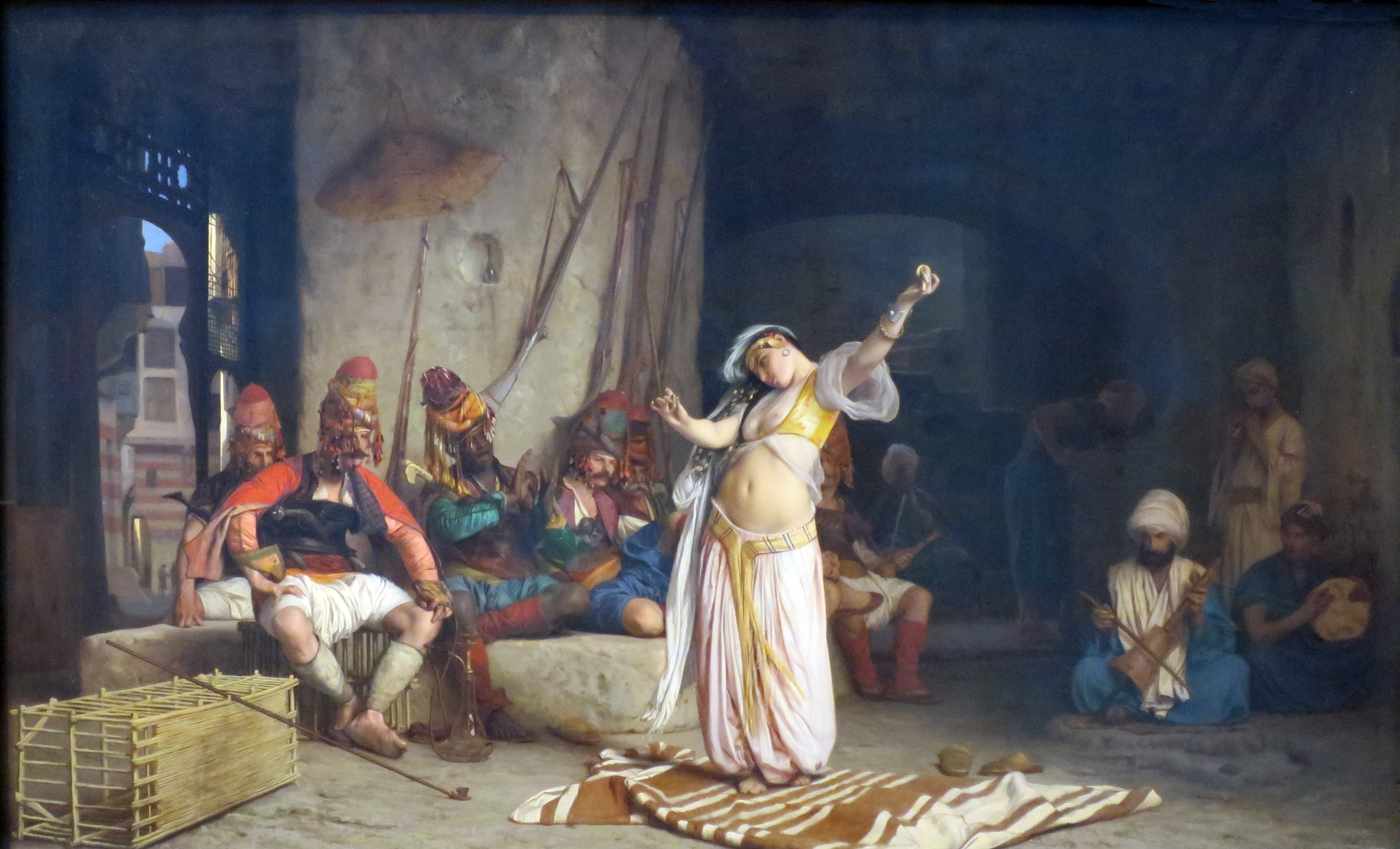
- Artist: Jean-Léon Gérôme
- Year: 1863
- Medium: Oil on panel, genre painting
- Dimensions: 50 cm × 81 cm (20 in × 32 in)
- Location: Dayton Art Institute, Ohio

Dance of the Almeh (French: La danse de l'almée) is an 1863 genre painting by the French artist Jean-Léon Gérôme. It depicts the performance of an Almah belly dancer accompanied by musicians. Stylistically it reflects the fashionable Orientalism of the era, as well as the realism of many of Gérôme's works. Gérôme displayed the painting at the Salon of 1864 in Paris, where it generated a degree of controversy amongst those who felt it was "immoral". Today it is in the collection of the Dayton Art Institute in Ohio.

== Bibliography ==
- Allan, Scott & Morton, Mary G. Reconsidering Gérôme. Getty Publications, 2010.
- Ackerman, Gerald M. The Life and Work of Jean-Léon Gérôme. Sotheby's Publications, 1986.
- Pal-Lapinski, Piya. The Exotic Woman in Nineteenth-century British Fiction and Culture: A Reconsideratio. University Press of New England, 2005.
