= Alison Van Pelt =

American painter (born 1963)

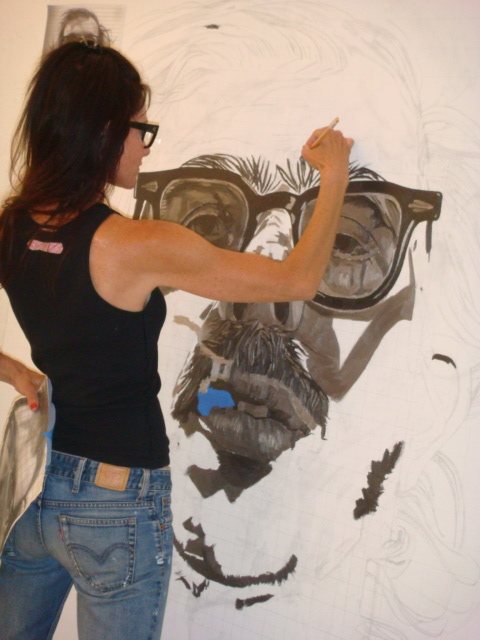
- Portrait of Chuck Close. Image reveals painstaking details that are then just as painstakingly blurred in finished portrait below.
- Born: September 16, 1963 (age 62); Los Angeles
- Known for: contemporary artist
- Website: www.alisonvanpelt.com

Alison Van Pelt (born September 16, 1963) is an American painter. Trained in Los Angeles and Florence, Van Pelt is established as a contemporary artist whose work is informed by expressionism, minimalism and pop art.

== Biography ==
Van Pelt was born and raised in California and grew up in Los Angeles, where she attended the University of California at Los Angeles. She came of age in the 1970s and her distinctive photorealist painting style is evocative of that era, when photography was assimilated into the art world. Painters—Richard Estes, Denis Peterson, Audrey Flack and Chuck Close among them—would create paintings that appeared to be photographs. Van Pelt begins by referencing a photograph or other existing image from which she draws and paints a realistic portrait entirely by hand. Next comes the work of obscuring the carefully rendered image. From a distance the image appears soft, as though photographed through a mist. But as the viewer approaches the work, vertical lines can be seen, and on closer inspection a sort of horizontal weave emerges. One writer described the effect this creates on Van Pelt’s The Expulsion of Adam and Eve as, "so thick with paint and lines that it actually appears to have been applied to wood, not canvas.

In response to the observation that her work is abstract, Van Pelt has said, "It’s my way of merging the tradition of portraiture with contemporary abstraction. I’m interested in ambiguity." A sublime tension is created in the contradiction between the crisp photorealism with which she first delineates her subject and the purposeful act of obscuring this subject, which ensues. Viewed up close, a grid of ambiguous color meets the eye, but with distance the viewer gains the necessary objectivity to discern the subject. However, even with this revelation, a question remains as one writer so aptly noted: "Are the figures stepping forth into the tangible world or are they receding into the depths of the canvas?"

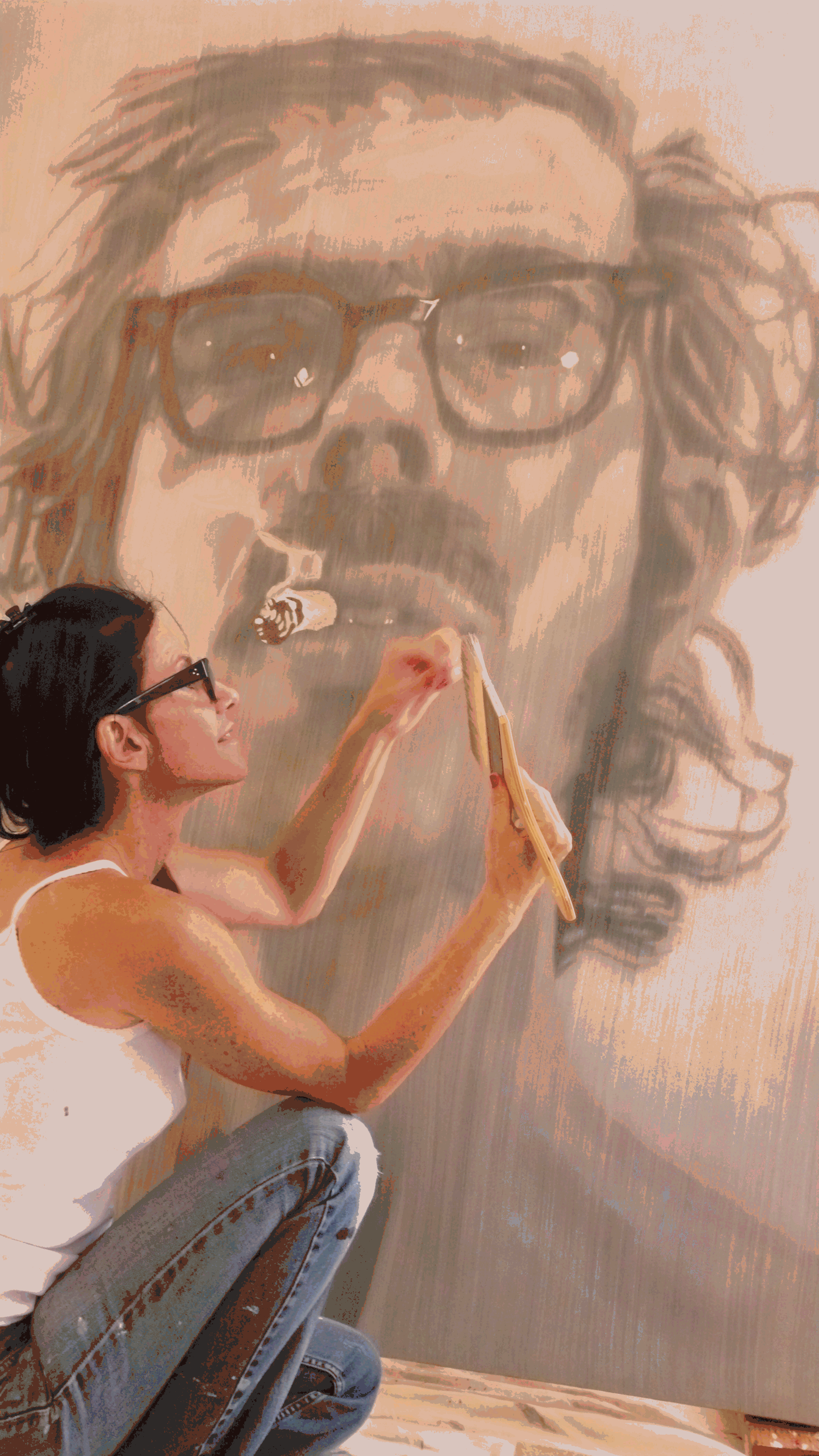

The impetus for this creative tension has its origins in a visit to Paris in 1988. At the Beaubourg at Centre Georges Pompidou, Van Pelt was captivated by the way Francis Bacon had smeared the paint on the face of one of his subjects, and that same evening found a postcard in which the nighttime streetlights appeared as blurry lines. After she returned home to California, the memory of these two images led Van Pelt to experiment with blurring the paint on a portrait of a woman’s face. Her style had coalesced. Her technique caught the attention of Los Angeles dealer Robert Berman, whose gallery exhibited several solo shows of Van Pelt’s work.

In 1992, Van Pelt traveled to Florence, Italy to study painting at the Florence Academy of Art, where the ethereal style of her work prompted comparisons to the Shroud of Turin. During the two years she spent studying abroad, she showed her work in solo exhibitions overseas: the show New Work appeared at Galerie Paul Sties in Krönberg, Germany, New Paintings at Galerie Lauter in Mannheim, Germany, and Les Animaux Nouveaux at Galerie Vedovi in Brussels.

Van Pelt’s portrait of William S. Burroughs welcomed visitors to Ports of Entry, an exhibit of Burroughs’ work held at Los Angeles County Museum of Art in 1996. The Beat Generation hero’s portrait, which appears on the cover for his book, has been described as a ghost-like image. One journalist described Van Pelt’s portrait of Burroughs as "peering out at us with his trademark craggy deadpan, looking characteristically haunted." A Parisian art collector, who also videotapes séances claimed that her paintings looked exactly like the ghosts he records.

== Influences ==
Despite the interest that the visceral nature of Bacon’s paintings initially sparked, in comparison, Van Pelt’s work evokes a more languid approach to her subjects... Gerhard Richter and Mark Rothko are among the artists who have exercised considerable influence on Van Pelt’s technique. More than one reviewer has noted that her portraits recall Richter’s blurred portraits of the infamous RAF members embroiled in the Baader-Meinhof scandal in the 1970s, but without the dark political associations. Nancy Burson’s composite portraits also come to mind. The line and grid work of Agnes Martin sparked Van Pelt’s meticulous attention to detail in which Van Pelt places as much focus on each brush stroke as she does on a piece of work in its entirety. Van Pelt has said that Plato’s universal flow resonates for her.
