= Shafiqa al-Qibtiyya =

Egyptian dancer (1851–1926)

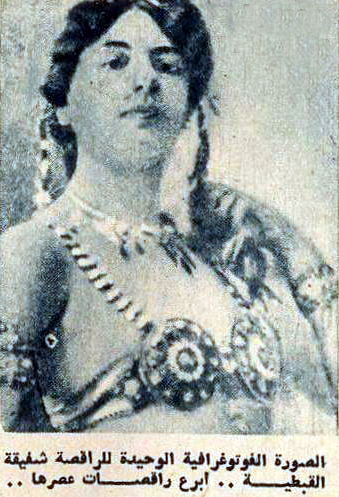
- Shafiqa al-Qibtiyya
- Born: 1851; Cairo, Ottoman Egypt
- Died: 1926 (aged 74–75)
- Dancing career
- Dances: Belly dance

Shafiqa al-Qibtiyya or Shafiqa the Copt (1851–1926) was an Egyptian belly dancer and one of the first female owners of a night club in Cairo of the late 19th century. Due to her success in Egypt and abroad, she is known as the first internationally famous belly dancer.

In 1963 Hassan el-Imam based his film Shafiqa al-Qibtiyya on her life and career.

== Life ==
=== Early life ===
Later known by her stage name Shafiqa al-Qibtiyya, she was born in a Coptic family in Cairo in Egypt. She was trained by the ghawazi dancer Shawq, despite her family's disapproval. When taking lessons with Shawq on Sundays, she told her parents she was going to a local church. When she decided to become a professional dancer, she ran away to the Mediterranean Coast to perform at local saint's festivals, also known as mawlids. Finally, she returned to Cairo to join Shawq's troupe performing at weddings and private parties.

=== Career ===
A talented performer with a devoted following, she was admired by regular patrons of Egypt's elite. She was one of the first female cabaret owners in Cairo's entertainment district Azbakeya, where she and other female cabaret-owners, singers, and actresses dominated public life for decades. Along with Mounira El Mahdeya and others, she became a famous performer in the newly founded theatres and night clubs, notably the El Dorado, and also founded her own club, Alf Leyla.

Al-Qibtiyya was the first belly dancer to become famous outside of Egypt and also travelled abroad to perform in Paris, France. She is credited as the first performer of the “Dance of the Candlesticks,” where a belly dancer balances a candelabra (venyara or shamadan) on her head while performing. This has been disputed by professionials such as the late Mahmoud Reda, who believed that Turkish acrobats could have been performing this act before Al-Qibtiyya. The routine also features champagne glasses rhythmically clinking on the dancer's stomach as it moves.

== Legacy ==
Hassan el-Imam's 1963 film Shafiqa al-Qibtiyya (Shafiqa the Copt) transformed Al-Qibtiyya into a symbol of late 19th-century Cairo's glamorous nightlife, turning her into a mythical figure known for her talent and flamboyant persona, making it difficult to distinguish the facts of her life from fiction.
