= Bronwyn Keenan Gallery =

Coordinates: 40.7197°N 74.0005°W

Bronwyn Keenan Gallery (1995–2004) was an art gallery located initially at 494 Broadway and finally at #3 Crosby Street, in the SoHo district of New York City. Run by Bronx-born Bronwyn Keenan, the gallery showed emerging artists from the mid to late 1990s and into the early 2000s. Many now notable artists had early shows there including Carol Bove, Ion Birch, Jeremy Blake, Mari Eastman, Eve Sussman, Liz Deschenes, Michael Ashkin, Brad Kahlhamer, Mark Bennett, Enoc Perez, Michael Seymour, Katherine Bernhardt, Guy Overfelt and others. Bronwyn Keenan began her career in art at Christie's East. After the Bronwyn Keenan Gallery closed, she went on to direct special events at the Guggenheim Museum and the Metropolitan Museum of Art. From 2019-2022, Keenan developed and directed the arts initiative--UB Arts Collaboratory--at the University at Buffalo. She is currently the Studio Director for Laura Owens Studio in Los Angeles.
