= High Noon (Hopper) =

1949 painting by Edward Hopper

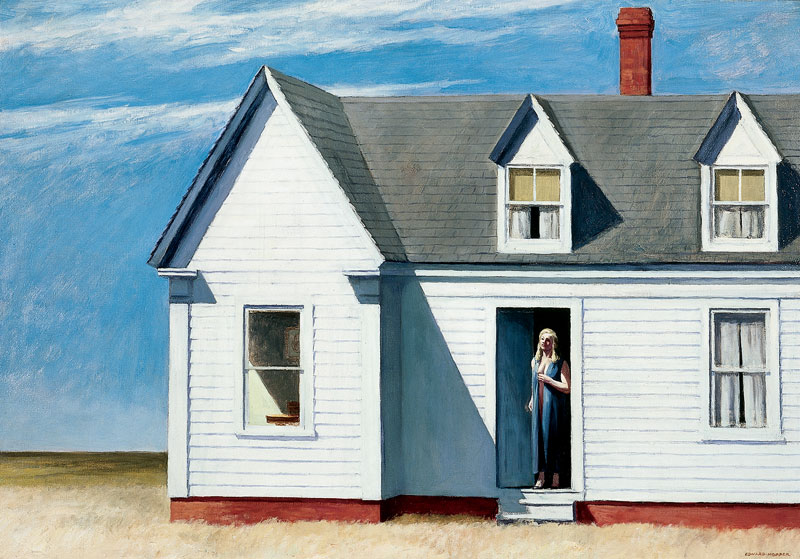
- Artist: Edward Hopper
- Year: 1949
- Movement: American Realism
- Subject: Woman in doorway of Colonial Revival home
- Dimensions: 27 1/2 x 39 1/2 inches
- Location: Dayton Art Institute, Dayton
- Owner: Dayton Art Institute, gifted by Anthony Haswell

High Noon is a 1949 oil painting by the American Realist artist Edward Hopper, created in 1949. The work depicts a woman standing and staring outward from the doorway of a home, with the sun casting a split shadow over the home.

== Description ==
At first glance, the features in the painting seem clear enough. A half-dressed woman stands at the front door, apparently waiting for someone or something. But the painting is complex, both psychologically and aesthetically. Hopper uses the image of a woman for an aesthetic exploration of light and shadow: the shadows on her body are an extension of the geometric shadows in the house. On the other hand, the light gives the impression of detachment: the white walls contrast sharply with the blue sky and the red chimney and foundation of the house, and in this light the woman is illuminated like if focused by a spotlight. The effect is almost obscene. Her dressing gown is not wrapped, which gives an almost complete picture of her nakedness, and the verticals of the dressing gown and its opening correspond to the verticals of the doorway and the door and the gap in the curtains by the window above.

== See also ==
- List of works by Edward Hopper
