= Silence=Death Project =

Social project of the AIDS crisis

- An example of the 1986 Silence=Death poster from the AIDS crisis (designed by the Silence=Death Project, formed in 1985) illustrating the use of an inverted version of the pink triangle from the Holocaust
- Type of project: Political
- Location: New York City, New York
- Founder: Avram Finkelstein, Jorge Socárras, Chris Lione, Charles Kreloff, Oliver Johnston, and Brian Howard
- Country: United States
- Established: 1985

The Silence=Death Project was a consciousness-raising group involved in raising awareness about the AIDS crisis during the Reagan administration. It was best known for its iconic political poster and was the work of a six-person collective in New York City: Avram Finkelstein, Brian Howard, Oliver Johnston, Charles Kreloff, Chris Lione, and Jorge Socárras.

== Formation ==
The Silence=Death Project was founded in 1985 by Avram Finkelstein, Jorge Socárras, Chris Lione, Charles Kreloff, Oliver Johnston, and Brian Howard during the AIDS crisis as a consciousness-raising group, and as a means of mutual support. The content of their discussions quickly turned political. Inspired by posters made by the Art Workers Coalition and the Guerrilla Girls, the group decided to create their own poster to be wheatpasted around New York City. Rejecting any photographic image as necessarily exclusionary, the group decided to use more abstract language in an attempt to reach multiple audiences. In 1986, they created the Silence=Death poster using the title phrase and a pink triangle, known from its association with the persecution of homosexuals in Nazi Germany in the 1930s and 1940s.

The first printing of the poster contained several errors in the smaller text at the bottom. Two government agencies (the CDC and the FDA) were spelled out as "The Center for Disease Control" as opposed to the "Centers" and it also read "Federal Drug Administration" instead of "Food and Drug Administration". The poster originally hit the streets in mid-March 1987, less than a month before ACT UP (AIDS Coalition to Unleash Power) was formed. The Collective eventually turned the rights of the poster to ACT UP who reprinted it, first without making any changes, but then reprinted it, again, with the correct names of the government agencies.

== ACT UP ==
The Silence=Death poster was later used by the AIDS Coalition to Unleash Power (ACT UP) as a central image in their activist campaign against the AIDS epidemic. Because of ACT UP's advocacy, the pink triangle remains synonymous with AIDS activism. In chants and other messages, some activists chose to use the phrase "silence equals death" accompanied by "action equals life". In 2017, the image was reinstalled in the windows of the Leslie Lohman Museum of Gay and Lesbian Art with a new line at the bottom: "Be Vigilant. Refuse. Resist".

== See also ==
- AIDS–Holocaust metaphor
