= Avram Finkelstein =

American artist, writer and activist

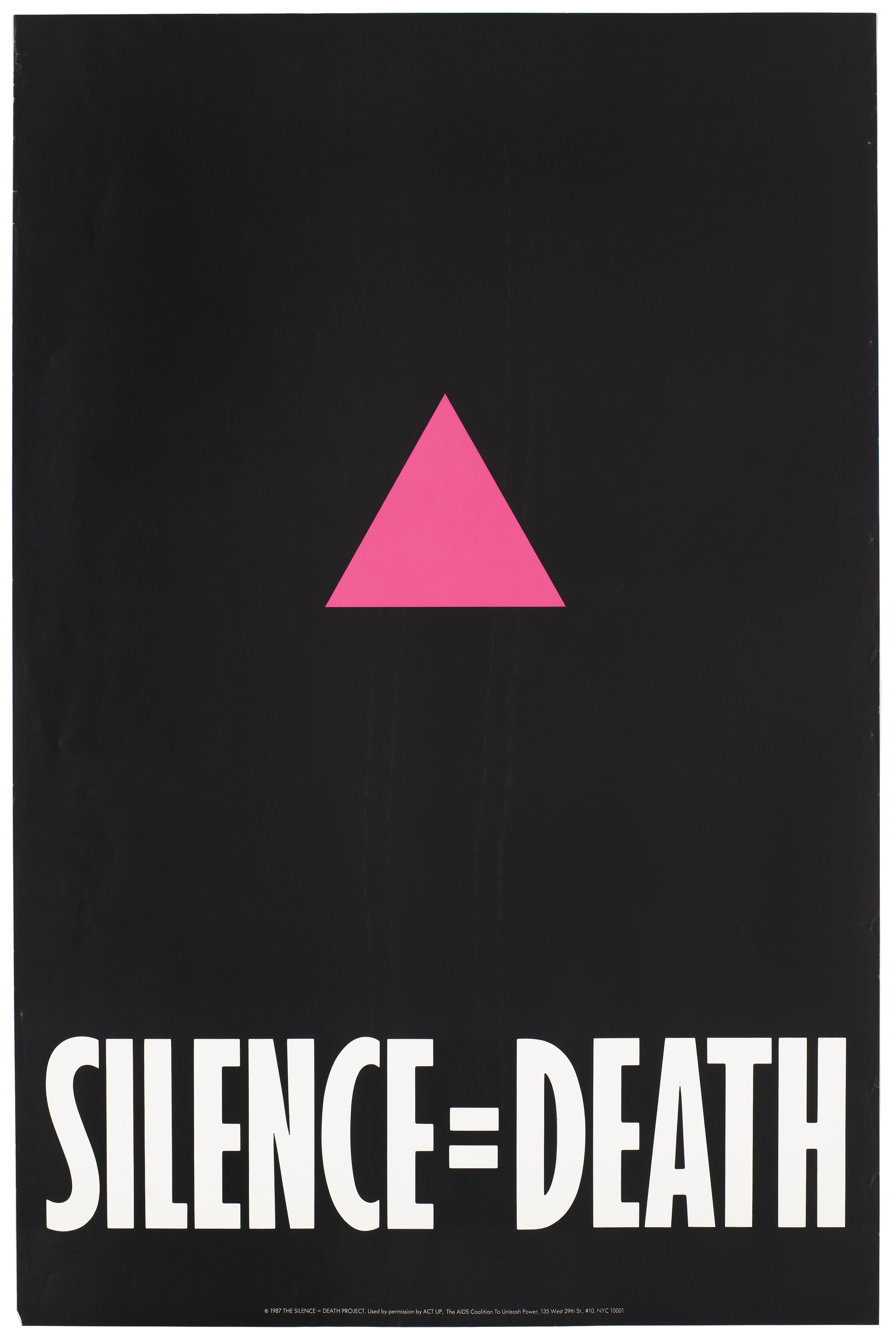
- Poster of the Silence=Death Project
- Occupations: Artist; Writer
- Organization: Gran Fury
- Known for: Gay rights activism

Avram Finkelstein is an American artist, writer, gay rights activist and member of the AIDS art collective Gran Fury.

Finkelstein describes himself as a "red diaper baby", raised by leftist parents who encouraged him to develop an interest in radical politics. He began by protesting against the Vietnam War in the 1960s, and has worked on many activist causes, including The Student Mobilization Committee, The Poor People's Campaign and The Coalition for Lesbian and Gay Rights. He was a founding member of the AIDS advocacy group ACT UP. In 1986, Finkelstein was a co-founder of the group Silence=Death Project, which created the "Silence=Death" anti-AIDS logo to combat institutional silence surrounding homophobia and HIV/AIDS, later donated to ACT UP. In 1994, in preparation for the Gay Games in New York City, he wrote a tract for ACT UP, entitled "Welcome to New York", which asked gay men and lesbians who attended the games and other festivities surrounding the twenty-fifth anniversary of the Stonewall Riots to take action to stop the AIDS epidemic.

In 2018, Finkelstein created "YOU CARE ABOUT HIV CRIMINALIZATION (YOU JUST DON’T KNOW IT YET)", a broadside and site-specific project for Visual AIDS and the 2018 New York City Pride March.

Finkelstein has covered art and culture for Artwrit, Italian Vogue, Dazed and Confused, Visionaire, Pride, Genre, Van and Dune. With Gran Fury, he collaborated on public awareness campaigns and public art projects for publications, museums and foundations including the Whitney Museum of American Art, the Venice Biennale, ArtForum, the New Museum of Contemporary Art, Creative Time and the Public Art Fund. Finkelstein has been interviewed about art, activism and communication in the public sphere by publications including The New York Times, Interview, and The Forward and has spoken at Harvard, Exit Art, Fordham, Rhode Island School of Design, Massachusetts College of Art and Design, the School of Visual Arts and City University of New York.

Finkelstein's archive can be found at the Fales Library and Special Collections at New York University.
