= Donald Moffett =

American painter (born 1955)

Lot 010212 (the double hazard), oil on linen with wood panel support, concrete statuary, wood timbers, acrylic paint on burlap, gaffers tape, wire, steel I beam, hardware (69 × 87 × 57 inches)

Lot 122811 (the double extension), oil on linen with wood panel support, w/cast iron flanges, common black pipe, hardware (21 × 17 × 21 inches)

Donald Moffett (born January 20, 1955) is an American painter.

== Personal life ==
Moffett was born in San Antonio, Texas, where he studied art and biology at Trinity University, earning a BA. He lives and works in New York City.

Moffett is a founding member of Gran Fury, the artistic arm of the AIDS activist group ACT UP. On May 20, 2011, Gran Fury received an Honorary Doctorate of Fine Arts from Massachusetts College of Art and Design.

Moffett is represented by Marianne Boesky Gallery in New York, and Anthony Meier Fine Arts in San Francisco.

== Work ==
As a painter, Moffett extends the traditional two-dimensional frame through non-traditional techniques such as prying open the canvas to paint the backside, perforating or suturing the painting's surface, or loading it with paint forced into extreme textures. At other times, he transposes paintings into screens by incorporating video projections onto the canvas.

The subject matter of his paintings have been described as being poetic, provocative, and at times humorous. His influence by classical painters, such as Goya and Manet, manifests in his blending of the subtle with the outlandish and structural experimentation, along with social critique. Moffett's artwork focuses on contemporary topics and universal issues of love, loss, alienation, and death.

== Selected catalogues and publications ==
- Strange Ways: Here We Come. Donald Moffett & Felix Gonzalez Torres. Vancouver: University of British Columbia Fine Arts Gallery (1990).
- The Inward Eye: Transcendence in Contemporary Art. Houston: Contemporary Arts Museum (2002).
- Donald Moffett: What Barbara Jordan Wore. Chicago: Museum of Contemporary Art (2002).
- Image Stream. Columbus, OH: Wexner Center for the Arts, The Ohio State University (2003).
- Festschrift: Selections from a Collection. Hartford, CT: Leo Press (2008).
- The Judith Rothschild Foundation Catalogue Raisonné. New York: The Museum of Modern Art (2009).
- Everywhere. Sexual Diversity Policies in Art. Santiago de Compostela, Spain: Centro Galego de Arte Contemporánea (2009).
- Donald Moffett: The Extravagant Vein. Houston: Contemporary Arts Museum (2011).<ref[>http://www.rizzoliusa.com/book.php?isbn=9780847837274/Rizzoli USA] </ref>
- Donald Moffett: The Radiant Future, Exhibition Catalogue. Columbus, OH: Columbus College of Art and Design (2012).

== Exhibitions ==
- 2017-2018: Range: Experiments in New York, 1961–2007, the Metropolitan Museum of Art, New York
- 2011-2012: The Extravagant Vein, mid-career survey exhibition, traveled to Contemporary Arts Museum Houston; Frances Young Tang Teaching Museum and Art Gallery, Skidmore College (Saratoga Springs, NY); and Andy Warhol Museum, Pittsburgh, PA.
- 2002: Donald Moffett: What Barbara Jordan Wore, Museum of Contemporary Art, Chicago

== Writings and interviews ==
- Moffett, Donald. "Sex with Sheila Hicks". Art in America, November 30, 2012.
- Dunkerley Dialogue: Donald Moffett with Mason Stokes. Tang Museum, 2012.
- Donald Moffett on This Will Have Been: Art, Love & Politics in the 1980s. Museum of Contemporary Art Chicago, March 21, 2012.
- "Troy Schulze Chats with Donald Moffett". NPR, November 28, 2011.

== Permanent collections ==
- Whitney Museum of American Art, New York
- Museum of Modern Art, New York
- Museum of Contemporary Art, Los Angeles
- Museum of Fine Arts, Boston
- Walker Art Center, Minneapolis
- Museum of Contemporary Art, Chicago
- Modern Art Museum of Fort Worth
- Blanton Museum of Art, Austin
- Metropolitan Museum of Art, New York
