= Jay Blotcher =

American activist and journalist

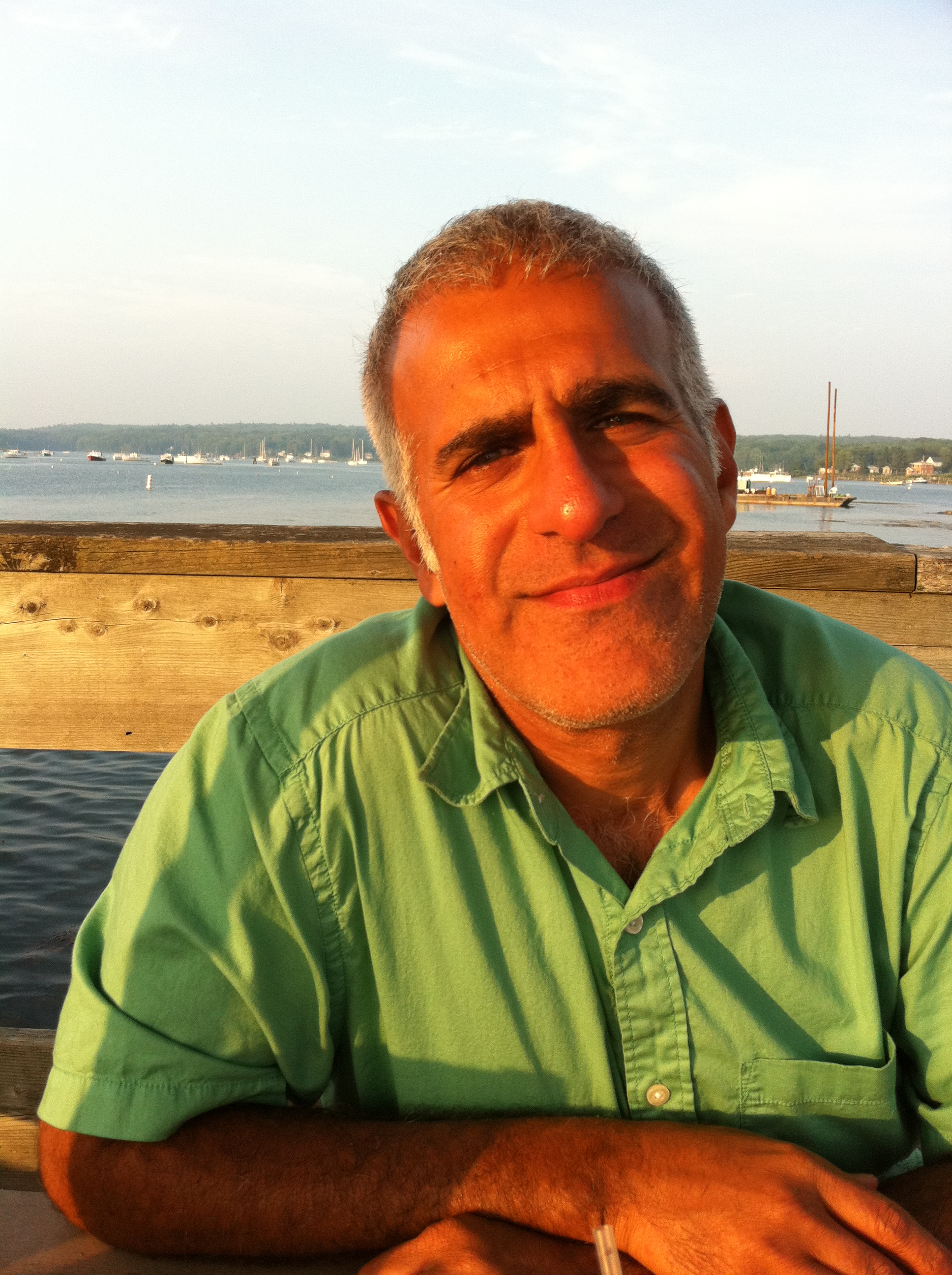
- Jay Blotcher in Maine, July 2011
- Born: 1960 (age 65–66); Boston, Massachusetts
- Education: Syracuse University
- Occupations: Journalist, Editor
- Spouse: Brook Garrett
- Relatives: Arnie Portocarrero (birth father)
- Writing career
- Years active: 1983—
- Subjects: LGBT Culture, Art, and Politics; AIDS

Jay Blotcher (born 1960) is an American activist, journalist, and editor. He was active in the AIDS Coalition to Unleash Power (ACT UP) in its early years, serving as chair of the media committee, and was a founding member of Queer Nation.

Blotcher later worked as a publicist for the American Foundation for AIDS Research (AmFAR) and the Culinary Institute of America, as well as co-founding a public relations firm that specialized in representing progressive groups and individuals. His work has appeared in both mainstream and LGBTQ publications, including The New York Times, the Advocate, Out, POZ, Gay City News, and LGNY.

In 2004, Blotcher and his longtime partner were among the first same-sex couples to be married in the state of New York when New Paltz mayor Jason West wed twenty-five couples in front of the village hall in a ceremony later challenged in court.

== Adoption and early life ==
Blotcher was born to nineteen-year-old Valerie Paul in June 1960, although his birth remained unknown to his biological father, Baltimore Orioles pitcher Arnie Portocarrero. Paul and Portocarrero had met through friends over drinks in Boston one evening, Blotcher says his mother later told him. After his birth, Paul surrendered custody to a foster home in greater Boston, where Blotcher lived until June 30, 1961, when he was adopted by Malvin "Sonny" Blotcher and Elaine "Lolly" Blotcher through a Jewish adoption agency.

Blotcher grew up in Randolph, Massachusetts, with his sister, Andrea, also adopted, and attended Temple Beth Am Hebrew School. Blotcher's parents were active at temple, both serving in leadership roles and volunteering at temple events. Blotcher graduated from Randolph High School (Massachusetts) in 1978.

Blotcher's interest in LGBTQ activism began while he was a student at Syracuse University, where he wrote a pair of articles profiling the school's Gay Student Association in the student newspaper, The Daily Orange, and magazine, Report. During a journalism class in his sophomore year, when required to write a term paper on a major magazine, Blotcher chose the gay publication Christopher Street, spending a day in the magazine's New York City offices, and subsequently sending the publisher a copy of his term paper. Editor Tom Steele wrote back, "When you come to New York, you have a job." Blotcher graduated from Syracuse University in May 1982.

Valerie Paul eventually searched for her son, leading to Blotcher's 1988 reunion with her and discovery of his Puerto Rican roots.

== Living and working in New York City ==
Blotcher moved to New York City after graduating from college in the spring of 1982. As promised, Tom Steele hired Blotcher to write for Christopher Street and The New York Native', two publications covering arts and politics in the New York City lesbian and gay community. Blotcher was living with friends on the Upper West Side.

In 1983, Blotcher worked as an associate producer for Our Time, a thirteen-week television series on metropolitan gay life, produced and hosted by activist, author and film historian Vito Russo. Because the pay was inadequate, Russo suggested Blotcher get a night job at the Saint Marks Baths located on Manhattan's Lower East Side, where Russo had worked while writing his book The Celluloid Closet. Blotcher got a job as a towel boy.

In 1989, Blotcher moved to the Lower East Side, taking a one bedroom apartment on the second floor of an 1889 tenement building on Essex Street where he paid $485 per month in rent. Blotcher recalls that many of his activist comrades also lived in the neighborhood, and several, including his friend, author Michelangelo Signorile, lived upstairs in the same building. On the Lower East Side, members of ACT UP formed "uneasy alliances" with community organizers there by day, and peopled local bars like the Tunnel and Wonder Bar at night.

In 1990, with Alan Klein, Blotcher co-founded Public Impact Media Consultants, a public relations firm specializing in progressive groups and individuals. Blotcher and Klein had met in 1987 at a picket Blotcher helped organize against Cardinal John O'Connor and the policies of the Roman Catholic Church.

== ACT UP and Queer Nation ==
Blotcher was volunteering at the Gay Men's Health Crisis in 1987, working the telephones for donations to its annual AIDS Walk New York, when he first heard about the AIDS Coalition to Unleash Power (ACT UP). A friend came into the office and told him a group of activists was marching on Wall Street the next day to protest the high price of azidothymidine (AZT), one of the only drugs then available to fight HIV. Blotcher said that resonated with him, so he attended the demonstration the next morning. A few months later, when he saw ACT UP at the Second National March on Washington for Lesbian and Gay Rights, "in all its fiery fury, all of its grandeur, all of its sexy anger", he wanted to be a part of it.

Blotcher attended the first meeting of ACT UP's media committee, convened in the living room of Vito Russo's West Twenty-Fourth Street apartment. The committee's challenge was getting journalists to write about AIDS in spite of the apathy of the unaffected and the stigma of the affected. Blotcher would become the fourth person to chair the committee, following David Corkery and Bob Rafsky, who shared the role, and Michelangelo Signorile, who passed the responsibility on to him. Blotcher said the unwillingness of the media to cover such a consequential public health threat as AIDS led to his revelation that "journalism isn't objective."

As the chair of the Media Committee, Blotcher donned a suit and tie for demonstrations, and deliberately presented a calm and clearly spoken professional demeanor to the assembled journalists. He spoke on behalf of ACT UP at numerous demonstrations, including the second anniversary "spring lie-down" at New York City Hall in July 1989, and Stop the Church on December 10, 1989, among others. Blotcher represented the group at the International AIDS Conferences in Montreal (1989), Amsterdam (1992), and Yokohama (1994).

Blotcher also participated in other demonstrations, including the protests of the Food and Drug Administration (FDA) in 1988, and the National Institutes of Health (NIH) in 1990. In 1989, to protest the obstacles unwed partners of people with AIDS faced gaining entrance to emergency rooms and intensive care units, he and other members of ACT UP went to New York City Hall in couples to demand marriage licenses. On one occasion a photo of Blotcher being arrested appeared in USA Today, and his mother, although displeased, clipped out the photograph and mounted it on the refrigerator.

== Living upstate and fighting for marriage rights ==
In 2001, Blotcher left Manhattan, and moved to High Falls, New York with Brook Garrett, then his domestic partner. The couple had also entered into a civil union in Vermont in 2000. In High Falls, Blotcher expected to "hang up his activist boots."

In 2004, years before the state of New York legalized same-sex marriage, Blotcher and Garrett were among twenty-five same-sex couples wed in New Paltz, New York by mayor Jason West. Blotcher said that, while West could not issue them a legal marriage license, the ceremony was still important to "show people who we are."

Blotcher and Garrett traveled to California in 2008, where they were among the 18,000 same-sex couples who were legally wed before the passage of Proposition 8 banned same-sex marriages, and the state grandfathered them in. That same year, Blotcher was one of the organizers of Join the Impact, a global online effort to organize for LGBTQ marriage equality, and attended the group's Lake Worth, Florida demonstration to protest Florida's Amendment 2, a measure that would have constitutionally defined marriage as a union between one man and one woman.

The day after the New York state legislature voted to make same-sex marriage legal in 2011, Blotcher said, "I'm dancing in the streets about what happened last night, but I'm very mindful of what work has not yet been done." Blotcher was referring to the Defense of Marriage Act (DOMA), and other remaining legal federal obstacles.

Blotcher is the co-founder of the Hudson Valley LGBTQ Center, and volunteers for the New Paltz LGBTQ Pride March and Festival.

== Journalism and book editing ==
After moving upstate, Blotcher turned to journalism full-time, and found work as a stringer for The New York Times, writing four stories, and contributing to three others between 2001 and 2003. During a 2004 review of the newspaper's part-time staffers, Blotcher's past work as a spokesperson for ACT UP and AMFAR came to the attention of editor Susan Edgerley, who Blotcher said "blindsided" him when she dismissed him in February 2004, "...to protect against any appearance of conflict of interest." After the dismissal was reported by The Washington Post, activists Larry Kramer and Michael Petrelis criticized the decision, citing the apparent conflicts of interest of other Times' reporters.

Blotcher was the editor of Rainbow flag creator Gilbert Baker's posthumous memoir Rainbow Warrior: My Life in Color. Blotcher said the work was the fulfillment of a promise he had made to Baker in 1997.

Blotcher also edited Queer in America: Sex, the Media, and the Closets of Power by Michelangelo Signorile, Animal Factory by David Kirby, and Impresario of Castro Street: An Intimate Showbiz Memoir by Marc Huestis, among others.

As of June 2025, Blotcher had edited more than 100 literary projects, including memoirs, fiction, nonfiction, history, and plays.
