= Let the Record Show =

Let the Record Show may refer to:

- Let the Record Show: Dexys Do Irish and Country Soul, a 2016 album by Dexys (formerly Dexy's Midnight Runners)
- Let the Record Show: A Political History of ACT UP New York, 1987–1993, a 2021 non-fiction book by Sarah Schulman
