= The Cosmopolitans (novel) =

- Cover of the 2016 Feminist Press edition
- Author: Sarah Schulman
- Publisher: Feminist Press
- Publication date: 2016

The Cosmopolitans is a 2016 novel by Sarah Schulman, first published by Feminist Press.

== Plot ==
The novel is set in Greenwich Village in 1958 and focuses on the friendship between Earl, a gay African-American actor, and Bette, a heterosexual white secretary. Bette was ostracized by her Midwestern family decades prior, and is upset by the sudden appearance of her cousin Hortense. Hortense bonds with Earl, who struggles with loneliness and daily discrimination. The friendship between Bette and Earl is tested by betrayal.

== Writing ==
The novel was published in 2016 by The Feminist Press, and is Schulman's 17th book. It was the first book published as part of The Feminist Press and VIDA's "corrective canon" of works that address gender disparities.

== Themes ==
The novel was inspired by Honoré de Balzac's 1846 novel Cousin Bette, and uses elements of its plot to explore the social setting of 1950s urban America. Critics also noted that it paid homage to the work of James Baldwin and Carson McCullers.

The novel deals with several themes found across Schulman's work, including homophobia and the impact of familial rejection on LGBT people, and cycles of abuse. Lambda Literary Review noted that the characters experienced illusions, delusions and misdirections which relate to and symbolize the birth of consumer advertising in that period.

Hugh Ryan wrote that it "has deep roots in Schulman's nonfiction, which I would broadly classify as an attempt to explore, catalog, and explain the queer experience in America today through the specific lens of her own life." Ryan particularly compared the novel's emphasis on the importance of urbanity to her discourse in The Gentrification of the Mind: Witness to a Lost Imagination (2012), and its portrayal of familial trauma to Ties that Bind: Familial Homophobia and Its Consequences (2009). He observed that "In Bette, Schulman has crafted a central character who, though straight, has gone through a similar process of abandonment and self-interrogation" as an LGBT character.

== Reception ==
The novel received positive review from critics. Matilda Bernstein Sycamore of SFGate wrote that it "shimmers where it departs from the conventions of realism to indict not just structural homophobia, racism and misogyny but also the structures of writing that further these societal ills. Schulman accomplishes all this with deadpan humor and startling precision."

PW wrote that "Simultaneously a realist exploration of a particular milieu, an illustration of the changing roles and possibilities for women at that time, and a series of thoughtful musings on the nature of companionship and platonic love, Earl and Bette's story is also a satisfying revenge narrative and a portrait of an unexpected but vital friendship."

The Lambda Literary Review called it "a finely tuned, clever, and remarkably contemporary historical novel." Jan Stewart of the New York Times found its portrayal of New York City to be somewhat nostalgic, describing it as "a book of sighs, for dreams thwarted and for a city that has long since moved on."
