= Girls, Visions and Everything =

1986 novel by Sarah Schulman

- Cover of the 1999 Seal Press edition
- Author: Sarah Schulman
- Publisher: Seal Press
- Publication date: 1986

Girls,Visions and Everything is the second novel by Sarah Schulman. It was published in 1986 by Seal Press.

== Plot ==
The novel follows Lila Futuransky, a Jewish lesbian in New York City who has chosen to imitate the lifestyle of Jack Kerouac, inspired by his novel On the Road.

== Writing ==
The novel was inspired by Schulman's experience of hearing readings of Beat writing at the 8th Street Bookshop when she was a child. The title is inspired by a line from Kerouac's novel, On the Road, which reads: "Somewhere along the line I knew there'd be girls, visions, everything".

While Schulman's first novel The Sophie Horowitz Story and her third novel After Delores are crime thrillers, Girls,Visions and Everything is a literary novel. However, its urban setting and the characterization of Lila do draw from crime fiction tropes. The novel is also a homage to the writing of Jack Kerouac. Feminist scholar Kim Emery wrote that in the novel "lesbian-feminism meets Jack Kerouac in a pragmatic critique of "American" arrogance". Schulman uses the urban landscape of New York City to illustrate relationships between characters and make social commentary.

Schulman wrote the novel while waitressing at a cafe and decided to get an MFA afterwards.

== Reception ==
Publishers Weekly gave the novel a mixed review, writing that "Unfortunately Schulman tries to imitate Kerouac's writing style rather than develop her own voice."
