= Maggie Terry =

- Author: Sarah Schulman
- Genre: Lesbian crime fiction
- Publisher: The Feminist Press
- Publication date: 2018

Maggie Terry is a 2018 lesbian crime novel by Sarah Schulman. It was published by The Feminist Press.

== Plot ==
Maggie Terry, a recovering drug addict and former NYPD officer, attempts to start a new career as a private detective. She has become estranged from her partner and daughter, and hopes to make amends for her wrongdoing in the past.

== Writing and themes ==
Liz von Klemperer of Lambda Literary Review considered the novel to be a deconstruction of the lesbian crime fiction genre that Schulman's earlier novels helped to define. She noted that early lesbian detective stories, including Schulman's work, featured characters who were outsiders in society and faced stigma over their sexuality. Maggie Terry subverts that character archetype, she is as a lesbian character who is privileged because of her status as a white, upper-class woman. She is also a perpetrator of abuses of police power, rather than a victim of inequality. Instead of overcoming a society that oppresses her like earlier lesbian detective protagonists, Maggie Terry must overcome her own addictions and become accountable for her past.

Von Klemperer suggested that while Schulman's debut novel the Sophie Horowitz Story (1984) was written during the AIDS crisis and Reagan administration, Maggie Terry was more strongly influenced by the Trump administration and Black Lives Matter movement.

The novel is set immediately after the election of Donald Trump, and deals with the disintegration of communal ties and political norms in the United States. While the protagonist, Maggie Terry, is not politically engaged, the setting and characters frequently reference the Trump administration and its impact on the LGBT community.

== Reception ==
PW praised the book's "vivid depiction of Maggie’s addiction, punctuated by the gritty New York City setting", noting that it is "less a whodunit and more an exploration of drug and alcohol addiction." Kirkus wrote that "Schulman offers, with mixed success, a sprawling exploration of New York nostalgia, police brutality, addiction memoir, and queer love, with a mystery as the cherry on top."

Lisa Fernandes of All About Romance praised the novel's compelling story, but felt that it contained too many tropes and had flawed prose.

Baxter Clare Trautman of New York Journal of Books wrote that the murder mystery elements of the novel were underdeveloped, but that "for readers interested in the deeper mysteries of human relationships, Maggie Terry delivers, with Schulman addressing the more trenchant mystery of how people and communities rebuild themselves after ruin."
