= Petrelis =

Petrelis (Greek: Πετρέλης) is a Greek surname. Notable people with the surname include:

- Michael Petrelis (born 1959), American activist and blogger
- Thanos Petrelis (born 1975), Greek singer
