= Empathy (novel) =

Empathy is a 1992 allegorical novel by Sarah Schulman.

== Plot ==
Anna O., a Jewish lesbian living in New York City, struggles with feelings of isolation and low-self worth after being alienated by homophobic relatives and having her heart broken by a mysterious woman in white. She befriends an impoverished psychologist known as "Doc" and they begin a journey of self discovery together.

== Themes ==
The premise of the novel is a deconstruction of Freudian psychoanalysis. The novel deals with themes of Jewish otherness and assimilation, and the concept of queer diasporas in heteronormative societies.

== Reception ==
PW called it "a plain-spoken, often funny narrative, [where] Schulman makes provocative statements about gender roles, sexual orientation, AIDS, homelessness, drugs and the therapeutic value of an attentive ear." Kirkus wrote that "the hyper-observant, gritty-honest voice that characterizes all of Schulman's lesbian protagonists (People in Trouble, 1989; After Delores, 1988) is now cooler, steadier, and more refined."
