= People in Trouble =

1989 novel by Sarah Schulman

People In Trouble
- Author: Sarah Schulman
- Publisher: E. P. Dutton
- Publication date: January 31, 1989
- Pages: 228

People In Trouble is a 1989 novel by Sarah Schulman. Set in New York City during the AIDS crisis, the novel focuses on the intersecting lives of several lesbian, gay and bisexual people.

The novel had a positive critical reception and plans were made to adapt it into an opera or film. However, Schulman struggled to find producers willing to greenlight a project that dealt with AIDS related topics or lesbian characters. Schulman has since accused Jonathan Larson of plagiarizing the novel for his 1996 musical Rent.

== Plot ==
The novel includes several intersecting storylines. In one, a woman named Molly falls in love with Kate, a married painter. Kate is unwilling to leave her husband Peter, and instead hopes to maintain a relationship with both him and Molly. Molly begins working with an AIDS activist group called Justice to stop Ronald Horne, a real estate developer and conservative politician who intends to evict tenants with AIDS and further marginalize them.

== Writing and background ==
The novel was based on Schulman's experience of having a romantic relationship with a married woman who held homophobic sentiments. Schulman said that she wrote the book about a "fantasy" in which the married woman would become less homophobic and more socially aware after seeing the impact of the AIDS crisis. Many other aspects of the novel are based on Schulman's life. The fictional activist group Justice bears many similarities to the AIDS advocacy group ACT UP, of which Schulman was a member. In a 2019 column, Schulman noted that she had completed the manuscript for People In Trouble a few years before ACT UP was founded. She stated that parallels between a small protest at St. Patrick's Cathedral in the novel and the Stop the Church protest organized by ACT UP on December 10, 1989, were coincidental.

The novel's antagonist Ronald Horne is based on real estate developer and politician Donald Trump, and Schulman recalled visiting Trump Tower while writing the novel and being disgusted. The novel deals with themes of gentrification, which she later addressed in the non-fiction book The Gentrification of the Mind: Witness to a Lost Imagination (2012). Horne's actions in the novel serve to illustrate the interaction between gentrification, homelessness, and the AIDS epidemic.

== Reception ==
The novel was published on January 31, 1989, by E. P. Dutton. Barbara Austin, in a review for the San Francisco Chronicle, wrote that "Schulman's treatment of AIDS as the backdrop to her characters' story brings new depth and insight to this enormously complicated issue. Her sense of living inside this epidemic is offered sparely and astutely."

Publishers Weekly gave the novel a positive review for its "witty, angry, and anguished" story. Kirkus Reviews wrote that "Half raw sensuality and street scenes, half political manifesto, this passionate, raggedy tale will cheer Shulman's considerable readership."

== Adaptations ==
While writing the novel, Schulman worked with Stewart Wallace and Michael Korie to adapt it into an opera. The opera's director cancelled the project after deciding that its content was objectionable. Schulman and Wallace sent copies of the manuscript and novel to other opera houses in the hopes of having it adapted. They pitched the opera as "a West Side Story for the '90s" and "a modern La bohème". They were rejected by every opera house and had abandoned the opera by 1992. Wallace and Korie later wrote Harvey Milk together.

Schulman also discussed plans to develop it into a film, but was unable to find investors who were interested in a story about AIDS from the perspective of lesbian characters.

== Plagiarism accusations ==
Schulman has accused Jonathan Larson of stealing characters, scenes and ideas from her novel and using them in his 1996 musical Rent. She gave the musical a negative review at the time of its premiere, criticizing it for marginalizing queer perspectives and focusing on heterosexual points of view. Sarah Swedberg wrote a retrospective review in Nursing Clio where she argued that People in Trouble presented a more historically accurate but less "feel good" portrayal of AIDS activism in New York than Rent. Swedberg noted that People In Trouble centered the marginalization of queer people, while Rent softened and sanitized it.
