= Killing of Eddie Werner =

1997 murder case in New Jersey, US

- Location: 40.090928°N 74.361269°W; Jackson Township, New Jersey
- Date: September 27, 1997
- Attack type: Murder
- Victim: Eddie Werner
- Perpetrator: Sam Manzie

On September 27, 1997, 15-year-old Sam Manzie raped and killed 11-year-old Eddie Werner after the two met by chance in Jackson Township, New Jersey.

== Background ==
In August 1996, Sam Manzie began a relationship with 43-year-old gay man Stephen Simmons, after having met him on the internet. They first met in person at the Freehold Raceway Mall, with Manzie being driven there by his father. There, Simmons stated, they ate together and mutually fondled while watching Phenomenon in the theater. Simmons met Manzie three more times afterwards. According to Simmons, Manzie said that he had fantasized about raping a younger boy, to which he replied "Sam, you gotta get help." He also stated that "Ever since [Manzie] was 12 and a half, he wanted to go to bed with an older man. Well, I was the older man. I was the fantasy."

In August of the following year, New Jersey prosecutors began secretly talking to Simmons through Manzie, in taped conversations, in order to build a criminal case against him. Manzie ultimately destroyed the tapes and said he would no longer participate in the investigation. He said that he had been bullied by the investigators, taken out of a psychiatric clinic against his will and threatened with the prospect of being arrested. On September 24, three days before the murder, his parents attempted to commit him to a psychiatric facility due to his violent outbursts.

== Incident ==
On September 27, 1997, 11-year-old Eddie Werner left his house in order to raise funds for a school project. He arrived at Manzie's home in the morning, while Manzie's parents were out. According to prosecutors, the encounter was by chance and Manzie did not know Werner. There, investigators said, Manzie raped and strangled Werner to death, and later hid his body in a suitcase.

== Prosecution ==
Manzie was arrested and charged with rape, murder and robbery. Simmons was charged with third-degree sodomy arising from his relationship with Manzie.

During Simmons' trial in 1999, Manzie refused to testify against him despite his parents' wishes and the presiding judge's order, which resulted in him being sentenced to six months in prison for contempt of court. He also exchanged a number of letters with Simmons during detention. He offered to testify in Simmons' trial that he had agreed to his sexual experiences with him, but Simmons' lawyer refused. Manzie said, during Simmons' sentencing, that the man had been a "good role model" for him. He said that their relationship "was a good one. Some say it must have been a manipulative relationship, but how can they say so if they weren't there?" As a result of his refusal to testify, a count of sexual assault against Simmons was dropped and he was sentenced to five years in prison.

Manzie apologized in court, he said, "for all of the suffering I've put so many people through... I still can't figure out why I did what I did." He pleaded guilty and was sentenced to 70 years in jail. The judge ruled that he would have to serve 59 years of his sentence before being eligible for parole under the No Early Release Act, but an appeals court decided that the law did not apply to him, thus making him eligible for parole in 2027, at the age of 45. An equally divided New Jersey Supreme Court was unable to reach a decision about the matter.

== Aftermath ==
The murder was blamed on the internet by a number of press outlets, with Newsweek publishing "Did the Net Kill Eddie" and the New York Post calling Manzie a "Cyber Psycho". The press also criticized Werner's PTA for, it was alleged, putting children at risk. A state bill sponsored by John A. Rocco was introduced in the New Jersey General Assembly that would limit door-to-door knocking by children in school programs. Another similar bill was also considered in Pennsylvania.

The case inspired the 2007 novel The Child by Sarah Schulman. It was also the topic of Brian Karem's Innocent Victims (2001).
