= The Ties That Bind =

The Ties That Bind (an idiom expressing the strength of familial and social connections), and variants of it, may refer to:

== Film ==
- The Tie That Binds (1923 film), a lost American silent drama
- The Ties That Bind, a 1985 documentary by Su Friedrich
- The Tie That Binds (1995 film), a thriller starring Daryl Hannah
- Ties That Bind, a 2006 TV movie starring Nicole de Boer
- Ties That Bind, a 2010 TV movie starring Kristanna Loken
- Ties That Bind (film), a 2011 drama
- The Ties That Bind Us, a 2024 French-Belgian drama

== Gaming ==
- Street Fighter IV: The Ties That Bind, an animated movie tie-in of the video game Street Fighter IV
- The Suffering: Ties That Bind, a 2005 video game
- "Ties That Bind", a 2-part episode of The Walking Dead: A New Frontier

== Literature ==
- The Ties That Bind, a 1993 BDSM novel by Vanessa Duriès
- The Ties That Bind, a novel in the Star Wars: Jedi Apprentice series
- Ties That Bind, a 1993 book by Guy Baldwin
- The Tie That Binds (novel), by Kent Haruf, 1984
- Ties That Bind: Familial Homophobia and Its Consequences, by Sarah Schulman, 2009

== Music ==
- "Blest Be the Tie That Binds", a 1782 hymn by John Fawcett (and used repetitively in the 1938 play Our Town by Thornton Wilder, which helped popularized the hymn)
- Ties That Bind, a scrapped album by Bruce Springsteen that led to The River, 1980
  - "The Ties That Bind" (Bruce Springsteen song), 1980
  - The Ties That Bind: The River Collection, a 2015 box set
- "The Ties That Bind" (Don Williams song), 1974
- "Ties That Bind", a song by Alter Bridge from the 2007 album Blackbird
- "Ties That Bind", a song by August Burns Red from the 2020 album Guardians
- "Ties That Bind", a song by Disarmonia Mundi from the 2009 album The Isolation Game
- "Ties That Bind", a song by Trenches from the 2022 album Reckoner
- "The Ties That Bind", a song by Kamelot from the 2015 album Haven Japanese edition
- "Tie That Binds", a song by Drake from the 2022 album Honestly, Nevermind

== Television ==
- Ties That Bind (TV series), a 2015 Canadian-American drama series
- The Ties That Bind, English-language title of the BBC Alba programme Bannan (TV series), 2014–2022.
- "The Ties That Bind", an episode of Andromeda, 2000
- "The Ties That Bind", an episode of Arrow season 6, 2018
- "The Ties That Bind" (Battlestar Galactica), 2008
- "The Ties That Bind" (Jeeves and Wooster), 1993
- "The Ties That Bind", an episode of The O.C. season 1, 2004
- "The Ties That Bind", an episode of Justice League Unlimited, 2005
- "Ties That Bind", an episode of The Loud House, 2016
- "Ties That Bind", an episode of She-Ra and the Princess of Power, 2019
- "The Ties That Bind", an episode of Stargate SG-1 season 9, 2005
- "Ties That Bind", an episode of Xena: Warrior Princess season 1, 1996
- "The Ties That Bind" (The Vampire Diaries), 2012
- "Ties That Bind", an episode of Revolution, 2012
- "The Ties That Bind" (Wing and a Prayer), a 1997 episode
- "Ties That Bind Us", an episode of Hustle
- "The Ties That Bind", in Naruto volume 64, 2013
- "The Ties that Bind", an episode Kavanagh QC, 1997
- Ties That Bind, an episode of Beyond, 2017

== See also ==
- The Tides That Bind (disambiguation)
