= Amateur City =

1984 novel by Katherine V. Forrest

- First edition cover
- Author: Katherine V. Forrest
- Genre: Lesbian crime novel
- Publisher: Naiad Press
- Publication date: 1984

Amateur City is a 1984 lesbian crime novel by Katherine V. Forrest, published by Naiad Press. It was the first entry in a series of novels about fictional detective Kate Delafield.

== Plot ==
Kate Delafield, a closeted lesbian detective, investigates the murder of an executive whose abusive tendences earned him many enemies.

== Writing ==
Forrest originally planned to write a mystery about an amateur detective named Ellen O'Neill. She replaced this character with LAPD homicide detective Kate Delafield after considering the need to include police within the narrative and "the fact that women had finally won the court cases that allowed us to move from restricted work in jails and with juveniles into the higher echelons of police work." Delafield is considered to be the first lesbian police detective in fiction. Forrest gave Delafield a backstory of serving in the Marines in the Vietnam War, and made the character conscious of external pressures that caused changes within LAPD that allowed women to advance as detectives.

Like in many of Forrest's novels, the victim of the inciting crime is an unsympathetic and abusive figure.

== Reception ==
Maria Cipriani described the novel as "an entertaining and realistic portrayal of lesbian life". The novel had a large impact on lesbian fiction published afterwards.
