= Lesbian crime fiction =

Lesbian crime fiction is a subgenre of crime fiction that centers lesbian characters and themes.

== History ==
Lesbian crime fiction became increasingly prominent in the United States the 1980s. The genre was influenced by detective fiction, lesbian fiction, and feminist literature. In 1984, Katherine V. Forrest's Amateur City, Sarah Schulman's The Sophie Horowitz Story, and Barbara Wilson's Murder in the Collective were published. Naiad Press published many of the most successful lesbian detective stories in this era, including Forrest's Kate Delafield novels, and works by Nikki Baker, Lauren Wright Douglas, Vicki P. McConnell, and Claire McNab. In Spain, lesbian crime fiction emerged in the 1990s with stories like La soledad del monstruo (1992) and Plumas de doble filo (1999).

== Analysis ==
Lesbian crime fiction generally follows the basic conventions of crime fiction, involving a crime, an impetus to solve it, and red herrings to mislead the detective and reader. In addition to these elements, it also portrays aspects of the lesbian experience. Lesbian crime stories tend to subvert the tropes of crime fiction. JoAnn Pavletich identified "a sense of genre parody, the recognition of a sexist society, an acknowledgment of a friendly community, and contempt for the white-collar business world" as major elements of the lesbian crime novel.

In many lesbian crime novels, the protagonist's search for the criminal is paralleled by her investigation of her own sexuality and nature. Many novels include aspects of both romance and crime fiction.
