= Shimmer (Schulman novel) =

- Author: Sarah Schulman
- Publisher: Avon Books/HarperCollins
- Publication date: 1998

Shimmer is a 1998 novel by Sarah Schulman. It was published by Avon Books/HarperCollins.

== Plot ==
The novel follows a group of writers in New York City in 1948 whose lives are affected by the Red Scare.

== Reception ==
Erica Sanders of The New York Times gave it a positive review, writing that "At times, its attempts to illuminate today's politics through those of an earlier era can be tenuous. Ultimately, however, this flaw is redeemed by Schulman's talent, by her lushly drawn characters and the seamlessly rendered world they inhabit." PW wrote that it was "More than a study of interlinked lives, the novel is a diligent, atmospherically detailed slice of social and cultural history."

Kirkus gave it a negative review, calling it "Agitprop, pure and simple: The physical details of the period are nicely evoked, but the story itself is more a crude rant than a perceptive reprise of an era."
