= Stagestruck: Theater, AIDS, and the Marketing of Gay America =

1998 non-fiction book by Sarah Schulman

- Author: Sarah Schulman
- Genre: Non-fiction
- Published: September 24, 1998

Stagestruck: Theater, Aids, and the Marketing of Gay America is a non-fiction book by lesbian writer Sarah Schulman. The book examines the similarities between her novel People in Trouble and Jonathan Larson's award-winning musical Rent.

== Content ==
Schulman takes the reader on a behind-the-scenes tour of New York's theatre culture providing a glimpse into the power structure that makes up the theatre and media scene as she depicts her fight for compensation from the estate of Jonathan Larson, whose award-winning musical Rent shares many characters and situations with her novel People in Trouble, a novel she published in 1991 and that Larson had read and been familiar with prior to writing Rent.

Through her journey and her struggle for justice she discovers that she is not alone. Schulman learns that there many mainstream artists who "borrow" material from lesser-known artists and go on to be successful and win awards, but who fail to provide even the smallest mention of the origin of their work. She also learns that there are many neglected works and performances that provide a more accurate depiction of LGBT lifestyle than mainstream artists.

== Publication ==
Stagestruck was published on September 24, 1998, by Duke University Press.

== Award and nominations ==
Stagestruck won and was nominated for multiple awards including the 1999 Stonewall Non-Fiction Book Award, the 1999 Israel Fishman Non-Fiction Award and was nominated for the 1998 Lambda Literary Award for Lesbian Studies and 1998 Lambda Literary Award for Drama.

== Reception ==
In a neutral review for CNN, reviewer Ted Gideonse writes that the book is a "damning analysis of the popular cultural depictions of AIDS and homosexuality". Writing for The New York Times, Jesse Green indicates that the book "tends toward overstatement", with "blistering critique" of the musical Rent that allegendly plagiarised Schulman's 1990 novel People in Trouble.
