= The Child (novel) =

2007 book

- Author: Sarah Schulman
- Language: English
- Genre: Drama
- Publisher: Carroll & Graf Publishers
- Publication date: 2007
- Publication place: Canada
- Pages: 288
- ISBN: 9781551522432

The Child is a crime novel by Sarah Schulman. Originally written in 1999, it was published by Carroll & Graff in 2007.

The novel is partially based on the real 1997 crime of 15-year-old child murderer Sam Manzie. It tells the story of Stew, a teenage boy whose prosecution for engaging in prostitution leads him into a mental breakdown. The book, Schulman's eleventh, explores topics related to homophobia, societal attitudes and child sexuality. Similar to the real life case, Stew is considered by the law of his country to be too young to engage in sexual acts with adults, but not too young to be prosecuted under the law as an adult.

The book was featured in the shortlist of Lambda Literary Award for Lesbian Fiction 2007 and as a finalist of the Ferro Grumley Award for LGBTQ Fiction 2008.
