= The Mere Future =

2009 novel by Sarah Schulman

- Author: Sarah Schulman
- Genre: Satirical science fiction
- Publisher: Arsenal Pulp Press
- Publication date: 2009

The Mere Future is a 2009 satirical science fiction novel by Sarah Schulman. It was published by Arsenal Pulp Press.

== Plot ==
The story is in a speculative future New York City where the fictional Retrocrat party has instituted sweeping changes like the ban of all franchise corporations, the elimination of homeslessness, and the secession of Staten Island.

== Themes ==
David Brauner wrote that the book employs ideas of historical authenticity and mythmaking to reimagine Jewish history. He considered the novel to contrast cultural and historical continuity with "the amoral, abstracted mystery with which future states try to seduce, distract, and control their citizens."

== Publication ==
In 2000, Schulman published a short story with the same premise and title in the Harrington Lesbian Fiction Quarterly.

== Reception ==
June Thomas praised the book in the Lambda Literary Review, writing that it "is probably Schulman’s funniest book, at least in the early pages that are full of hope and audacious optimism." It received similarly positive reviews in Rain Taxi where it was described as "a funny, open hearted satire", and in Diva where it was called "a funny and inventive read". Sheryl LeSage of Liberty Press wrote that "It’s hard to describe it, other than to say Schulman’s humor is painfully sharp, her sarcasm sharper, and her intellect sharpest of all."

Robert Teixeira in Canadian Woman Studies wrote that "This is a novel of biting satire and sharp humour which presents us with the dreadfully recognizable scenario of how lives are lived under the reign of a corporate behemoth that has reached deep into the consciousness and desires of its characters' lives, revealing an highly ambivalent state of "corporate citizens" in this mere future of New York City."

Publishers Weekly gave the book a mixed review, writing that it was full of "puns and breathless quirkiness, and while she's got some good ideas, the insistent zaniness of her prose is aggravating at best." Danika Ellis of The Lesbrary gave it a similarly mixed review, finding the characters to be unlikable and the plot underdeveloped.

Rob Weinert-Kendt, in American Theatre, wrote that "The book speaks, haltingly but unmistakably, to the queasiness of a national moment that feels poised between transformative change and deadening sameness. Maybe Schulman's impulse to anatomize our current culture explains why the near-future she has sketched in The Mere Future is less than convincing."
