= Jim Hubbard (filmmaker) =

American AIDS filmmaker

- Website: jimhubbardfilms.com

Jim Hubbard is an American documentary filmmaker and AIDS historian. He is best known for directing and producing the 2012 film United in Anger: A History of ACT UP, and creating the ACT UP Oral History Project alongside Sarah Schulman.

== Personal life ==
Early in his career, Hubbard was in a romantic relationship with another filmmaker, Roger Jacoby, who passed away in the 1980s.

== Film career ==
Hubbard released the documentary United in Anger: A History of ACT UP at the Museum of Modern Art in February 2012.

== ACT UP Oral History Project ==
Hubbard and Schulman created the ACT UP Oral History Project in June 2001. The project is a public domain archive of audio and video interviews with 187 members of the AIDS activist group ACT UP. As of 2026, the archive website had more than 14 million views and 700,000 content downloads.
