= Gaudi Afternoon =

2001 film by Susan Seidelman

- Directed by: Susan Seidelman
- Written by: James Myhre
- Based on: Gaudi Afternoon by Barbara Wilson
- Produced by: Andrés Vicente Gómez
- Starring: Judy Davis; Marcia Gay Harden; Lili Taylor; Juliette Lewis; Christopher Bowen; Courtney Jines
- Cinematography: Josep M. Civit
- Edited by: Deirdre Slevin
- Music by: Bernardo Bonezzi
- Production company: Lolafilms
- Distributed by: Filmauro; First Look International
- Release date: May 2001
- Running time: 97 minutes
- Countries: United States; Spain
- Language: English

Gaudi Afternoon is a 2001 American-Spanish comedy film starring Judy Davis, Marcia Gay Harden, Lili Taylor, Juliette Lewis, Christopher Bowen and Courtney Jines. The film is based on Barbara Wilson's detective novel and directed by Susan Seidelman.

== Plot ==
Cassandra, an expatriate American book translator (Judy Davis) living in Barcelona, Catalonia, Spain, who is hired by a mysterious woman, Frankie (Marcia Gay Harden), to locate her missing husband so he can sign some important papers. Nothing Frankie says is true: the husband turns out to be a woman, the issue isn't legal papers but a child's custody, and even Frankie's most obvious identity, in red cape and red pumps, is a false front. But Cassandra keeps at it, at first to earn her promised fee, and then to help Frankie, then Frankie's ex, then the child. Along the way, this solitary and somewhat disconnected and bewildered writer frees herself to finish a novel and re-establish a broken relationship with her own past.

Barbara Wilson's novel is the winner of a British Crime Writers' Award for Best Mystery Based in Europe and a Lambda Literary Award. The story is a high-spirited comic adventure that works issues of sexual politics into a madcap plot. The city of Barcelona is a lively party to the film and book's action.

== Release ==
Gaudi Afternoon was the opening night screening at the 25th San Francisco International Gay and Lesbian Film Festival. It was selected as the closing night film for the New York LGBT Film Festival, the Western and Southern Australian Gay and Lesbian Film Festival, the Miami International Gay and Lesbian Film Festival and the Sydney Women of the World International Film Festival. It also played at Outfest, Seattle International Film Festival and the Mar del Plata International Film Festival, among many other venues.

In 2002, the film had a theatrical release in Europe, South Africa, Australia and Japan. After a short run in New York City, it played on TV and DVD in the US.
