= The Tides That Bind =

The Tides That Bind may refer to:

- The Tides That Bind / A Message in a Bottle Story, a 2019 documentary short film about a message in a bottle finder
- "The Tides That Bind", the August 26, 2011 episode of the television series Haven

== See also ==
- The Ties That Bind (disambiguation)
