= My American History =

1994 collection of journalism by Sarah Schulman

My American History: Lesbian and Gay Life During The Reagan/Bush Years
- Author: Sarah Schulman
- Published: 1994
- Publisher: Routledge
- OCLC: 30027225

My American History: Lesbian and Gay Life During The Reagan/Bush Years is a 1994 collection of journalism by Sarah Schulman. The book includes a reprint of Lesbian Avenger Handbook, a 24-page guide for activists.
