= Murder in the Collective =

1984 novel by Barbara Wilson

- Author: Barbara Wilson
- Genre: Lesbian crime fiction
- Publisher: Seal Press
- Publication date: 1984

Murder in the Collective is a 1984 lesbian crime fiction novel by Barbara Wilson. It is the first in a series of novels featuring Pam Nilsen, a fictional lesbian detective. Murder in the Collective is the first American mystery series to feature a lesbian amateur detective, and is considered a foundational work in the lesbian crime fiction genre.
