= United in Anger: A History of ACT UP =

- Directed by: Jim Hubbard
- Written by: Ali Cotterill, Jim Hubbard
- Produced by: Jim Hubbard, Sarah Schulman
- Cinematography: James Wentzy
- Edited by: Ali Cotterill
- Release date: June 6, 2012
- Running time: 90 minutes
- Country: United States
- Language: English

United in Anger: A History of ACT UP is a 2012 documentary film directed by Jim Hubbard and produced by Hubbard and Sarah Schulman about the beginning and progress of the AIDS activist movement from the perspective of the people fighting the epidemic. Archival footage with oral histories of members of ACT UP depicts the history of civil disobedience against corporate greed, social indifference, and government negligence in the face of AIDS. The film captures the efforts of ACT UP to remove the stigma associated with AIDS, push the prioritization of experimental drug research and testing, and provide a context for the devastating effects of the epidemic. The film includes several actions by ACT UP: Seize Control of the FDA, Stop the Church, and Day of Desperation.

== Synopsis ==
HIV arrives in the United States. People, mostly gay men, start dying. The US government ignores it. The Church condemns homosexuals. The pharmaceutical industry produces expensive drugs. People keep dying. Love, grief and outrage lead to the formation of ACT UP in March 1987. United in Anger: A History of ACT UP documents ACT UP's use of direct activism, civil disobedience, inroads and outroads to raise awareness and affect change on a national level.

== Cast ==
- David Barr - himself
- Ken Bing - himself
- Gregg Bordowitz - himself
- Jim Eigo - himself (AIDS activist)
- Avram Finkelstein - himself
- Tom Kalin - himself
- Larry Kramer - himself (archive footage)
- Patrick Moore - himself
- Michael Nesline - himself (Gran Fury founder)
- Ann Northrop - herself, (from ACT UP - New York)
- Michael Petrelis - himself
- Vito Russo - himself, Writer (archive footage)
- Michelangelo Signorile - himself
- Peter Staley - himself

== See also ==
- How to Survive a Plague, another documentary on the history of ACT UP
