= Rat Bohemia =

1995 novel by Sarah Schulman

- Author: Sarah Schulman
- Publisher: E. P. Dutton
- Publication date: October 23, 1995
- ISBN: 0-525-93790-0

Rat Bohemia is a 1995 novel by Sarah Schulman. The novel follows a group of friends, all of whom are lesbians and gay men, in New York City during the AIDS crisis.

== Plot ==
The novel focuses on three white New Yorkers in their mid-thirties: Rita Mae Weems and Killer, both lesbians, and David, a gay man who is dying from AIDS. Rita is estranged from her father, who kicked her out when she was 16 after she had an affair with a classmate. She now works as a rat exterminator, even as she fears rats due to her traumatic experiences with homelessness.

The first section of the book is told from the point of view of Rita, who views the rats as a metaphor for the conditions that people live under. Rita, who is Jewish, grapples with the religious ramifications of her life. The second section follows David, who is rejected by his family because of his homosexuality. As David's death nears, he realizes that his family is likely relieved that he is dying and reflects on the contempt that heterosexual parents have for their homosexual children. The third section is told from Killer's point of view as she explores a new relationship with Troy, an eccentric woman she has recently begun dating. Killer waters plants for money and sublets her apartments to European tourists, as she is unable and unwilling to seek a steady job.

The fourth and final section is presented as the first four chapters from Good and Bad, a fictional book about written Rita and David by their acquaintance Muriel Kay Starr. Muriel, who is a closeted lesbian, erased the queerness of each character so that her book would be commercially viable.

== Writing and structure ==
Rat Bohemia is Schulman's sixth novel. Like many of her previous novels, it is set in New York City and follows a cast of marginalized queer characters. The novel has an unorthodox story structure, with an emphasis on character and voice instead of plot. Edmund White suggested that this storytelling choice was an outgrowth of the rejection of Aristotelian literary conventions by feminist writers in the 1970s.

The novel was based on a monologue Schulman had written about a gay man with AIDS during the AIDS crisis. The monologue was the final section of a three-part show written by Schulman; it was preceded by "The Group", which starred Nora Burns and was described by Schulman as "a lesbian version of Boys in the Band," and "Killer In Love" which starred Mina Sharif. The third section of Rat Bohemia was also titled "Killer In Love". The three-part show was performed by Mark Ameen in the basement of Performance Space in New York City during the 1980s.

A primary theme of the novel is the impact that heteronormative hegemonies have on queer lives. It explores the way that social marginalization and homophobia creates experiences of isolation and poverty for queer people. Rats are used in the novel to symbolize the dehumanization of the urban poor and people with HIV, as well as the Reagan administration's neglect of these groups.

== Reception ==
The novel was published on Oct. 23, 1995 by E. P. Dutton. It became one of Schulman's most well-known novels. She stated that she frequently interacted with readers of the book, many of whom felt that it reflected their own experiences or helped them to understand themselves. However, she noted that many readers only understood the novel on a superficial level, and very rarely did "they read something that then gives them a deeper idea that they can bring back to me, and then we’re actually in a dynamic conversation."

Publishing Triangle named it one of the 100 Best Lesbian and Gay Novels. The novel was a finalist for the Lambda Literary Award for Lesbian Fiction at the 8th Lambda Literary Awards. It won the 1996 Ferro-Grumley Award.

American writer Edmund White gave the book a laudatory review in The New York Times. White had been diagnosed with HIV/AIDS and praised the novel for refraining from portraying the disease in overly sentimental terms. He observed "its gimlet-eyed accuracy, its zero-degree honesty, its charnel-house humor" and remarked that the decision to portray the AIDS crisis from the perspective of a lesbian was "ingenious". Schulman considered White's review to be a personal favor, describing it as "extremely supportive and kind" in a 2013 interview.

Feminist writer Vivian Gornick analyzed the book as a lament of parental and societal rejection that was emotionally moving but too repetitive and unchanging to have illuminate readers. She wrote that she was moved by "the melancholy and the grit behind the collective speaking voice, the spunk of its loneliness, the acuteness of its self-styled marginality." Gornick considered the book to be misnamed, arguing that the characters were not true "bohemians" because bohemianism was built upon a voluntary desire to live outside of bourgeois society, while the protagonists of the novel longed to be accepted by American society and their traditional families. Schulman later reflected that she agreed with Gornick's assessment, saying: "And I was like, You're right. That's it. All the other reviews, whether they rave, rave, rave, or hate, hate, hate, I never feel like they get it."

Kirkus Reviews gave it a mostly positive review, praising its handling of themes like poverty and HIV, but wrote that it suffered from occasional melodrama and self indulgence. Publishers Weekly called it "meandering tale of a city so befouled that it leaves the reader wishing for a bath." The review described the characters as flat and uninterested, with the exception of David.

Hugh Ryan gave the novel a retrospective review for LARB in 2016, wrote that he first read the book as a teenager after finding it in his local library in Irvington, New York. He wrote that the book "with its messy but real queer community, and a character with AIDS who wasn't a prop in some modern day morality play — felt like a reprieve from a death sentence no one else knew I carried."
