= Let the Record Show (Schulman book) =

2021 oral history of ACT UP by Sarah Schulman

Let the Record Show: A Political History of ACT UP New York, 1987–1993
- First edition
- Author: Sarah Schulman
- Language: English
- Genre: Oral history
- Publisher: Farrar, Straus and Giroux
- Publication date: 2021
- Publication place: United States
- Pages: 702
- ISBN: 9780374185138
- OCLC: 1182573401

Let the Record Show: A Political History of ACT UP New York, 1987–1993 is a 2021 oral history written by former ACT UP activist Sarah Schulman. Using 188 interviews conducted as part of the ACT UP Oral History Project, Schulman shows that the activist group was successful due to its dramatic and decentralized actions, and emphasizes the contributions of people of color and women to the movement.

== Summary ==
Schulman recounts different ACT UP members' experiences joining the movement and their contributions to large actions like Stop the Church and demonstrations in front of the Food and Drug Administration, New York Stock Exchange, and National Institutes of Health.

== Reception ==
Let the Record Show received starred reviews from Kirkus Reviews and Library Journal. Kirkus called the book "[v]ital, democratic truth-telling," and Library Journal noted, "This engaging, accessible book will find a wide audience among readers interested in activism from the ground up. It will also be a foundational document for historians for generations to come."

The critical reception to Let the Record Show has overall been positive, including a review in The New Yorker. The New York Times's Parl Sehgal explains, "This is a book about the past, written in the fury of the present — in the midst of another epidemic — but its gaze is fixed on the future. Let the Record Show doesn’t seek to memorialize history but to ransack it, to seize what we might need." Rebecca Makkai's review in The New York Times Book Review called Let the Record Show "a masterpiece tome: part sociology, part oral history, part memoir, part call to arms".

Publishers Weekly's primarily positive review noted, "Readers less familiar with ACT UP may wish for a clearer explanation of its organizational structure and more narrative cohesion than Schulman provides. Still, her firsthand perspective and copious details provide a valuable testament to the courage and dedication of many unheralded activists."

Freelance writer Vicky Osterweil criticized Let the Record Show in a Jewish Currents article in fall 2021. In an otherwise positive review, Osterweil said that Schulman had not accurately represented the presence and influence of trans members of ACT UP. A separate Jewish Currents response to Osterweil's article said Osterweil had misrepresented why Schulman disputed the presence of Black trans activists at the Stop the Church action.

Electric Literature and NPR named Let the Record Show one of the best nonfiction books of 2021. Gay Times named it one of the best LBTQ Books of 2021, and NBC included it in their list of the 10 Most Notable LGBTQ Books of 2021.

Awards for Let the Record Show
Year	Award	Result	Ref.
2021	Brooklyn Public Library Literary Prize	Longlist	
2022	Gotham Book Prize	Finalist	
2022	Israel Fishman Non-Fiction Award	Honor	
2022	Lambda Literary Award for Nonfiction	Winner	
2022	PEN/John Kenneth Galbriath Award	Finalist	
2022	Publishing Triangle Awards Special Award	Winner	
