= Ties That Bind: Familial Homophobia and Its Consequences =

- Author: Sarah Schulman
- Publication date: 2009

Ties That Bind: Familial Homophobia and Its Consequences is a 2009 non-fiction book by Sarah Schulman.

== Overview ==
The book is an examination of the phenomenon, causes and impact of familial homophobia.

== Reception ==
Hugh Ryan of Los Angeles Review of Books wrote that "Taken as a whole, Ties That Bind is one of a few recent books to examine on a granular level the actions, thoughts, and social structures that support and enable the oppression of queer people. It is an uncomfortable and important book, and one that has gotten far less attention than it deserves."

June Thomas of Lambda Literary Review praised the book, writing that "that familial, societal, and cultural homophobia is unjustified and that its victims deserve redress. She is stating it clearly and with substantiation. It’s a message that needs to be heard in all its complexity. People should read this book." Tom Lynch of New City Lit wrote that it "is of importance and her ideas quite provoking. Though perhaps a collection of specific stories from those who experienced homophobia in the home would’ve led to a stronger book, Schulman’s sensible arguments towards acceptance and equality cannot be ignored."

In the Open Library of Humanities, Amy Tziporah Karp analyzed how the observations of trauma described in Ties That Bind informed Schulman's fictional writing, specifically the novel Empathy (1992).
