= Barbara Wilson (author) =

American writer, publisher and translator

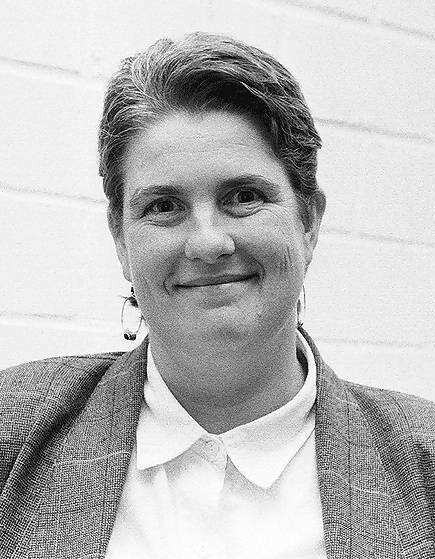
Barbara Wilson (1992)

Barbara Wilson (born 17 October 1950) is the pen name of Barbara Sjoholm, an American writer, editor, publisher, and translator. She co-founded two publishing companies: Seal Press and Women in Translation Press. As Barbara Sjoholm, she is the author of memoir, essays, a biography, and travelogues, including The Pirate Queen: In Search of Grace O’Malley and Other Legendary Women of the Sea, which was a finalist for the PEN USA award in creative nonfiction. She is also a translator of fiction and nonfiction by Norwegian and Danish writers into English, and won the Columbia Translation Award and the American-Scandinavian Translation Award. As Barbara Wilson, she has written two mystery series and has won several awards for her mystery novels, including the British Crime Writers Association award and the Lambda Literary Award. She is known for her novel Gaudi Afternoon, which was made into a film directed by Susan Seidelman in 2001.

== Biography ==
Wilson was born on 17 October 1950, in Long Beach, California. In 2000, she legally changed her name to 'Sjoholm' and writes under that name. She continues to publish mysteries under the last name of Wilson.

== Career ==
In 1976, Wilson co-founded the feminist publishing company Seal Press in Seattle, Washington with Rachel da Silva, and was an editor in addition to being a publisher. In 1989, she co-founded the nonprofit press Women in Translation Press, formerly an imprint of Seal Press, and was the director from 1989 to 2004.

Wilson was one of the first American authors to publish short stories, novels, and mystery novels featuring lesbian protagonists, and has two mystery novel series, one featuring a fictional Seattle-based printer named Pam Nilsen, and another featuring a London-based American translator, Cassandra Reilly. The first Cassandra Reilly book, Gaudi Afternoon, won several awards including the British Crime Writers Association Award and the Lambda Literary Award for Lesbian Mystery. In 2001, her book Gaudi Afternoon was adapted into a film of the same name, directed by Susan Seidelman. Wilson later expressed regrets that the aspects of lesbian identity present in the book were eliminated from the film. Slate described Wilson as a "genre pioneer" for her mystery novels. After a hiatus of many years, Wilson published a new mystery, Not the Real Jupiter, with her character Cassandra Reilly, in 2021. In 2021, she published an article in Crime Reads, "The Queer Old Case of the Spinster Sleuth" about older lesbians in crime fiction.

In addition to fiction, Wilson has published significant works of nonfiction. Her memoir, Blue Windows: A Christian Science Childhood, was a winner of the Lambda Literary Award and a finalist for the PEN USA award. Writing as Barbara Sjoholm, her nonfiction includes several travelogues, including a memoir of her travels as a young writer, Incognito Street. She wrote The Pirate Queen: In Search of Grace O’Malley and Other Legendary Women of the Sea, which was a finalist for the PEN USA award in creative nonfiction. In 2017, she published a biography of Danish artist, Emilie Demant Hatt, titled Black Fox. Sjoholm has also translated two books by Demant Hatt, the travel narrative, With the Lapps in the High Mountains, and By the Fire: Sami Folktales and Legends. Sjoholm's historical novel about the relationship between Emilie Demant Hatt and Danish composer Carl Nielsen, Fossil Island, won Best Indie award from the Historical Novel Society. Its sequel is The Former World.

As Barbara Sjoholm, she has also published many essays and travel articles in publications such as the New York Times, Smithsonian, LA Times, Slate, Harvard Review, American Scholar, Feminist Studies, and Scandinavian Studies.

== Awards and honors ==
Awards for Wilson's writing
| Year | Title | Award | Result | Ref. |
|---|---|---|---|---|
| 1984 | Cora Sandel: Selected Short Stories | Columbia Translation Award | | |
| 1990 | Dog Collar Murders | Lambda Literary Award for Lesbian Mystery | Finalist | |
| 1991 | Gaudi Afternoon | Lambda Literary Award for Lesbian Mystery | Winner | |
| 1991 | Gaudi Afternoon | British Crime Writers Association Award | | |
| 1993 | Trouble In Transylvania | Lambda Literary Award for Lesbian Mystery | Finalist | |
| 1997 | If You Had a Family | Lambda Literary Award for Lesbian Fiction | Finalist | |
| 1998 | Blue Windows: a Christian Science Childhood | Lambda Literary Award for Lesbian Biography/Autobiography | Winner | |
| 2000 | Salt Water and Other Stories | Lambda Literary Award for Lesbian Fiction | Finalist | |
| 2001 | The Case of the Orphaned Bassoonists | Lambda Literary Award for Lesbian Mystery | Finalist | |
| 2007 | Incognito Street | Lambda Literary Award for Lesbian Memoir or Biography | Finalist | |
| 1997 | Blue Windows | PEN Center USA West | Nominee | |
| 2008 | The Palace of the Snow Queen | PEN Center USA West | Nominee | |
| 2016 | Clearing Out | American Scandinavian Translation Award | Winner | |
| 2016 | Fossil Island | Historical Novel Society: Best Indie Novel | Winner | |
| 2020 | | GCLS Trailblazer Award | Winner | |

== Bibliography ==
=== Novels and Mysteries ===
- Ambitious Women, Spinsters Press (New York, NY), 1982.
- Cows and Horses, Eighth Mountain Press (Portland, OR), 1988.
- If You Had a Family, Seal Press (Seattle, WA), 1996.

==== Cassandra Reilly series ====
- Gaudi Afternoon, Seal Press (Seattle, WA), 1990. ISBN 9-781-48045-5177
- Trouble in Transylvania, Seal Press (Seattle, WA), 1993.
- The Death of a Much-travelled Woman and Other Adventures with Cassandra Reilly, Third Side Press (Chicago, IL), 1998.
- The Case of the Orphaned Bassoonists, Seal Press (Seattle, WA), 2000.
- Not the Real Jupiter (Cedar Street Editions), 2021

==== The Former World series ====
- Fossil Island (Cedar Street Editions) 2015 ISBN 9-780-98835-6740
- The Former World (Cedar Street Editions) 2015 ISBN 9-780-98835-6757

==== Pam Nilsen trilogy ====
- Murder in the Collective, Seal Press (Seattle, WA), 1984.
- Sisters of the Road, Seal Press (Seattle, WA), 1987.
- The Dog Collar Murders, Seal Press (Seattle, WA), 1989.

=== Short stories ===
- Talk and Contact, Seal Press (Seattle, WA), 1978.
- Thin Ice, Seal Press (Seattle, WA), 1981.
- Walking on the Moon: Six Stories and a Novella, Seal Press (Seattle, WA), 1983.
- Miss Venezuela, Seal Press (Seattle, WA), 1988.
- "Theft of the Poet," in A Woman's Eye, edited by Sara Paretsky, Dell, 1992.
- Salt Water and Other Stories, Alyson Press (Los Angeles, CA), 1999
- "Invisible," in Lesbian Travels: A Literary Companion, edited by Lucy Jane Bledsoe, Whereabouts Press, 1998.

=== Translations ===
- Cora Sandel: Collected Short Stories, Seal Press (Seattle, WA), 1985.
- Ebba Haslund, Nothing Happened, Seal Press (Seattle, WA), 1987.
- Liv Finstand and Cecelie Hoigard, Backstreets, Temple University (Philadelphia PA), 1992.
- Emilie Demant Hatt, With the Lapps in the High Mountains:A Woman Among the Sami, 1907–1908 (University of Wisconsin Press, 2013) ISBN 9-780-29929-2331
- Sigrid Lien, Pictures of Longing, University of Minnesota Press, 2018
- Helene Uri, Clearing Out, University of Minnesota Press, 2019
- Emilie Demant Hatt, By the Fire: Sami Folktales and Legends, University of Minnesota Press, 2019

=== Other writing ===
- Things That Divide Us, Sheba Feminist Publishers, 1986.
- Blue Windows: A Christian Science Childhood, Picador Press (New York, NY), 1997.
- A Clear Spring, Feminist Press at the City University of New York (New York, NY), 2002.
- Steady as She Goes: Women's Adventures at Sea, Seal Press (New York, NY), 2003. (Editor)
- The Pirate Queen: In Search of Grace O'Malley and Other Legendary Women of the Sea, Seal Press (Emeryville, CA), 2004.
- Incognito Street: How Travel Made Me a Writer, Seal Press (Emeryville, CA), 2006. ISBN 9-781-58005-6069
- The Palace of the Snow Queen: Winter Travels in Lapland, Shoemaker & Hoard (Emeryville, CA), 2007. ISBN 9-781-59376-1592
- An Editor's Guide to Working with Authors, Rainforest Press, 2011.
