= After Delores =

- Author: Sarah Schulman
- Genre: Lesbian crime fiction
- Publisher: Dutton Books
- Publication date: 1988

After Delores is a lesbian detective novel by Sarah Schulman.

== Plot ==
After being dumped by her girlfriend Delores, a lesbian waitress in the East Village attempts to solve the murder of a young woman.

== Writing and themes ==
The novel deals with themes of familial alienation and homophobia from family members. June Thomas wrote that "considerations of booze, sex, violence, and abandonment dominate the rest of the book."

== Publication ==
It was published by Dutton Books in 1988, and republished by Sheba Feminist Press in 1990. Arsenal Pulp Press republished it in 2013 for the book's 25th anniversary. It received a 1989 Stonewall Book Award from the American Library Association.

== Reception ==
Kinky Friedman praised the book's rawness and "rugged" charm, describing the protagonist as "a tortured, troubled soul who mesmerizes and repels us, sometimes managing to do both at the same time." PW wrote that "Schulman, a wry and passionate writer with an excellent eye for detail and ear for dialogue, has written a thoroughly up-to-date novel that makes Bright Lights, Big City and Less Than Zero seem thin and dated."

Kelly Cogswell of Gay City News praised its nuanced and realistic portrayal of the lesbian community.
