= The Sophie Horowitz Story =

1984 novel by Sarah Schulman

- Cover of the 1984 Naiad Press edition
- Author: Sarah Schulman
- Genre: Lesbian crime fiction
- Publisher: Naiad Press
- Publication date: 1984

The Sophie Horowitz Story is a lesbian crime novel by Sarah Schulman. It was published by Naiad Press in 1984.

== Plot ==
Reporter Sophie Horowitz investigates the story of Germaine Covington and Laura Wolfe, two radical feminist Marxists who robbed a bank. As she attempts to unravel the crime, she discovers further corruption and intrigues.

== Writing ==
The Sophie Horowitz Story is the debut novel of Sarah Schulman. She wrote the novel in 1982 while working as a waitress. Schulman described herself as "undereducated" at the time that she wrote the novel. She said that feminist critic Sally Munt later asked her why she used pastiche in the novel, and she replied "What's pastiche?"

The manuscript was rejected by most publishers that she presented it to. One editor at Doubleday praised Schulman's writing but rejected the book because of the lesbian content. The novel contains metafictional and satirical elements that subvert literary conventions of crime fiction. It was published by Naiad Press, a small lesbian fiction publisher, in 1984 and sold over 10,000 copies.

The novel is the first of three crime fiction novels written by Schulman, all of which contained sexually explicit content. The book was unusually fast-paced and explicit for Naiad Press, which usually published "slow-burn" lesbian novels aimed at middlebrow audiences. Like many of Schuman's later works, the novel deals with themes of familial rejection and homophobia, as Sophie's parents react negatively to her sexuality.

== Reception ==
Raven Bright praised the book in a review for The Lesbian Connection, writing that the protagonist's identity as a lesbian and a Jewish woman were autentically written. Bright also noted that unlike most lesbian novels at the time, it was not a coming out narrative. Anna Hill of Feminist Studies wrote that the novel's publication was a seminal moment in lesbian literature, as the popularity of coming out stories waned.

Joy Parks of the LesbianPride newsletter described the book as "one of the most entertaining books in lesbian literature", praising the irreverent protagonist and complex plot.
