= Stop the Church =

1989 protest in New York City

- Activist carried out of St. Patrick's Cathedral during the Stop the Church action
- Date: December 10, 1989
- Location: St. Patrick's Cathedral, New York, NY
- Type: Demonstration
- Theme: AIDS activism
- Participants: 4,500

Stop the Church was a demonstration organized by members of AIDS Coalition to Unleash Power (ACT UP) on December 10, 1989, that disrupted a Mass being said by Cardinal John O'Connor at St. Patrick's Cathedral in New York City. One-hundred and eleven protesters were arrested, 53 of whom were arrested inside the church. The main objective of the demonstration was to protest O'Connor's opposition to the teaching of safe sex in the public school system, and his opposition to the distribution of condoms to curb the spread of AIDS. During planning, the protest was joined by Women's Health Action and Mobilization (WHAM!), who opposed the Catholic position on abortion rights.

The protest was condemned in media editorials and by national figures such as President George H. W. Bush, and was controversial in the gay community. The protest, and especially the desecration of the Eucharist, made headline news in the US and several European countries. The protest was a major effort for ACT-UP.

== Background ==
O'Connor ministered to those dying at an AIDS hospice, bathing them and changing their bedpans, and supported others who did so.

ACT UP opposed the public position of the church on condom use and safe sex education to control the spread of AIDS, and identified pronouncements such as O'Connor's statement that "Good morality is good medicine" as harmful. The protest was organized following a meeting of senior clergy where they had reinforced doctrine opposing the use of condoms. ACT UP nicknamed the cleric "Cardinal O'Condom." They also opposed the church's anti-abortion position. In the 1980s, O'Connor wielded a great deal of power in both the church and in society at large. WHAM! subsequently joined the protest, swelling its numbers and adding the issue of abortion rights.

== Protest ==
Stop the Church was held on December 10, 1989, at St. Patrick's Cathedral in New York City. The idea had originated with ACT UP members Vincent Gagliostro and Victor Mendolia. Cardinal John O'Connor was celebrating a Mass attended by Mayor Ed Koch and other political leaders. Koch and the other dignitaries attended as a sign of support to O'Connor.

The protesters had indicated in advance that they planned to protest. While pretending to be church ushers, some handed out flyers explaining why they would disrupt the service to those entering the cathedral. The crowd outside grew to 4,500 people. The demonstrators stood outside the cathedral shouting and raising placards that read "Eternal life to Cardinal O'Connor now," "Know your scumbags," "Curb your dogma," "Papal Bull," and the like. Some tried to "storm" the church, but police stopped those who were obvious protesters from entering. Plainclothes police officers, expecting trouble, were sitting in the pews during Mass.

At the outset of Mass, O'Connor said he knew there were a number of protesters in attendance but asked for a peaceful service. Originally, the plan was a silent protest with a "die-in" during the homily portion of the Mass. When it appeared that the protest was having little effect on O'Connor, who continued on with Mass, Michael Petrelis stood on a pew and shouted, "You bigot O'Connor, you're killing us!" The cathedral then descended into "pandemonium." A few dozen activists interrupted Mass, chanted slogans, blew whistles, "kept up a banshee screech," chained themselves to pews, threw condoms in the air, waved their fists, and lay down in the aisles to stage a "die-in."

Ann Northrop was inside the Cathedral and said, "I happened to be the last person carried out, and by that time, everything had calmed down and was silent. So I started saying — and it was ringing through the cathedral — 'We're fighting for your lives, too. We're fighting for your lives, too.'" O'Connor asked worshipers to "pay no attention to" those disrupting the Mass. The organist also played in an attempt to drown the protesters out.

One protester, Tom Keane, took the consecrated Eucharist from the priest, crumbled it into pieces, and dropped the pieces to the floor. He then lay on the floor of the church in an attempt to prevent others from receiving Communion and was later arrested. Keane's desecration of the Eucharist became the biggest news story in the days to come. Years later, Keane said he decided to act in the moment and, while in hindsight he might not have repeated the act, he felt no regret.

== Reaction ==
One-hundred and eleven protesters were arrested, including 43 inside the church. Some, who refused to move, had to be carried out of the church on stretchers. Only minor charges were filed, punished primarily by community service sentences; some protesters who refused the sentences were tried, but did not serve jail time.

The protests were condemned by politicians and editorials in the major daily newspapers. Some in the gay community also considered that invading the privacy of worship was at odds with the gay community's arguments on sexual privacy. Mayor Ed Koch viewed it as disrespectful and New York Governor Mario Cuomo "deplored the demonstration." The cathedral protest was criticized as "stupid and wrong-headed" by Andy Humm, a spokesman for the Coalition for Gay and Lesbian Rights, while one ACT UP leader, Peter Staley, denounced the protest as an "utter failure" and a "selfish, macho thing."

During its planning, members of ACT UP were divided on the wisdom of the protest with some saying that protest should not target worshipers; others said it was more important to gain attention than it was to avoid offending the people attending the Mass. Shortly after the protest, Larry Kramer, Robert Garcia, Ann Northrop, Mark Harrington, and Peter Staley appeared on a television panel to discuss the protest, where they faced oftentimes hostile questions from the audience.

== Legacy ==
The protest became one of ACT UP's most well known actions. Protests at the cathedral continued for the next few years, though they were smaller and less disruptive. In 1992, another woman crumbled the Eucharist, but it was unclear if the action was tied to the larger protest. O'Connor feared, however, that it would start a trend, writing that while he would never "deny for a moment the right of peaceful protest," he believed "such desecration [of the Eucharist] bespeaks either madness, or hatred equivalent to madness, or something so inexpressible as to border on demonic."

Robert Hilferty's documentary about the protest, Stop the Church, was originally scheduled to air on PBS. The film was eventually dropped from national broadcast by PBS, but still aired on public-access television cable TV stations in several major cities including Los Angeles, New York City, and San Francisco. The documentary used footage filmed "guerrilla-style" by Hilferty, an ACTUP member.

"ACT UP activists now say the St. Patrick's protest changed the way many Americans viewed the Catholic Church. It was no longer untouchable, and its policies – on everything from condoms and abortion to gay marriage and women priests – were no longer sacrosanct." Filmmaker Jim Hubbard, a member of ACT UP and director of the documentary United in Anger: A History of ACT UP, said, "I wasn't clear about what going inside the church would add at the time. But now I think that the shock of going inside and confronting the cardinal really worked. It helped bring ACT UP to mainstream attention. It brought the crisis to a point where the government and the mainstream media really had to start dealing with it."

In June 2019, the main characters of the television series Pose, participate in the Stop the Church action and are arrested.

== See also ==
- Eucharist in the Catholic Church
- HIV/AIDS activism
- Anti-Catholicism in the United States

== Works cited ==
- Faderman, Lillian (2015). The Gay Revolution. Simon & Schuster. ISBN 9781451694130.
- Riemer, Matthew; Brown, Leighton (May 7, 2019). We Are Everywhere: Protest, Power, and Pride in the History of Queer Liberation. Potter/Ten Speed/Harmony/Rodale. ISBN 978-0-399-58182-3.
- Petro, Anthony Michael (2015). After the Wrath of God: AIDS, Sexuality, and American Religion. Oxford University Press. ISBN 978-0-19-939128-8.
