= The Gentrification of the Mind: Witness to a Lost Imagination =

2012 memoir by Sarah Schulman

- Author: Sarah Schulman
- Language: English
- Genre: Non-fiction, memoir
- Publisher: University of California Press
- Publication date: February 6, 2012
- Publication place: United States
- Pages: 352
- Awards: Lambda Literary Award for Lesbian Memoir or Biography (finalist, 2013)
- ISBN: 9780520264779

The Gentrification of the Mind: Witness to a Lost Imagination is a memoir by American AIDS historian and activist Sarah Schulman, published in 2012 by University of California Press. The book links the AIDS epidemic in the United States in the 1980s to the process of gentrification, with a focus on New York City. It was nominated for the 2013 Lambda Literary Award for Lesbian Memoir or Biography.

== Reception ==
Olivia Laing on New Statesman described the book as "a polemic, a passionate, provocative and at times scattergun account of disappearance, forgetfulness and untimely death". According to Emily Douglas on the Los Angeles Review of Books, the book provides "a galvanizing account of the transformation, both external and mental, in New York City life", but "with limited empathy for, or insight into, what making a life in the city requires today".

Slate listed the book as one of the overlooked books of 2012, describing it as a "heartbreaking memoir and a get-off-your-ass polemic".
