= Sarah Schulman =

American writer (born 1958)

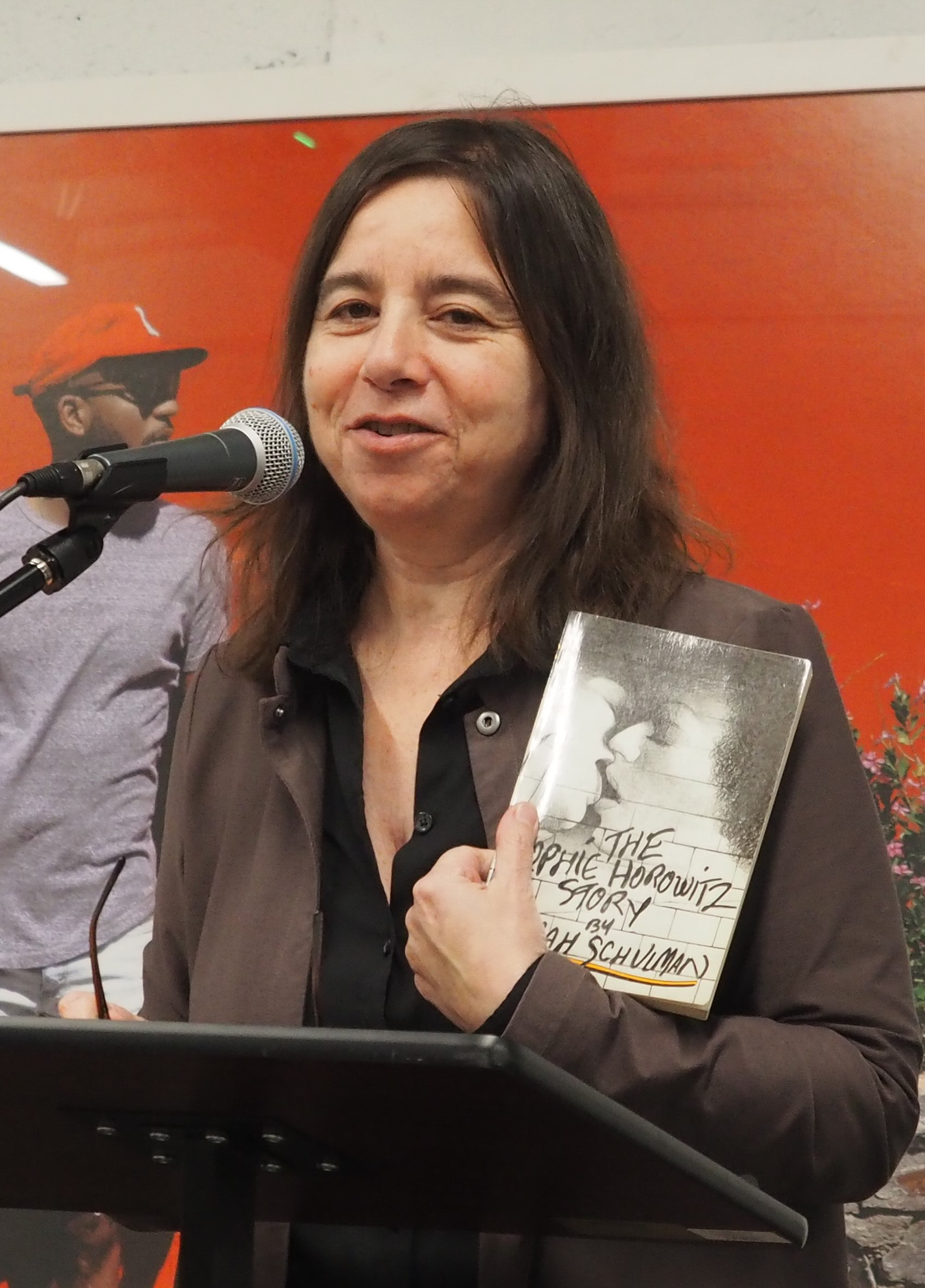
- Schulman in 2018
- Born: Sarah Miriam Schulman; July 28, 1958 (age 68); New York City, U.S.
- Education: Hunter College High School; University of Chicago; Empire State College (BA)
- Occupations: Novelist; historian; playwright; screenwriter; journalist; activist
- Relatives: Helen Schulman (sister)

Sarah Miriam Schulman (born July 28, 1958) is an American novelist, playwright, nonfiction writer, screenwriter, gay activist, and AIDS historian. She holds an endowed chair in nonfiction at Northwestern University and is a fellow of the New York Institute for the Humanities. She is a recipient of the Bill Whitehead Award and the Lambda Literary Award.

== Early life and education ==
Sarah Schulman was born to a Jewish family in New York City on July 28, 1958. Her grandparents were refugees, some of whose siblings were murdered in the Holocaust. She has called her family "homophobic" and wrote a book on that subject.

Schulman graduated from Hunter College High School in New York. She then attended the University of Chicago from 1976 to 1978, but did not graduate. She subsequently earned a Bachelor of Arts degree from Empire State College in Saratoga Springs, New York.

== Literary career ==
Schulman published her first novel, The Sophie Horowitz Story, in 1984. It was followed in 1986 by Girls, Visions and Everything—which is considered important in lesbian subcultures.

Schulman's third novel, After Delores, received a positive review in The New York Times, was translated into eight languages, and was awarded an American Library Association Stonewall Book Award in 1989. People In Trouble appeared in 1990 and Empathy in 1992. The novelist Edmund White reviewed her next novel, Rat Bohemia (1995), for the New York Times, and it was named one of the 100 best LGBT books by The Publishing Triangle.

Subsequent novels include Shimmer (1998), The Child (2007), and The Mere Future (2009). Publishers Weekly named The Cosmopolitans one of the best American novels of 2016. In 2018, Schulman published Maggie Terry, a return to and comment on the lesbian detective novel, addressing life under President Donald Trump.

Stagestruck: Theater, AIDS, and the Marketing of Gay America (1998), which won the Stonewall Book Award, argues that significant plot elements of the successful 1996 musical Rent were lifted from her 1990 novel People in Trouble. The heterosexual plot of Rent is based on the opera La Bohème, while the gay plot is similar to Schulman's novel. Schulman never sued, but analyzed in Stagestruck the way the musical depicts AIDS and gay people, in contrast to work made by those communities that year.

In 2009, The New Press published Ties That Bind: Familial Homophobia and Its Consequences, which was nominated for a Lambda Literary Award. The Gentrification of the Mind: Witness to a Lost Imagination was published by the University of California Press in 2013. Slate called it one of the 10 "Best Most Unknown Books" and GalleyCat called it one of the "Best Unrecognized Books" of the year. It was also nominated for a Lambda Literary Award. Israel/Palestine and the Queer International was published by Duke University Press in 2012, and was nominated for a Lambda Literary Award. Her 2016 book Conflict Is Not Abuse: Overstating Harm, Community Responsibility and the Duty of Repair, published by Arsenal Pulp Press, was nominated for a Lambda Literary Award and won a Judy Grahn Award by the Publishing Triangle.

In 2016, Schulman was named one of Publishers Weekly's 60 Most Underrated Writers.

In 2018, the second edition of her 1994 collection My American History: Lesbian and Gay Life During the Reagan/Bush Years was issued including new material by Urvashi Vaid, Stephen Thrasher, and Alison Bechdel.

Let the Record Show: A Political History of the AIDS Coalition to Unleash Power New York (ACT UP, New York 1987–1993) was published by Farrar, Straus, and Giroux in 2021, and was a finalist for both the 2019 and 2020 J. Anthony Lukas Book Prize for Works-In-Progress and for the 2022 PEN/John Kenneth Galbraith Award for Nonfiction. It won a special award from the Publishing Triangle, the Lambda Literary Award for LGBTQ Nonfiction, and a prize from the National Organization of LGBT Journalists. It was a New York Times Notable Book of 2021. Cleveland Review of Books said it combines "acute political and social analysis with in-depth portraits of human beings".

Her nonfiction book The Fantasy and Necessity of Solidarity was published by Penguin Random House's Thesis Books in April 2025.

== Activism ==
Schulman's activism began in her childhood when she protested the Vietnam War with her mother. She was active in the Women's Union while a student at the University of Chicago from 1976 to 1978. From 1979 to 1982, Schulman was a member of the Committee for Abortion Rights and Against Sterilization Abuse (CARASA) and participated in an early direct action protest in which she and five others (called the Women's Liberation Zap Action Brigade) disrupted an anti-abortion hearing in Congress. She was an active member of ACT UP from 1987 to 1992, attending actions at the FDA, NIH, and Stop the Church, and was arrested when ACT UP occupied Grand Central Station protesting the First Gulf War.

In 1987, Schulman and filmmaker Jim Hubbard co-founded the New York Lesbian and Gay Experimental Film Festival, now called MIX NYC.

In 1992, Schulman and five other women co-founded the Lesbian Avengers, a direct action organization. On her 1992 book tour for Empathy, Schulman visited gay bookstores in the South to start chapters. The organization's high points included founding the first Dyke March during the March on Washington for Lesbian, Gay and Bi Equal Rights and Liberation, and sending groups of young organizers to Maine and Idaho to assist local fights against anti-gay ballot initiatives.

Since 2001, Schulman and Jim Hubbard have been creating the ACT UP Oral History Project, interviewing 188 surviving members of ACT UP over 18 years. They produced a feature documentary, United in Anger: A History of ACT UP, which premiered at the Museum of Modern Art in 2010. Harvard purchased the archive for their collection, while maintaining free access, and the funds were used to produce United in Anger.

In 2009, Schulman declined an invitation to Tel Aviv University in support of Palestine and the Boycott, Divestment and Sanctions. She is on the advisory board of Jewish Voice for Peace and was faculty advisor to Students for Justice in Palestine at the College of Staten Island, and is currently faculty advisor to Jewish Voice for Peace and the Trans Studies Roundtable at Northwestern University. In 2011, she published an op-ed in the New York Times on pinkwashing, a term Ali Abunimah coined to describe how the Israeli government uses LGBT rights in its public relations. Since 2010 she has served on the Advisory Board of Jewish Voice for Peace. She supports a boycott of Israeli cultural institutions, including publishers and literary festivals. She was an original signatory of the manifesto "Refusing Complicity in Israel's Literary Institutions".

While employed as a university professor, Schulman continued to teach and mentor writers through a number of community-based initiatives including the Lambda Literary Foundation, Queer Artists Mentorship, an independent workshop for trans women writers sponsored by Topside Press, the Fine Arts Work Center in Provincetown and a number of workshops run out of her apartment before the onset of the COVID-19 pandemic. She curates First Mondays: Free Readings of New Works In Progress, at Performance Space New York, held on the first Monday of each month.

In 2017, she joined the advisory board of Claudia Rankine's Racial Imaginary Institute.

== Theater ==
From 1979 to 1994, Schulman had 15 plays produced in the context of the avant-garde Downtown Arts Scene, based in New York City's East Village. Venues included the University of the Streets, P.S. 122, La Mama, King Tut's Wah-Wah Hut, the Pyramid Club, 8BC, Franklin Furnace, The Kitchen, Ela Troyano and Uzi Parness' Club Chandelier, Here, and the Performing Garage. Schulman was admitted into the Sundance Theater Lab in 2001 with the play Carson McCullers, based on the life of the 20th century writer. The workshop starred Angelina Phillips and Bill Camp and was directed by Craig Lucas. It had its world premiere at Playwrights Horizons in 2002, directed by Marion McClinton and starring Jenny Bacon. This was followed by "Manic Flight Reaction" at Playwrights Horizons, directed by Trip Cullman and starring Deirdre O'Connell.

Schulman secured the rights to write an adaptation of Isaac Bashevis Singer's Enemies, A Love Story, which premiered at the Wilma Theater in Philadelphia in 2007, directed by Jiri Ziska and starring Morgan Spector. It later had a New York reading at the New York Theatre Workshop, directed by Jo Bonney.

In 2018, Schulman's play Between Covers was included in the New Stages Festival at the Goodman Theatre in Chicago, her play Roe Versus Wade had a reading at the New York Theatre Workshop, and she was commissioned by BMG and the Manchester Factory to write the book for The Snow Queen, a theatrical work highlighting the music of Marianne Faithfull.

In 2021, her play The Lady Hamlet premiered at the Provincetown Theater, starring Jennifer Van Dyck, and won the Best New Play award from Broadway World/Boston.

In May 2023, the musical adaptation of Schulman's 1998 novel Shimmer had its first workshop at Yale, with music by Anthony Davis and lyrics by Michael Korie. It was directed by Jess McLeod. A second workshop took place in January 2024 at Northwestern University.

== Film ==
In 2009, Schulman and Cheryl Dunye wrote the screenplay for Dunye's film The Owls, starring Guinevere Turner, Lisa Gornick, Cheryl Dunye, and V. S. Brodie. The film premiered at the 60th Berlin International Film Festival in 2010. She and Dunye then wrote the X-rated film Mommy Is Coming, which was produced in Germany by Jürgen Brüning and selected for the 2012 Berlin International Film Festival.

Schulman and Jim Hubbard co-produced his documentary United in Anger: A History of ACT UP, which premiered at the Museum of Modern Art on February 16, 2012. The film's international premiere was in Ramallah, Palestine. It won Best Documentary at both MIX Milan and ReelQ in Pittsburgh.

Schulman played filmmaker Shirley Clarke to Jack Waters's Jason Holliday in Stephen Winter's Jason and Shirley, a response to Clarke's 1967 documentary Portrait of Jason that premiered at BAMcinemaFest in June 2015 and played for a week at the Museum of Modern Art in October 2015.

== Published works ==
=== Fiction ===
- The Sophie Horowitz Story (Naiad Press, 1984)
- Girls, Visions and Everything (Seal, 1986)
- After Delores (Plume Books, 1989)
- People in Trouble (Dutton, 1990)
- Empathy (Dutton, 1992)
- Rat Bohemia (Dutton, 1995)
- Shimmer (Bard, 1998)
- The Child (Carroll & Graf, 2007)
- The Mere Future (Arsenal Pulp, 2011)
- The Cosmopolitans (Feminist Press, 2016)
- Maggie Terry (Feminist Press, 2018)
- Anywhere, Anywhere (Feminist Press, 2027)

=== Nonfiction ===
- My American History: Lesbian and Gay Life During the Reagan/Bush years (Routledge, 1994)
- Stagestruck: Theater, AIDS, and the marketing of gay America (Duke University Press, 1998)
- Ties That Bind: Familial Homophobia and Its Consequences (New Press, 2009)
- Israel/Palestine and the Queer International (Duke University Press, 2012)
- The Gentrification of the Mind: Witness to a Lost Imagination (University of California Press, 2012)
- Conflict is Not Abuse: Overstating Harm, Community Responsibility, and the Duty of Repair (Arsenal Pulp Press, 2016)
- Let the Record Show: A Political History of ACT UP New York, 1987-1993 (Farrar, Straus and Giroux, 2021)
- Conversations with Sarah Schulman, edited by Will Brantley (University Press of Mississippi, 2024)
- The Fantasy and Necessity of Solidarity (Thesis Books, Penguin Randomhouse, April 2025)

=== Plays ===
==== Published ====
- Mercy (2009), published in Robert Glück, Sarah Schulman (Belladonna Books, 2008)
- Carson McCullers (2003) (Playscripts Inc., 2006)

==== Produced ====
- Enemies, A Love Story (adapted from Isaac Bashevis Singer) (Wilma Theater, 2007)
- Carson McCullers (Playwrights Horizons, 2005)
- Manic Flight Reaction (Playwrights Horizons, 2005)
- The Lady Hamlet (Provincetown Theater, 2022)

== Filmography ==
- Jason and Shirley (directed by Steven Winter, 2015)
- United in Anger: A History of ACT UP (co-producer, directed by Jim Hubbard, 2012)
- Mommy Is Coming (directed by Cheryl Dunye, 2011)
- The Owls (directed by Cheryl Dunye, 2009)

== Honors and awards ==
- Guggenheim Fellowship in Playwrighting, 2001
- Fulbright for Judaic Studies
- 2 New York Foundation for the Arts Fellowships in Fiction
- New York Foundation for the Arts Fellowship in Playwriting
- Kessler Prize for Sustained Contribution to LGBT Studies from CLAGS: The Center for LGBTQ Studies
- Revson Fellowship
- Fellow at the New York Institute for the Humanities, New York University
- 9 residencies at the MacDowell Colony
- 5 residencies at Yaddo
- Two-time honoree for the American Library Association Stonewall Book Awards
- Brown Foundation/Houston Arts Museum Fellowship at the Dora Maar House in Ménerbes
- Fellowship at The Mark S. Bonham Centre for Sexual Diversity Studies
- 2 Publishing Triangle Awards (Fiction and Nonfiction)
- 2018 Bill Whitehead Award for Lifetime Achievement
- 2021 The Ann Snitow Prize
- 2022 PEN/John Kenneth Galbraith Award for Nonfiction, Finalist, for Let the Record Show
- 2023 Selected as a judge in Nonfiction for the National Book Award

== See also ==
- LGBT culture in New York City
- List of LGBT people from New York City
