= Michael Petrelis =

American activist (born 1959)

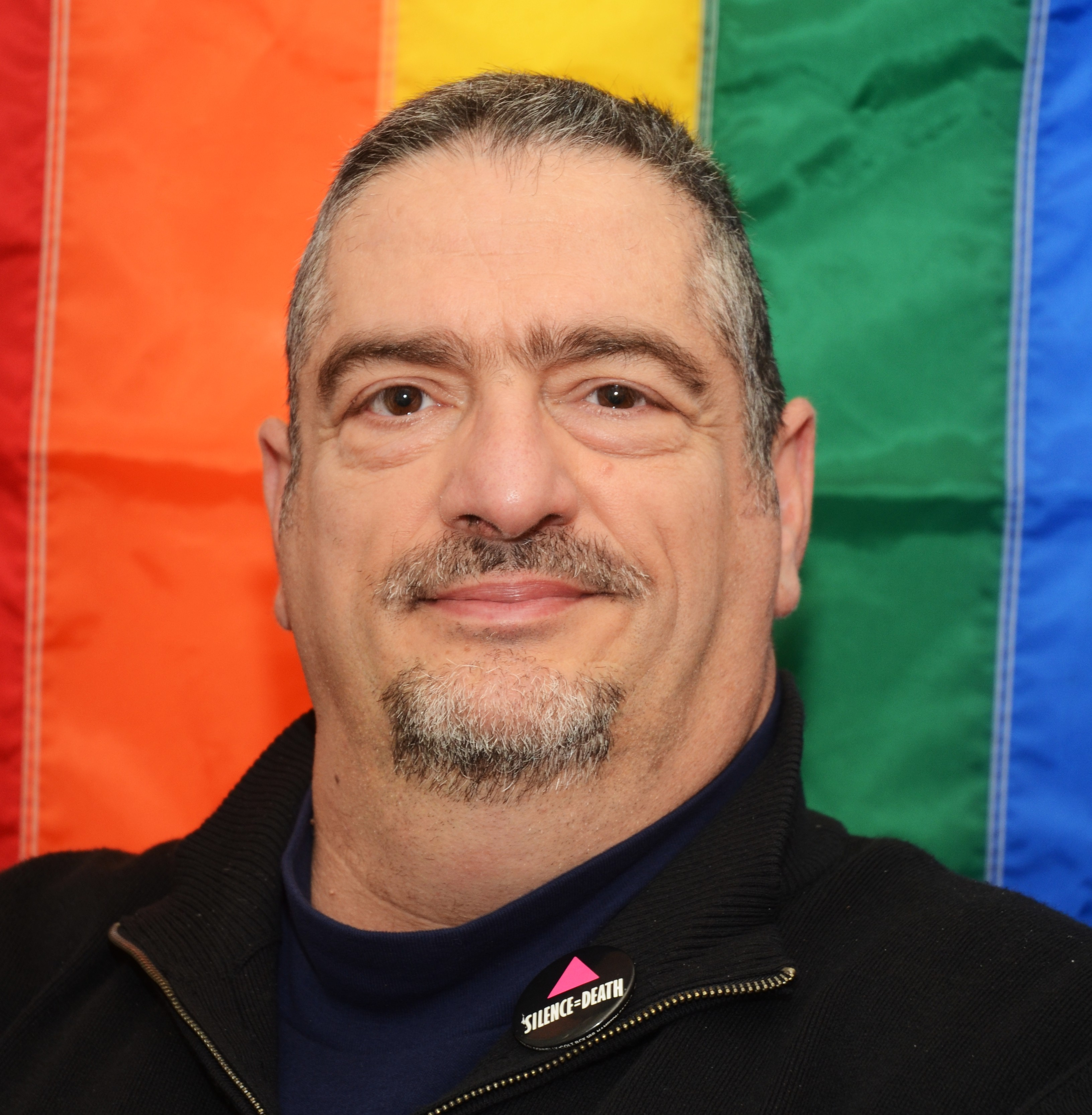
- Petrelis in 2013
- Born: January 26, 1959 (age 67); Newark, New Jersey, U.S.
- Occupations: AIDS and LGBTQ rights activist, blogger
- Website: mpetrelis.blogspot.com

Michael Anthony Petrelis (born January 26, 1959) is an American AIDS activist, LGBTQ rights activist, and blogger. He was diagnosed with Acquired Immunodeficiency Syndrome (AIDS) in 1985 in New York City, New York. As a member of the Lavender Hill Mob, a forerunner to the AIDS Coalition to Unleash Power (ACT UP), he was among the first AIDS activists to protest responses to the disease. He was a co-founding member of ACT UP in New York City, New York, and later helped organize ACT UP chapters in Portland, Oregon, Washington, D.C., and New Hampshire, as well as the ACT UP Presidential Project. Petrelis was also a founding member of Queer Nation/National Capital, the Washington D.C. chapter of the militant LGBTQ rights organization.

In 1990, he organized a nationwide boycott of products manufactured by Philip Morris Companies, Inc. (now Altria Group, Inc.), including Marlboro cigarettes and Miller beer, to protest the company's support for Jesse Helms, a Republican senator from North Carolina whose rhetoric and policy positions Petrelis said were harmful to LGBTQ communities. Petrelis was among several activists who disclosed, in 1989, that Mark Hatfield, a Republican senator from Oregon who supported anti-gay legislation, was secretly gay, the first such political outing of an elected official by American activists. Over the next few years, Petrelis became an outspoken proponent of outing and one of its most prominent practitioners; at a 1990 press conference on the steps of the U.S. Capitol, he outed a dozen public figures, although no news outlets published the names, and he played a pivotal role in the 1991 outing of Assistant Secretary of Defense for Public Affairs Pete Williams by writer Michelangelo Signorile in The Advocate, an American LGBT-interest magazine.

When Terry M. Helvey and an accomplice, Charles E. Vins, murdered Helvey's shipmate, U.S. Navy Seaman Allen R. Schindler, Jr. in October 1992, because Schindler was gay, Petrelis traveled twice to Japan to press the Navy for justice on Schindler's behalf and to monitor the trial, while raising awareness of the hate crime in the U.S.

After relocating to San Francisco, California, in 1995, Petrelis successfully lobbied the city's Department of Public Health (SFDPH) to make the female condom available to gay men, and advocated reopening the gay bathhouses there. He also founded the AIDS Accountability Project, a watchdog organization that obtained IRS tax forms 990 from nonprofit AIDS service organizations, then published the financial information disclosed therein online. He currently lives with his partner of eighteen years, Mike Merrigan, and writes a blog called The Petrelis Files. On April 5, 2014, Petrelis announced his candidacy for the San Francisco Board of Supervisors, running against incumbent Scott Wiener for the District 8 seat, representing the Castro, Noe Valley, Diamond Heights, and Glen Park neighborhoods of San Francisco.

In January 1999, Out magazine included Petrelis in the Out 100, recognizing him, for creating the AIDS Accountability Project, as one of the "people who defined 1998". The Advocate has published a variety of articles about him, one in August 1999, named Petrelis among its "Best and Brightest Activists" citing the AIDS Accountability Project and other controversial causes while another from 2002 spoke less glowingly about him.

Petrelis has been involved in several controversies related to his protest tactics. In the early 2000s, he and another activist were charged after making repeated late-night phone calls to journalists and public-health officials; the case included allegations of stalking, conspiracy, and criminal harassment, and they ultimately pleaded no contest to misdemeanor charges involving threatening or harassing calls. Years later, Petrelis drew additional criticism when he attempted to photograph local politician Scott Wiener in a restroom at San Francisco City Hall during a protest related to Wiener's stance on public nudity laws. A judge subsequently issued an order requiring Petrelis to stay away from Wiener.

== Early years and influences ==
Petrelis was born in Newark, New Jersey, where he lived for "four or five" years before his family moved to Caldwell, a nearby suburb. According to a family legend, his maternal grandmother once created a scene when his mother failed to win a Shirley Temple look-alike contest in Newark, overturning the judges' table and screaming, "This is a mafia-rigged beauty contest! My daughter's the most beautiful one!" Petrelis said of the legend, "...of course, I wasn't there, and you don't necessarily inherit that kind of whatever it takes to do it, but sometimes, you've just got to overturn some tables and remember that, for me, I have a Mediterranean background and that anger is okay."

Petrelis attended an alternative high school in East Orange, New Jersey, where he was openly gay. He remembers first becoming involved with the gay community as a teenager, traveling to the Greenwich Village neighborhood of New York City. In the city, Petrelis discovered he could make money as a sex worker and engaged in "lots and lots of unsafe sex." After graduating high school in 1977, he spent the following summer hitchhiking across the United States to San Francisco, California, where he lived for the next three years.

In San Francisco, Petrelis witnessed the White Night riots at San Francisco City Hall, a reaction to the lenient sentencing of Dan White, convicted of killing San Francisco Mayor George Moscone and openly gay Supervisor Harvey Milk. Petrelis remembers feeling outrage on hearing the news of White's sentence and said of the property destruction he had watched that night, "I remember feeling that was okay — that you had to have this destruction of personal property to send a message...to gay people here in San Francisco— [White's lenient sentence] is not okay. And we had to look out for ourselves — even with the relative liberal attitudes of San Francisco."

Petrelis moved to New York, in 1981, where he renewed his acquaintance with a male couple he knew from his teenage visits to the city. One of these men was the first of Petrelis' friends to die of the disease that would later come to be known as acquired immunodeficiency syndrome (AIDS).

== AIDS diagnosis ==
Through the early months and spring of 1985, Petrelis suffered from a persistent illness that one doctor diagnosed as influenza; by that summer, he had developed a "bump" on his arm and was referred to a dermatologist at New York University (NYU) Hospital. At first, Petrelis balked; earning his living as a temporary office worker, he had neither insurance nor money to pay a dermatologist. Urged by the referring physician, he relented.

At NYU Hospital, Dr. Patrick N. Hennessey removed a biopsy of the suspicious lesion and stitched the incision. Petrelis remembered not wanting to return to have the stitches removed, again for lack of insurance and money, assuming that "if there's bad news, they'll call me up and tell me." When Hennessey's office did call and insisted Petrelis must see the doctor, he resolved to "...worry about payment later."

On the afternoon of August 26, 1985, Petrelis returned to Hennessey's office for removal of the stitches. Hennessey explained the results of the biopsy: the lesion was Kaposi's sarcoma, an opportunistic infection. He told Petrelis he had AIDS and that more such opportunistic infections would follow. His prognosis was terminal, with six months to a year to live. Henley advised him to go to the Gay Men's Health Crisis (GMHC) as soon as possible, draft a will, and find a doctor.

== Introduction to activism ==
Upon hearing news of Petrelis' AIDS diagnosis, the friend with whom Petrelis lived asked him to leave; he was soon sleeping on numerous friends' couches and engaged in his first campaign: to pressure the city to support the AIDS Resource Center's (ARC) proposed purchase of the River Hotel on Christopher Street at the West Side Highway. With help from Mayor Edward Koch's administration, ARC planned to open the first residence for people with AIDS in the United States. Also active in the campaign were Andy Humm of the Coalition for Gay and Lesbian Rights (CLGR), Buddy Noro of People With AIDS, and Bill Bahlman and Marty Robinson of the Gay and Lesbian Anti-defamation League (now the Gay and Lesbian Alliance Against Defamation, or GLAAD).

Robinson, whom Petrelis remembered meeting by chance one night outside New York City's Lesbian, Gay, Bisexual & Transgender Community Center on West 13th Street, as the two men waited for a GLAAD meeting to begin, was a veteran activist. Throughout the 1960s, he had been active in the Mattachine Society, one of the first homophile organizations in the United States. He was present at the Stonewall Inn, a Greenwich Village bar, when officers from the New York City Police Department raided it on June 28, 1969, sparking the resistance known as the Stonewall riots, and he was a featured speaker at the subsequent rally in Sheridan Square, attended by two thousand people. In the aftermath of the Stonewall riots, he co-founded the Gay Activist Alliance (GAA), where he was credited with developing the zap, a protest tactic that would become a central component of ACT UP's strategy.

Frustrated with what Bahlman called the "timid sort of nature" of GLAAD's and CLGR's tactics in the face of the AIDS crisis, Robinson and Noro determined that they needed to start a new group. In the late summer of 1986, in the wake of the Supreme Court of the United States' ruling in Bowers v. Hardwick, they began meeting with a small group of friends at Bahlman's apartment. In addition to Robinson, Noro, and Bahlman, early participants included Henry Yaeger Jean Elizabeth Glass Eric Perez, and Petrelis. The group would come to call itself the Lavender Hill Mob, after a well-known comic British film — a title they believed captured the personality of the group and its actions: gay, confrontational, creative, and humorous.

Petrelis recalled, during this time, attending a community meeting at St. Vincent's Hospital at which he, alone, confronted Koch advisor John LoCicero and Carol Greitzer, Councilwoman from New York City's Third District where the River Hotel was located. Petrelis believed Greitzer was "dragging her heels on this deal". Without waiting for the question and answer session, and without fear of arrest, Petrelis says he "just let them have it."

Petrelis also helped organize a Lavender Hill Mob demonstration, camping overnight in a tent outside Gracie Mansion, to protest the city's year-long delay in approving the contract and signing the paperwork for the River Hotel project. Bahlman believed the protest was instrumental; the city approved the contract within days.

Named Bailey House in honor of the Reverend Mead Miner Bailey, one of ARC's founders, the facility finally opened on December 10, 1986. Petrelis was among its first residents.

== Lavender Hill Mob's opposition to mandatory AIDS testing ==
On February 24, 1987, Petrelis traveled with Bill Bahlman, Eric Perez, Marty Robinson, and Henry Yaeger to Atlanta, Georgia, where the Centers for Disease Control (CDC) had convened the largest meeting yet held on the subject of AIDS. Eight hundred state and federal health officials attended the two-day conference to discuss proposed CDC guidelines for the use of AIDS antibody testing in preventing the spread of the disease; specifically, the CDC was considering whether to recommend such testing of patients admitted to hospitals, patients seeking clinical treatment for family planning, drug addiction or sexually transmitted diseases, prison inmates, and couples planning to marry.

On the first afternoon, Petrelis, dressed in a mock concentration camp uniform with a pink triangle, told a panel on confidentiality, "There's no such thing as confidentiality. I can tell you, as soon as you get on Social Security, your disability is AIDS, and everybody knows it." Petrelis accused federal health officials of genocide in mishandling the AIDS epidemic and said, "You locked up the Japanese during World War II, and you'll do it again if you want to. You should start talking about new treatments." Lavender Hill Mob members also passed out leaflets that said "Test drugs, not people," and referred to the CDC as "Center for Detention Camps."

Lavender Hill Mob members interrupted CDC deputy director Walter Dowdles' concluding remarks on the second day of the meeting, forcing the final plenary session to an early end with a "noisy demonstration accusing federal health officials of Nazism and genocide for debating the use of the AIDS test while people are dying for lack of a cure."

The Lavender Hill Mob also criticized representatives of established lesbian and gay organizations attending the meeting, interrupting their joint press conference on the second day of the meeting. Urvashi Vaid was at the podium when Petrelis stood from his seat at the back of the room and shouted, "You've sold out the gay community!" Petrelis accused the community leaders of being "really out of touch" with the gay community's frustration and anger. "After six years there has been no action. And you guys are coming in here and acting as though what happened today is something to be applauded."

On April 30, 1987, Petrelis and Robinson were at Georgetown University in Washington, D.C. to disrupt an appearance by William Bennet, then Secretary of Education in the Ronald Reagan administration. In a speech, approved by the White House and given to a group of students on the last day of classes, Bennet advocated mandatory AIDS testing for people convicted of crimes, people admitted to hospitals or seeking care at clinics, "perhaps particularly those serving high-risk populations," people applying to settle in the United States, and couples applying to marry. Petrelis and Robinson distributed leaflets saying, "No condoms, no sex, no privacy, no freedom, no choice, no reality, & no cure." When Bennett invited questions from the audience, Petrelis and Robinson stood, unfurled a purple banner that said "Lavender Hill Mob," and shouted, "Test drugs, not people. We're dying. We're dying." Petrelis screamed, "I have AIDS, but it's taken President Reagan six years to say the word AIDS." Campus security officers removed Petrelis and Robinson from the room, and detained them for half an hour before releasing them.

== The AIDS Coalition to Unleash Power (ACT UP) ==
Upon his return from the CDC protest in Atlanta, Petrelis received a call from playwright Larry Kramer, asking to meet. Having read the news of the Lavender Hill Mob's actions at the CDC, Kramer wanted to discuss such confrontational tactics as ringing the White House with protesters, disrupting congress, and shutting down Wall Street. Kramer told Petrelis he was giving a speech at the Lesbian, Gay, Bisexual & Transgender Community Center on the upcoming Tuesday night, as a last-minute substitute for the scheduled speaker, writer Nora Ephron. Kramer urged Petrelis to invite everyone he knew.

On March 10, 1987, Petrelis was among approximately seventy-five people at the community center when Kramer gave the speech that marked the foundation of the AIDS Coalition to Unleash Power (ACT UP). In his speech, Kramer cited the attention achieved by the Lavender Hill Mob at the CDC in Atlanta, crediting the group's "blissfully rude" protest. After the speech, Petrelis stood and suggested they organize a public demonstration in New York City. "We need people," he shouted. "We have all got to get arrested.'

When ACT UP staged its first demonstration two weeks later, two hundred and fifty people descended on Wall Street to protest the relationship between the Food and Drug Administration (FDA) and Burroughs Wellcome, the maker of AZT, charging the pharmaceutical manufacturer with profiteering. They hung an effigy of FDA Commissioner Frank Young in front of Trinity Church and tied up traffic for hours. Petrelis was one of seventeen demonstrators arrested for acts of civil disobedience.

In October 1988, Petrelis traveled to Portland, Oregon, where he organized a local chapter of the AIDS Coalition to Unleash Power: ACT UP/Portland. There, he was arrested with three others protesting the airing of a television drama by NBC affiliate KGW-TV that depicted violence against a character with AIDS, helped block traffic on Burnside Bridge to protest passage of Ballot Measure 8, quarreled with state health officials who demanded the return of five thousand state-supplied condoms after they discovered ACT UP meant to distribute the condoms outside a high school, criticized a state-sponsored series of AIDS awareness advertisements for not using the word "gay", and was arrested with ten others outside the Portland office of the Food and Drug Administration (FDA) protesting the agency's failure to release four promising new drugs.

Petrelis returned to New York City a year later, where he was one of 111 protesters arrested at the Stop the Church demonstration at St. Patrick's Cathedral on December 11, 1989. The demonstration was among ACT Up's most controversial, but Petrelis almost didn't participate; none of the other activists wanted to include him in their affinity groups for that demonstration because, he recalled, "People felt I was too angry." Petrelis said he nonetheless felt driven to go and changed his mind. Arriving early before the police had established barricades, Petrelis was able to enter the church, and sit on the aisle in the middle of the cathedral. As other protesters stage silent die-ins, or calmly read prepared statements, Petrelis stood on the pew and screamed, "O'Connor, you're killing us! You're killing us, just stop it! Just stop it!" Before officers removed him from the cathedral, Petrelis screamed, "We will not be silent. We will fight O'Connor's bigotry."

Petrelis later faced criticism for his actions inside the cathedral. By standing on a pew, blowing a whistle, and screaming, while the other protesters inside the church participated in silent die-ins or read prepared statements, Petrelis had angered other protesters as well as outsiders and established his early reputation as one of ACT UP's more radical members.

== Years in Washington, D.C. ==
In January 1990, Petrelis moved to Washington, D.C., to "wreak havoc on what he saw as a complacent lesbian and gay community." Years later, Petrelis recalled a confrontation with Kramer at an ACT UP meeting in New York as prompting the move."Your obnoxiousness is not appreciated here," he remembered Kramer shouting. "Why don't you move to Washington, where your anger is more necessary?" There, Petrelis helped organize a local chapter of ACT UP, which began meeting in March 1990. With ACT UP/DC, Petrelis protested censorship of homoeroticism in the arts, pressured Amnesty International to recognize people imprisoned for sodomy to be counted as victims of human rights abuse, demanded an end to the United States' immigration restrictions against people with HIV, traveled to President George H. W. Bush's family compound in Kennebunkport, Maine, to disrupt the president's vacation, disrupted the National Conference of Catholic Bishops' press conference to protest Catholic Church's teachings on condom use, helped stuff condoms and AIDS awareness posters into hundreds of vending box copies of The Washington Post to criticize the newspaper's AIDS coverage, helped organize large demonstrations at the United States Capitol, and launched a nationwide boycott of the Philip Morris Co. (now Altria Group, Inc.), to protest the company's support for Jesse Helms, a Republican senator from North Carolina.

In June 1991, angered by what he considered unfair treatment of Greg Greeley, a captain in the United States Air Force, after Greeley marched in Washington D.C.'s gay pride parade on the last day of his commission, Petrelis helped organize Queer Nation/National Capital, a Washington, D.C. chapter of the militant direct action group. Petrelis used Queer Nation as a platform for outing closeted politicians and seeking justice for Allen R. Schindler, Jr., a sailor beaten to death in Japan because he was gay.

=== Philip Morris boycott ===
On April 20, 1990, Petrelis and other members of ACT UP/DC met with executives of the Philip Morris Co., makers of Marlboro cigarettes, to discuss the company's support for Jesse Helms, a Republican Senator from North Carolina. The activists told the executives that Helms' voting record on issues important to lesbian, gay men, and people with AIDS was entirely negative: he had "voted wrong every time." They left the meeting "agreeing to disagree." On the following Monday, Petrelis announced a nationwide boycott of Marlboro cigarettes. ACT UP/DC published a position paper explaining the reasons for the boycott. In June, ACT UP/ San Francisco announced an expansion of the boycott to include Miller beer, also manufactured by Philip Morris. The boycott drew support from advocates of the arts, unhappy with Helms' efforts to defund the National Endowment for the Arts (NEA). At the boycott's peak, ACT UP was conducting related activities in eighteen cities, with a toll-free boycotters' hotline and a rumor control team. At an August 13, 1990, press conference on the steps of the Philip Morris headquarters in midtown Manhattan, representatives of ACT UP/NY said the Miller beer boycott was being observed in more than thirty cities across the U.S. and in more than one hundred bars, clubs, restaurants, and theaters in New York City.

As the boycott expanded, Petrelis targeted Helms in other ways. On July 17, 1990, he was arrested with five other members of ACT UP/DC in Helms' office in the Dirksen Senate Office Building, after the demonstrators "shouted and chanted" and threatened to occupy the office until Helms resigned. A month later, the "Helms Office Six" pleaded guilty to the misdemeanor charge of protesting in a capitol building; in exchange for their plea, prosecutors dropped the more serious misdemeanor charge of unlawful entry that carried a penalty of up to one year in jail. The court sentenced the protesters to three days in jail, suspended, and six months probation. On August 14, 1990, Petrelis defended an ACT UP/DC poster campaign featuring an image of Helms sodomizing George H. W. Bush. ACT UP members wheat-pasted the poster in neighborhoods throughout the District of Columbia.

In August, the Conservative Campaign Fund of Washington, D.C. filed a complaint with the Federal Election Commission (FEC) naming Petrelis, ACT UP/DC, and other boycott organizers. The complaint charged the boycott organizers with interfering with the North Carolina Senate race in violation of federal election rules. In February 1991, the FEC announced it would pursue the case, and in 1993, the FEC pressured ACT UP to enter into a conciliation process to negotiate the civil fine the organization would pay. ACT UP determined to keep fighting. Citing the length of time that had passed and the fact that the ACT UP chapters named in the complaint no longer existed, FEC general council Larry Noble eventually recommended the commissioners drop the case.

That fall, Petrelis and other ACT UP members heckled Philip Morris Co. executives in some cities as they traveled the country with Virginia's original copy of the Bill of Rights, a Philip Morris sponsored tour celebrating the founding document's upcoming bicentennial. Petrelis credited this "public relations nightmare" with the company's willingness the following summer to settle the boycott.

On May 31, 1991, the Philip Morris Co. and ACT UP held a joint press conference announcing an end to the boycott, with the cigarette and beer maker condemning anti-gay discrimination, and promising to double its contributions to AIDS causes and create a new program to channel contributions to lesbian and gay groups. The company also specified that its campaign contributions to Helms were based on Helms' support of the tobacco industry alone and did not reflect agreement with his other positions. Petrelis called on gay and lesbian groups to accept the settlement. He said the boycott had sensitized the company about AIDS and anti-homosexual attitudes. The settlement, and Petrelis' role in the negotiations that led to it were controversial within ACT UP. Bill Haskell of ACT UP/San Francisco vowed the boycott would continue. William Dobbs of ACT UP/New York called the settlement "despicable," and equated accepting money from the company with "stepping over thousands of dead" to fight AIDS.

=== Outing campaigns ===
On May 26, 1990, Petrelis held a press conference with Carl Goodman on the west steps of the United States Capitol to read the names of eleven officials, including eight members of congress and one entertainment executive who, the activists claimed, were secretly homosexual. A number of reporters attended the press conference, and some wrote about it, but none published the names. Petrelis would later recall he had been "emboldened" to organize the press conference by an article in the San Francisco Examiner which attributed the prediction of a "national outing day" to writer Arthur Evans. One of the individuals Petrelis and Goodman named was Mark Hatfield, a Republican Senator from Oregon whom Petrelis had first helped expose as secretly homosexual in February 1989, part of the first political outing of an elected official by American activists.

In the aftermath of the outing of newly deceased multimillionaire Malcolm Forbes by the lesbian and gay news magazine, OutWeek, Petrelis said of the tactic, "Outing is a very complicated issue. There are no rules for outing. Politicians give up a lot of their privacy. Their lives are lived in a fishbowl."

Steve Gunderson, a Republican representing Wisconsin's 3rd congressional district in the United States House of Representatives, had been among those individuals Petrelis had included on his list of closeted homosexuals at the May 26, 1990, press conference on the steps of the United States Capitol. When Petrelis encountered Gunderson at a gay bar in Alexandria, Virginia, in late June 1991, Petrelis confronted Gunderson, urging him to come out and support gay rights. Specifically, Petrelis objected to Gunderson's vote against the Civil Rights Amendment Act of 1991, which would have extended the protections of the Civil Rights Act of 1964 to include sexual orientation. Gunderson reportedly replied, "I am out. I'm in this bar aren't I?", dismissing Petrelis. Petrelis grew angry and threw a beverage at his face. Petrelis then called the police on himself. Afterwards, Petrelis contacted journalists to promote the incident. After Petrelis and others made Gunderson's homosexuality public, Gunderson became more supportive of gay issues and more open about his own sexuality.

On June 28, 1991, Petrelis held a press conference attended by the Associated Press, Tribune Broadcasting, The Washington Post, and a local NBC affiliate to out Pete Williams, Assistant Secretary of Defense for Public Affairs. Williams had risen to prominence during the Gulf War, acting as a Pentagon spokesperson. His homosexuality was considered an open secret in some Washington circles. Petrelis' press release stated, "Pete Williams, an openly closeted gay man, hypocritically remains silent in his job as Pentagon spokesman, while the Department of Defense continues its irrational policy of ejecting thousands of gays and lesbians from the armed services." At the press conference, Petrelis unfurled a poster bearing an image of Williams that read: PETE WILLIAMS ABSOLUTELY QUEER: PENTAGON SPOKESPERSON, TAP DANCER, CONSUMMATE QUEER. No one reported the story, but Petrelis returned to the Pentagon on August 6, 1991, to intercept reporters as they entered the building for a regularly scheduled Tuesday morning briefing. Petrelis held an impromptu press conference. He carried with him a box of copies of an article by Michelangelo Signorile from the most recent issue of the Advocate, outing Williams. Petrelis scolded the reporters for ignoring the story and urged them to ask Williams directly about his homosexuality. A half hour into Williams' briefing that day, Rolf Paasch, a foreign correspondent with Berlin's Die Tageszeitung, asked Williams if he could confirm or deny the claims that he was gay, and whether or not he had discussed possible resignation with Secretary of Defense Dick Cheney. Williams responded by saying he was not paid to discuss his personal life and that "government people don't discuss in public whatever they may say to their bosses."

=== ACT UP Presidential Project ===
Petrelis temporarily relocated to a rented apartment in Manchester, New Hampshire at the beginning of December 1991, to organize what later became known as the ACT UP Presidential Project. The aim of the project was to pressure presidential candidates of all parties to address AIDS and other issues important to lesbian and gay voters.

Petrelis launched the effort in Concord, New Hampshire on December 10, 1991, when he disrupted conservative commentator Pat Buchanan's announcement of his candidacy for the Republican presidential nomination. Two minutes into Buchanan's speech, broadcast on the Cable-Satellite Public Affairs Network (C-SPAN), Petrelis started screaming, "Act up, fight back, fight AIDS!" Off camera, senior Buchanan campaign officials tackled Petrelis and dragged him from the hall, while Buchanan advised, "Be gentle. Be gentle with him." Standing over Petrelis outside, the campaign officials were heard to threaten, "Every time you come here, this is what you're going to get. Tell your friends." Petrelis filed an assault complaint with the New Hampshire State Police against the two campaign officials, Paul Nagy and Chris Tremblay.

Over the coming months, Petrelis led a small group of activists around the country, following the candidates to key primary states and successfully inserting the project's issues into the national debate. The project distributed condoms at campaign venues and offices, produced a thirty-second television ad, accusing the candidates of ignoring AIDS, that sparked controversy when WMUR-TV in Manchester, New Hampshire, refused to air it because the station objected to the images of same-sex couples kissing, challenged presidential hopeful Ross Perot's promise that his administration would not appoint homosexuals to cabinet posts, and encouraged lesbian and gay voters to be skeptical about then-candidate Bill Clinton. The pressure on Clinton resulted in sixteen AIDS-specific policy promises from the campaign. Ann Northrop, a New York City activist and journalist, later said of Petrelis' efforts, "Michael did a great job putting our issues on the agenda during the campaign."

=== Seeking justice for Allen Schindler ===
On December 17, 1992, Petrelis noticed a short item in The Washington Times about the October 27, 1992, beating death, in Sasebo, Japan, of Allen R. Schindler, Jr., a United States Navy seaman stationed aboard the USS Belleau Wood (LHA-3), who the newspaper said may have been gay. When Petrelis could find no other information, he said he grew suspicious. He believed the sailor's death was a consequence of the military's ban on homosexuals that Clinton had promised to repeal. He telephoned Schindler's mother, Dorothy Hajdys-Clausen, and told her his intentions to raise awareness about the crime for political reasons.

Petrelis vowed to turn Schindler into "the gay Rodney King." He organized a press conference and protest on the steps of the Pentagon that prompted coverage on local television stations that night. Activists claimed the protest also prompted the Navy to disclose previously concealed details of the crime. Petrelis believed the Navy was downplaying Schindler's homosexuality. Hajdys-Clausen complained that the Navy did not inform her until December 6, 1992, that her son had openly identified himself as homosexual a month before the murder. Over the next six months, Petrelis organized numerous press conferences at the Pentagon, the White House, and in Japan. Hajdys-Clausen said that, without the public attention, "the Navy would whitewash the whole thing". She feared the Navy was trying to cover up a hate crime. On January 18, 1993, Petrelis organized a candlelight vigil for Schindler, sponsored by Queer Nation/National Capital, at the United States Navy Memorial, with Hajdys-Clausen participating.

At a hearing on February 3, 1993, the Navy charged Airman Apprentice Terry M. Helvey of the USS Belleau Wood with Schindler's murder, based largely on the accounts of his shipmate and accomplice, Charles E. Vins, whom the Navy had tried quietly in November and sentenced to four months in prison, of which he served 78 days in exchange for his testimony against Helvey. Petrelis did not trust the Navy to fully prosecute Helvey. At the White House, Petrelis met with Bob Hattoy, the Clinton administration's liaison to the gay community, to discuss the Schindler case and ask for a special prosecutor. With the financial support of David Geffen, Charles Holmes, Larry Kramer, and Marvin Liebman, among others, Petrelis traveled twice to Japan to monitor the proceedings. There, he held press conferences, met with sailors who had been stationed with Schindler on the USS Belleau Wood, gained access to the U.S. naval base at Sasebo, Japan, where the USS Belleau Wood was docked, and obtained special permission to attend Helvey's court-martial proceedings at the U.S. naval base at Yokosuka, Japan.

To avoid the death penalty for premeditated murder, Helvey pleaded guilty to the lesser charge of "murder with intent to do great bodily harm." On May 27, 1993, the Navy sentenced him to life in prison. Petrelis said, "This sentence sends a message that it's not O.K. to kill gay sailors and that homophobic violence will be punished."

In 2015, Petrelis released to the public a 900-page Naval investigative report on Schindler that he had obtained through a Freedom of Information Act request after years of pressuring the Navy to divulge undisclosed information about the Schindler murder. Petrelis released the document on Veterans Day.

Petrelis appeared on an episode of the TV documentary crime series, The 1990s: The Deadliest Decade — "Don't Ask Don't Tell", season 1 episode 8, where he discussed his involvement in the Schindler case. The episode aired on Jan 7, 2019, on Investigation Discovery.

In early 2022, Petrelis, along with Schindler's family, strongly opposed Helvey's recommendation for parole, with a possible release date on October 26, 2022. "The brutal death of Allen Schindler for daring to live authentically as a gay member of the U.S. Navy before the ban on LGBT people was lifted, at the hands of Terry Helvey, who pleaded guilty to the murder, demands that for justice to be served he remain incarcerated," Petrelis said in a statement. "It would have been an outrage if the U.S. Parole Commission granted him release around the date 30-years ago when Schindler was killed out of hatred." Helvey was denied parole on March 7, 2022.

== Return to San Francisco ==
In 1995, Petrelis left Washington, DC, to return to San Francisco, California. There, he continued to speak out and take action on a wide range of issues: advocating rent control, protesting internet censorship, criticizing how the National Institutes of Health (NIH) conducted and publicized a study on the use of nonoxynol-9 among men who have sex with men, questioning the role of heterosexuals as leaders of lesbian and gay organizations, opposing the death penalty, even in cases of fatal hate crimes, criticizing Willie Brown, Mayor of San Francisco, for using a pejorative, "pantywaists," to insult United Airlines' airplanes, and supporting state-mandated name reporting for people with HIV. Petrelis was also credited as the architect of a campaign to out Jim Kolbe, a Republican congressman from Arizona, after Kolbe voted in favor of the Defense of Marriage Act (DOMA).

=== Female condoms for gay men ===
In early 1996, the San Francisco Department of Public Health (SFDPH) agreed to offer female condoms to men who have sex with men, as protection against HIV and other sexually transmitted infections during anal sex, after Petrelis urged them to do so by phone and letter. Petrelis criticized the agency for failing to hold public meetings about the female condom, and initially failing to provide adequate instructions for its use. Petrelis also worried that use of the female condom for anal sex had not been approved by the Food and Drug Administration (FDA). Because Petrelis had first lobbied for wider distribution of the female condom, then criticized how SFDPH accomplished that, an unnamed SFDPH staff member accused Petrelis of "a complete 180 back flip." Petrelis countered that he had consistently advocated for SFDPH to hold public hearings about its work.

=== Campaign to reopen the bathhouses ===
In 1997, Petrelis helped organize a campaign to reopen the bathhouses, after San Francisco Board of Supervisors member Tom Ammiano proposed an ordinance to license and regulate the city's sex clubs, thereby codifying previously voluntary guidelines. Petrelis opposed the measure as an unwarranted government intrusion into the sex lives of gay men. Among the voluntary guidelines to be codified by the legislation was a prohibition against locked doors, behind which patrons might engage in unprotected anal intercourse. San Francisco health officials considered the availability of such private spaces to be a distinguishing characteristic of the bathhouses the city had worked to close, and keep closed, since 1984. The debate over the proposed legislation led some activists to demand reopening the bathhouses. Petrelis said, "...I think that there are mature gay men who know how to make decisions behind closed doors." Ammiano's proposal failed for lack of support from San Francisco Mayor Willie Brown.

For the next two years, Petrelis and other activists lobbied SFDPH to reverse the prohibition against bathhouses with locking doors. In 1999, the activists authored a ballot initiative to overturn the ban on private rooms in gay sex clubs and eliminate the requirement that club staff monitor consensual behavior among club patrons. Mitchell Katz, director of SFDPH, strongly opposed the initiative before it even qualified for the ballot; the San Francisco Chronicle editorialized against it, citing "disturbing evidence of an upsurge in dangerous sex practices among some gays." Petrelis responded by demanding that critics reveal the evidence they claimed, while citing statistics showing decreased incidence of both male rectal gonorrhea and new AIDS cases in San Francisco. Activists collected only four thousand signatures of the more than ten thousand needed to qualify the measure for the ballot in November 1999.

=== AIDS Accountability Project ===
In 1997, Petrelis and other activists grew critical of the San Francisco AIDS Foundation (SFAF), a nonprofit AIDS service organization (ASO), and its executive director, Pat Christen. Petrelis said people with AIDS were going without needed assistance because SFAF was spending "too much on itself" and demanded that SFAF disclose the salaries of its executives. He encouraged activists in other cities to ask similar questions about how AIDS dollars were being spent where they live. When SFAF's informational tax return, or Form 990, revealed that Christen was paid more than $162,000 in 1995, Petrelis and other activists were infuriated. The activists' complaints about the lack of transparency at SFAF led Tom Ammiano, representing District 9 on the San Francisco Board of Supervisors, to propose a controversial disclosure law requiring a charity that receives city funds to open all its meetings to the public, make all its documents available to the public, and admit a city-appointed observer to its board of directors if deemed necessary by the Board of Supervisors. In June 1998, Willie Brown, Mayor of San Francisco, signed a compromise version of the ordinance, requiring charities that receive at least $250,000 in city grants to convene at least two public board meetings a year and provide some financial information to the public.

In 1998, Petrelis organized the AIDS Accountability Project, and created a web site to publish the informational tax returns of nonprofit ASO's. By April, the project had published the tax returns of twenty-eight such agencies located throughout the United States and highlighted the six-digit salaries of certain ASO executives.

After Petrelis expressed his concerns to Tom Coburn, a Republican representing Oklahoma's 2nd congressional district in the United States House of Representatives, Coburn made a floor speech accusing AIDS charity executives of "lining their own pockets." Coburn read into the Congressional Record an article from the San Francisco Examiner about Petrelis and the AIDS Accountability Project. AIDS groups criticized Petrelis for working with Coburn, a supporter of mandatory names reporting for people with HIV and AIDS. Petrelis responded that he had first expressed his concerns to Barbara Boxer, a Democrat representing California in the United States Senate, and Nancy Pelosi, a Democrat representing California's 12th congressional district in the United States House of Representatives. Boxer and Pelosi did not take an interest in Petrelis' cause. Petrelis asked, "...but where are the liberals?"

In December 1998, the Family Research Council called on the 106th Congress to conduct a "full audit of all federal AIDS dollars" before reauthorizing the Ryan White Care Act, the legislation through which AIDS dollars were appropriated; Petrelis lamented, "What has the world come to when strident AIDS activists find their calls for accountability from AIDS charities are echoed by the Family Research Council?" In April 1999, Coburn formally requested that the Government Accounting Office (GAO) conduct a performance audit and evaluation of all federal HIV programs and services. Joining him in the request were House Majority Leader Dick Armey, a Republican representing Texas's 26th congressional district in the United States House of Representatives, and Commerce Committee Chairman Thomas Bliley, a Republican representing Virginia's 7th congressional district in the United States House of Representatives.

The GAO published the requested report in March 2000, concluding that federal AIDS programs were administered well and were effective, portending the reauthorization of the Ryan White CARE ACT. The report said that compensation for the executives of nonprofit ASO's receiving federal assistance was "generally comparable to that of similar nonprofit organizations." Based on the report, Coburn concluded that more federal funding needed to be directed towards prevention efforts.

Months later, a San Francisco Department of Public Health (SFDPH) report showing increased HIV transmission rates in San Francisco led Petrelis to question how local organizations were using the more than sixteen million dollars being spent annually for HIV prevention efforts. He also publicly accused two local HIV prevention professionals of hypocrisy for advocating condom use while posting personal profiles on a website for men seeking unprotected sex with other men. Petrelis demanded greater accountability at the Centers for Disease Control (CDC) as well; he believed federal funds budgeted for HIV prevention should only be spent on the prevention programs themselves and not to reimburse prevention professionals for travel and lodging related to attending conferences. Petrelis said such expenditures exemplified the "AIDS gravy train." In April 2001, he credited Paul Kawata, executive director of the National Minority AIDS Council (NMAC), for postponing indefinitely a Minority Executives Retreat originally planned to take place in Oahu, Hawaii.

In 2001, Petrelis contacted Mark Souder, a Republican representing Indiana's 3rd congressional district in the United States House of Representatives and chairing the subcommittee of the House Committee on Government Oversight and Reform that oversaw public health programs, and complained about the ineffectiveness and sexually explicit nature of federally funded HIV prevention programs being administered by the Stop AIDS Project in San Francisco. Petrelis said he had tried first to pressure both the SFDPH and the CDC to scrutinize the programs, without results. Souder requested that Janet Rhenquist, Inspector General of the United States Department of Health and Human Services conduct an investigation into the programs. In a report released October 12, 2001, Rhenquist concluded the programs could be construed as directly encouraging sexual activity and as obscene, both violations of the guidelines for such programs receiving federal funds. As a result of the findings, Rhenquist said she would expand her investigation into all CDC-funded AIDS-prevention programs.

The AIDS Accountability Project also questioned the activities of the Elton John AIDS Foundation after the foundation refused to release its informational tax returns (IRS Forms 990). Petrelis said that of the sixty organizations from which the project had requested the returns, only the Elton John AIDS Foundation had refused to release the information.

=== Criminal charges and arrest ===
Following an October 23, 2000, demonstration in the client service area of the San Francisco AIDS Foundation (SFAF) offices, the San Francisco County Superior Court named Petrelis, David Pasquarelli of ACT UP/San Francisco, and four others in an injunction against ACT UP/San Francisco, barring the activists from within one hundred feet of five SFAF employees and their workplace for three years. Petrelis was not a member of ACT UP/San Francisco.

On November 12, 2001, a temporary restraining order barred Petrelis and Paquarelli from contacting or coming within three hundred feet of any employees of the San Francisco Chronicle or the newspaper's offices. The order alleged that Petrelis and Pasquarelli made dozens of obscene and threatening calls to editors and reporters at home and at work. The newspaper's lawyers said the activists appeared to be angry about two stories published in the newspaper, one about an increase in unsafe sex practices among gay men in San Francisco, another about SFDPH statistics showing rising rates of syphilis among gay men in San Francisco.

On November 28, 2001, Petrelis and Pasquarelli appeared before the San Francisco County Superior Court for a hearing on civil harassment suits by two public health officials, and five San Francisco Chronicle editors and reporters who claimed they received threatening phone calls. In the courthouse hallway after the hearing, San Francisco Police Department officers arrested Petrelis and Pasquarelli. The activists were charged with criminal conspiracy, stalking, and making terrorist threats against newspaper reporters and public health officials. Petrelis' bail was set at $500,000; Pasquarelli's bail was set at $600,000. On November 30, 2001, a judge refused the arrestees' request for a reduction in the unusually high bail. Mark Vermeulen, the attorney representing Petrelis and Pasquarelli, said the activists were abiding by the restraining orders, the matter was being handled by the civil courts, and that there was no need for criminal prosecution. The twenty-seven counts of criminal conspiracy, stalking, and making terrorist threats carried a possible penalty of up to seventy-eight years in prison.

Petrelis and Pasquarelli admitted they made late-night phone calls but denied making threats. They said they had been angered by an article reporting what they believed to be concocted SFDPH statistics showing rising rates of syphilis among gay men in San Francisco. The activists also admitted making similar phone calls to Jeffrey Klausner, the public health official from whose office at SFDPH the syphilis statistics had originated and one of the complainants in the criminal proceedings. Klausner had also angered the activists by speculating in a Washington Monthly magazine article about possibly quarantining HIV-positive men who refused to practice protected sex. Klausner said his remarks were taken out of context. The author of the article wrote a clarification denying that Klausner or the SFDPH advocated such an approach.

Hundreds of people, including AIDS activists and cultural icons, signed an open letter written by William K. Dobbs, a New York-based activist and civil liberties lawyer, demanding bail reduction and opposing the severe charges, although some activists said Petrelis and Pasquarelli belonged in jail. A researcher at the University of California at San Francisco requested the Federal Bureau of Investigation (FBI) investigate Petrelis and Pasquarelli under the domestic terrorism provisions of the USA PATRIOT Act. The FBI declined to pursue the request.

While in custody, Petrelis complained of inadequate medical attention. He suffered from an esophageal candidiasis infection (thrush) and a serious skin condition affecting sixty percent of his body. On December 8, 2001, a judge ordered Petrelis rushed to the prison medical unit for treatment.

In February 2002, Judge Perker Meeks of the San Francisco County Superior Court said he found sufficient evidence that Petrelis and Pasquarelli had made threats intended to cause fear and ordered the activists to stand trial. Petrelis and Pasquarelli had spent seventy-three days in jail when their supporters posted a reduced, combined bail of $220,000, and the activists were released to await trial.

Nearly a year and a half later, the activists pleaded no contest to misdemeanor charges of making threatening phone calls to public health officials and reporters at the San Francisco Chronicle. The court sentenced Petrelis and Pasquarelli to one year in jail, suspended to three years probation, and ordered the activists to attend anger management training, stay away from the officials and reporters for three years, and issue written apologies to their victims. Under the agreement, Petrelis was allowed to send the San Francisco Chronicle one letter or fax per day on matters of public interest.

=== Opposing Scott Wiener ===
In 2012, Petrelis opposed legislation to ban public nudity proposed by Scott Wiener, a Democrat representing District 8 on the San Francisco Board of Supervisors. Petrelis also clashed with Wiener over other issues. In November 2012, Petrelis was arrested for taking a photograph of Wiener in a public restroom in San Francisco City Hall without Wiener's permission. Petrelis pleaded no contest to a misdemeanor disorderly conduct charge and received three years probation. The judge also issued a complicated stay-away order restricting Petrelis from being within one hundred and fifty feet of Wiener, as well as other provisions, including exceptions that permit Petrelis to attend certain public meetings.

In March 2013, Petrelis announced his candidacy for the District 8 supervisor seat held by Wiener. Petrelis said he was running to give voters a way to "protest against Castro gentrification and development greed." He received less than 7% of votes cast.
