= Edwige Belmore =

French singer, model and actor

Edwige
- Edwige
- Born: Edwige Belmor; February 26, 1956; Villejuif, Paris
- Died: September 22, 2015 (aged 59); Miami, Florida, U.S.
- Notable work: Singer with Mathématiques Modernes: Jacno – Disco Rough / Rectangle (1980), Paris Tokyo (1981), Les Visiteurs Du Soir (1981)
- Movement: punk fashion synth pop no wave

Edwige, also known as Edwige Belmore and Edwige Braun-Belmore and la reine du punk a Paris (February 26, 1957 – September 22, 2015) was a French model, singer, artist and actress. She was considered a blonde icon of 1980s No Wave New York/France connection after she appeared on the cover of Façade magazine (No. 4) kissing Andy Warhol on the cheek. The magazine cover text read: "The Queen of Punk and the Pope of Pop".

Edwige founded (with Claude Arto) the post-punk synth pop musical group Mathématiques modernes with which she sang, and released four albums. She was for a time the doorman/bouncer/promoter of the club Le Palace. In New York she promoted nights at Area, Danceteria, Tunnel, and The Palladium Niteclub. She was photographed by famous photographers of the day like Helmut Newton, Maripol, Jean-Baptiste Mondino and Pierre et Gilles who photographed her as Sainte Gertrude the Great. She walked the runway for Jean-Paul Gaultier and Thierry Mugler. Throughout the 80s, Edwige went back and forth from New York City and Paris, where she sang at Les Bains-Douches.

== Biography ==
Edwige Bessuand was born on February 26, 1957 in Paris, and was taken into state care after being abandoned. As a teenager, she lived in the Kremlin-Bicêtre. Her adoptive parents separated and kicked her out of the house when she was 17.

Edwige went to live with Maud Molyneux and Paquita Paquin, on the rue Vavin in Montparnasse, where she gradually turned into a punk rocker, shaving her hair and dyeing it platinum blond when it grew back. She spent her nights at Le Sept with Molyneux and Paquin, at Le Bains Douches where she sometimes performed on stage or at La Main Bleue with Paquita and Eva Ionesco.

In 1979, Edwige founded (with Claude Arto) the post-punk synth pop musical group Mathématiques modernes with which she sang and released four albums. She was for a time the doorman/bouncer/promoter of the club Le Palace.

Edwige met and befriended Paloma Picasso, who introduced her to the world of Andy Warhol and the jet-set. She became friends with Yves Saint Laurent and Loulou de la Falaise. She went to New York for the first time at the end of 1977 and attended the Mudd Club and Studio 54. She returned regularly to New York over the following years, living on Ludlow Street on the Lower East Side of Manhattan, where she developed a heroin habit.

Edwige modeled for Jean-Paul Gaultier and Thierry Mugler. She was photographed in 1990 by Pierre and Gilles for a work entitled Sainte Gertrude la Grande. "The strong temperament of our model and her boyish appearance went well with the reputation for rigor and austerity of this intellectual and mystical figure that was Gertrude the Great", explains the photographers. During her career, she was photographed several times by Pierre and Gilles, both for the press and for advertising. Long before, she was also the subject of photographs by Helmut Newton for a rarely published photo, Maripol a few years later, and Jean-Baptiste Mondino.

In 1987, Edwige went to an ashram in India for several years to learn and teach yoga. From there she moved to Miami, where she lived at the Vagabond Hotel.

In 2012, Edwige appeared in a documentary by Jérôme de Missolz, Des jeunes gens mödernes. In the film, a group of young artists, fascinated by the punk style, meet a music critic from the period.

At the estimated age of 58, Edwige died of untreated chronic hepatitis on September 22, 2015 at a hospital in Florida.

== Discography with Mathématiques Modernes ==
- Jacno – Disco Rough / Rectangle (1980)
- Paris Tokyo (1981)
- Les Visiteurs Du Soir (1981)

== Films ==
Year	Title	Role	Notes
1975	L'héroïne de l'enfance		
1979	Dirty Dreamer Wanda	Edwige Gruss	
1978	The Secret Son	The prostitute	
1980	Scopitone (Short)	La chef de gang	
1981	La marque du destin		
1982	Chassé-croisé	Le professeur de piano	
1985	The Way It Is	Rebecca/Aglaonice	
1988	Deux ombres (Short)	La mère de Paul	
1988	Because the Dawn (Short)	Marie	
2016	The Incomparable Rose Hartman	(Documentary)	
2014	The Starck Club	(Documentary)	
2011	Kids of Töday	(as Edwige Belmore)	
2004	Rose Palace	(Documentary)	
