= Dyke TV =

Lesbian television program

- Genre: Lesbian, LGBTQ
- Created by: Ana María Simo
- Presented by: Ana María Simo
- Country of origin: United States
- Original language: English

Original release
- Network: Gay Cable Network
- Release: June 8, 1993 – 2005

Dyke TV was founded and created by Ana María Simo, playwright and cofounder of Lesbian Avengers; Linda Chapman, theater director and producer; and Mary Patierno, independent film and video maker.

The first episode aired on June 8, 1993, in New York City. The last episode aired in 2005. Dyke TV produced national documentary television programming. New episodes were produced weekly for the shows 12 years on air, and ran for a half hour. In January 2005, the last five episodes ran for an hour. It was broadcast on nationwide cable TV weekly from 1993 to 2005, reaching over 6.5 million households nationwide, as well as being screened at national and international film festivals. In 1994, Dyke TV was awarded a Hometown Video Festival Award.

== Viewership ==
Early on, Dyke TV was broadcast only through public access television in New York, but had the goal of creating a strong national network. Within the first year they worked to reach that goal and expanded by the week, reaching 15 cities by 1994. At its height, the show was accessible in 61 cities across the United States, including being picked up by PBS in Denver, which significantly increased accessibility in the area. Dyke TV also sold tapes, including quarterly subscriptions or best of compilations, giving out of network fans the opportunity to watch the show.

== Importance of Dyke TV ==
Dyke TV was created with the intention to provide empowerment for lesbians and increase visibility of lesbian issues, culture and community. Their mission, and their motto was to "Incite, Subvert, Provoke and Organize." Each episode began with news coverage of lesbian-related issues. Then, the episode covered diverse aspects of different lesbian communities, including art, health, politics, music, sports, etc. Those featured in the episodes came from diverse racial and socioeconomic backgrounds, highlighting intersectional issues within the lesbian community.

The decade of the 1990s was a pivotal time for the LGBT community, with the rise of HIV/AIDS and the rise of ACT UP, the Riot grrrl Movement and Queercore, the murder of Brandon Teena, and pro and anti LGBTQ+ legislation across the country, including Oregon Ballot Measure 9 (1992). Many of these issues were not discussed widely in mainstream news. Of the LGBTQ+ news that was discussed, the issues of cisgender gay men were highlighted, leaving behind much of the Queer community. Founder Linda Chapman remarked, co-founder Ana Simo "was looking for a better way to promote Lesbian Avengers and this seemed really ideal.” solidifying Dyke TV's position as fundamentally activism oriented. Thus, Dyke TV was pivotal in highlighting often-unseen LGBTQ+ issues and news, particularly within the lesbian community.

== Participation ==
Dyke TV was almost entirely run by volunteers, with only three paid staff members. Everything from networking and fundraising to production and distribution was volunteer based. Episodes were filmed, hosted and produced in New York City at the Dyke TV studio, but most segments were sent in from volunteer stringers and correspondents from across the country.

== Segments ==
Dyke TV ran for 322 episodes. Information about each segment can be found in the collection guide for the records at the Sophia Smith Collection at Smith College.

=== News ===
Coverage ranged from international issues like the war in Bosnia and Herzegovina to domestic LGBTQ issues, particularly those that affected lesbians including the political debates around gay marriage and Don't Ask Don't Tell. In line with the show's activist sensibilities, Dyke TV strove to report underrepresented cases of violence against lesbians, gay men and transgender people. This included the firebombing of AIDS activist Dee Deberry's home in Tampa to the murder of Hattie Mae Cohens and Brian Mock in Salem, Oregon. Documenting the activism of the radical queer organizations was a central goal of the show. The direct action tactics of the Lesbian Avengers were covered weekly on the news.

=== Arts ===
The Arts showcased lesbian work in the art world through interviews of artists or reporting on festivals and events. The segment ran new features weekly and was hosted by poet and performance artist Pamela Sneed. Notable features include filmmaker Cheryl Dunye, actress and performance artist Carmelita Tropicana, singer Ani Difranco and musician Toshi Reagon.

=== I Was a Lesbian Child ===
The popular segment “I was a lesbian child” featured the childhood photos and home videos of viewers and contributors. Those featured provided humorous voice-overs narrating their childhoods and emphasizing that they had always been gay. The name of the segment came from a 1992 Lesbian Avengers campaign to push for the gay and lesbian inclusive “Rainbow Curriculum” in New York City public schools, where they wore T-shirts proclaiming “I was a lesbian child.”

Episode Number	Air Date	Issues Discussed
1	June 8, 1993	Board of Education, Dyke March, Brooklyn Women's Martial Arts, Lesbian Visibility, Self Help, New Festival, Joan Jubela (Artist)
2	June 15, 1993	Military, Dee Deberry, ILGA Update, Civil Rights Bill, Queens Pride, Washington March, Lesbian Avenger, Cheryl Dunye (Artist), Janine (Artist)
3	June 22, 1993	Tampa, Dyke March, Puerto Rican Pride Parade, Military, Rugby, Community Health Project, Carmelita (Artist)
4	June 29, 1993	Dyke Pride March (NYC), Center Garden Party, Lesbian Herstory Archives Reopening, L&G Association Conference, Brave Smiles (Artist), Stick Figures (Artist), Lack of Leadership
5	July 6, 1993	Military, Dyke March, Angelo Esposito Conviction/Sentencing, NYC Lesbian & Gay Pride, Domestic Partnership, L&G Rodeo, Nicole Eisenman (Artist), Rove (artist)
