= Le Palace =

Theatre and night-club in Paris, France

Coordinates: 48°52′19″N 2°20′36″E

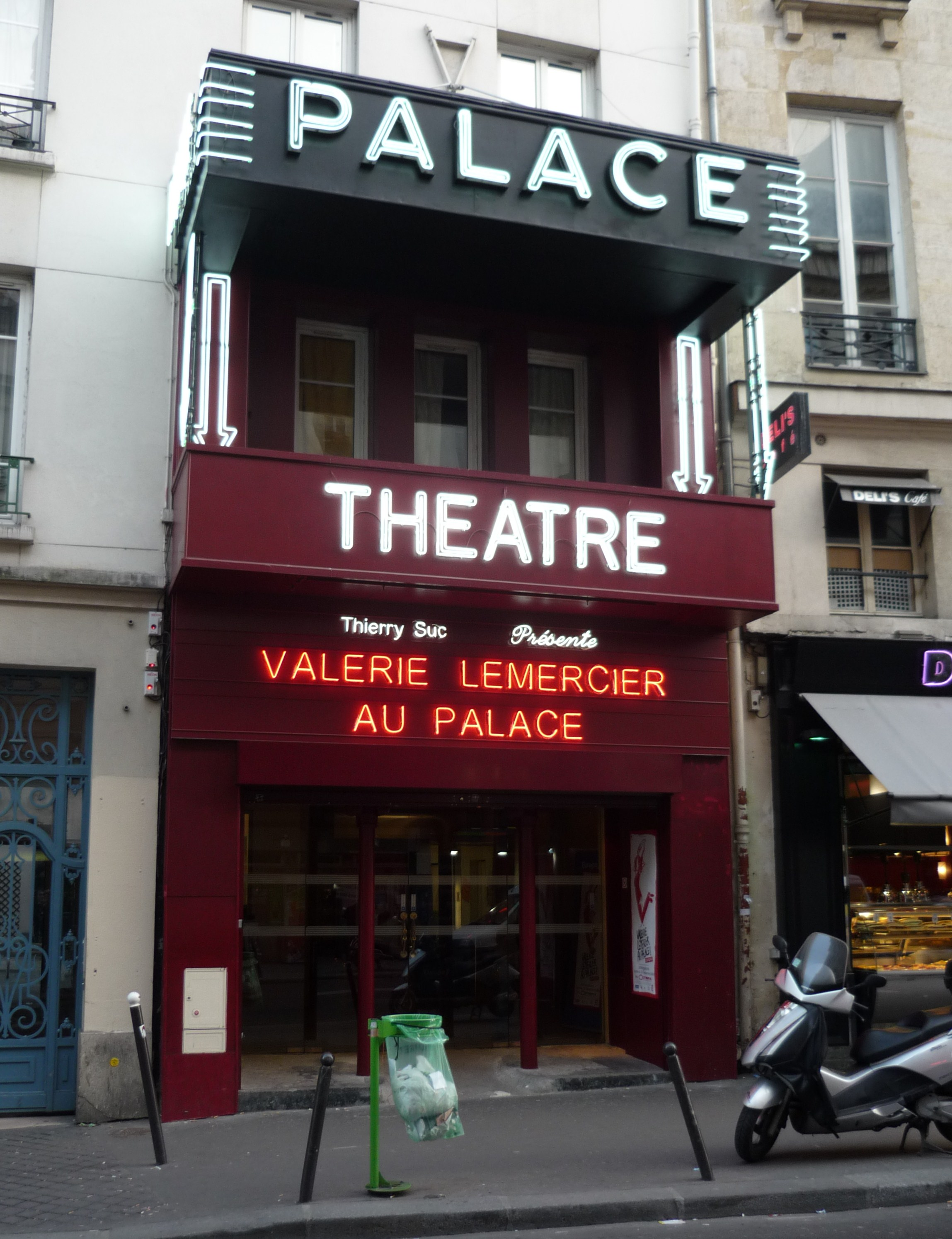
Le Palace in 2009

Le Palace is a Paris theatre located at 8, Rue du Faubourg-Montmartre in the 9th arrondissement. It is best known for its years as a nightclub.

Created by impresario Fabrice Emaer (1935–1983) in 1978, intellectuals, actors, designers, artists, models and American and European jetsetters patronized the club for its flamboyant DJ Guy Cuevas, extravagant theme parties and performances, and Emaer's rule-breaking mix of club-goers that threw together rich and poor, gay and straight, black and white.

After Emaer's death in 1983 Le Palace changed hands and names several times before reopening in 2008 as a theater and concert space of the same name.

== History: The Palace Theater ==
Constructed in the 17th century, the building on rue on Faubourg Montmartre already had a modern history as theater and dance hall before Fabrice Emaer turned it into one of the hottest nightclubs in Paris.

Baptized Le Palace as early as 1912, by 1923 it served as a music hall hosted by Oscar Dufrenne and Henri Varna who had already directed le Concert Mayol, Théâtre de l'Empire, le Moncey Music-Hall and the Théâtre des Bouffes du Nord. The two changed the name to Eden en Palace in 1923, and in collaboration with the Palace Theatre in London, had a long run engaging artists like dancer and singer Harry Pilcer and musical clown Grock.

In 1931, Oscar Dufrenne took the bold step of changing the theater into a cinema, a move which came to an end when his nude corpse was discovered on site in 1933, inspiring rumors of rough trade gone bad. Shortly afterwards, his partner Henry Varna changed the space back into a music hall which he called the Alcazar. It became a cinema again in 1946, recovering its original name and gradually fading from view.

The decrepit building was finally acquired by writer and theater director Pierre Laville in 1975. He began producing experimental theater there, and came to the attention of then Minister of Culture, Michel Guy, who used the space for his Festival d'Automne (Autumn Festival).

When impresario Fabrice Emaer decided to open a place large enough to rival Studio 54 in New York, it was Michel Guy who suggested he buy Le Palace.

== Trial runs: Le Pimm's, Le Sept ==
Fabrice Emaer was already a proven success when he opened Le Palace. He had already opened in Paris Le Pimm's, the premier gay club on Rue Sainte-Anne in 1964.

In 1968 he created Le Sept down the block. At the Le Sept club, he was trying to do something different from the gay pick-up scene at Le Pimm's. The "7" had a restaurant on the ground floor with a small dance floor in the basement simply decorated with mirrors on the walls and a ceiling with multicolored lights that flashed with the music. The focus here was dancing and the Sept quickly became "the epicenter of disco" in part because Emaer hired a young Cuban DJ Guy Cuevas, to work the turntable. Cuevas was largely responsible for introducing Paris to Disco and Funk music and the Soul music of The O'Jays, Billy Paul, Teddy Pendergrass and Marvin Gaye, among many more.

While some attributed Emaer's success with Le Sept largely to Cuevas, who had the crowd pressing at its doors and packing the dance floor, Emaer also accomplished something new with the clientele. Besides mixing food and drinks with dance, he mixed the "jet set" crowd with kids that just wanted to dance with artists and intellectuals and with anyone who had an interesting look of fashion. The combination of excellent music and a mixed clientele worked.

After a visit to New York City's Studio 54, Emaer returned with even greater ambitions to create a space that was more than a club, but a cultural experience.

== Emaer's Palace ==
Delighted with the Palace's decrepit structure which would allow him not just an enormous disco, but the accoutrements of a traditional theater space with stages and an enormous balcony, Fabrice Emaer ordered extensive construction work, restoring the architecturally classified building, including the style of the 1930s. The colossal expenses placed a financial burden on the future of the club, but in the short term the results were impressive as every detail was calculated. The decoration of the place was entrusted to painter Gérard Garouste and the creation of the furniture was done by Elisabeth Garouste. To complete the dramatic experience at the club, the Palace, not content with one laser show laser, had three, along with descending disco balls. Immersive installations by some of the time's most extravagant sculptors and stage designers like Yacov Agam, Carlos Cruz-Diez, Jesús Rafael Soto, Gregorio Vardanega and Nicolas Schöffer were installed for special occasions. There were different lighting effects every night that were so spectacular dancers would stop mid-gesture to watch what was going on.

The careful Rococo interior design extended to the waiters who were dressed in flamboyant red and gold costumes designed by the couturier Thierry Mugler. And on opening night of March 1st, 1978, the Palace set the tone for the future by offering an extravagant spectacle in which Grace Jones sang "La Vie en Rose" surrounded by dry ice effects and shining red roses while perched atop a pink Harley Davidson.

Emaer was very careful about the new wave, disco, and no wave punk music played there, such as Iggy Pop, Heldon (both Iggy Pop and Heldon have released on LP live concerts from Le Palace), Les Rita Mitsouko, Tuxedomoon, Electric Calls, Étienne Daho, Clair Obscur, Boy George, Françoise Hardy, Amanda Lear , Devo and Lucrate Milk. The LP Enregistrement public au Théâtre Le Palace is the first live album ever released by Serge Gainsbourg in 1980. Le Palace was quoted by The Clash in their song "Ivan meets GI Joe" from their 1980 album Sandinista! and a video was shot of one of their shows there. A young David Guetta sometimes DJed there. Emaer was also very picky about the door entry selection which was at first surveyed by physiognomists Paquita Paquin, Jenny Bel’Air and Edwige Belmore. They allowed in a select but diverse mixture of people: straight and gay, young and chic, old and rich. Among the regular famous visitors (to name just a few) were singer/song writer Serge Gainsbourg, Socialist Party politician Jack Lang, Alain Pacadis, of the newspaper Libération who frequently evoked le Palace and its regulars in his chronicles; philosopher Michel Foucault, semiotician Roland Barthes; singer Mick Jagger; artists Erró, Jean-Jacques Lebel and Andy Warhol; journalist Frédéric Mitterrand; director Roger Vadim; decorator Andrée Putman; movie producer and illustrator Jean-Paul Goude; art critics Pierre Restany and Catherine Millet, model and singer Grace Jones; couturiers Karl Lagerfeld, Kenzo, Claude Montana, Jean-Paul Gaultier, Sonia Rykiel, Paco Rabanne, and Yves Saint Laurent; model Iman, the CEO of Yves Saint Laurent and friend of François Mitterrand, Pierre Bergé; impersonator Thierry Le Luron; art gallerist Cyril Putman; actresses Jeanne Moreau, Alice Sapritch and Brigitte Bardot; and Figuration Libre/Bad Painting/Neo-expressionist painters Robert Combas, François Boisrond, Hervé Di Rosa and Remi Blanchard. On October 25, 1978, Karl Lagerfeld organized a Venice-themed costume ball he called From the City of the Doges to the City of the Gods which would enter the annals of Parisian nightlife history. Thousands of people attended dressed in ornate 18th century costumes.

== After Emaer ==
Fabrice Emaer died of cancer in 1983. Le Palace of the years 1983 to 1989 gave birth to the Parisian infatuation with House Music with the parties of Jean-Claude Lacreze and La Nicole (Nicolas) and especially the Pyramid Parties of 1987 organized by S-Express. Australian artist Leigh Bowery was frequently invited there. On July 15, 1987, Leigh Bowery brought in the British band You You You to perform. Le Palace also hosted Gay Tea Dances on Sunday afternoons.

In 1992 the so-called Queen of the Parisian Night, Régine, a former "rival" of Fabrice Emaer, took over the site. In 1994 the couple David and Cathy Guetta, with le Privilège, tried to relaunch it; renovating it (Garouste's decorations disappeared) and renaming it the Kitkat. Two years later, the place closed (in 1996) and was soon occupied by squatters for several years. Then in 2007, Alil and Hazis Vardar, Belgium brothers of Albanian origin, purchased the hall with the money of Francis and Chantal Lemaire, the proprietors of Radio Contact in Belgium. The Vardar brothers already owned Comédie République and Grande Comédie, Parisian comedy clubs. After its 2007 remodeling, they reopened Le Palace (now with 970 seats) to present comedy, one-man musical shows, and television broadcasts.

== Legacy ==
A number of live music concert performed at Le Palace have been released, including Pandit Pran Nath's Raga Cycle: Palace Theatre (1972), Soft Machine's Alive And Well Recorded in Paris (1978), The Gun Club's Le Palace Paris 1982 (1982), Richard Pinhas's L'Ethique (1992), Jane Birkin's Au Palace (2009), Prince's disk 3 Live at Le Palace, Paris, France, June 4, 1981 on the Prince And Dirty Mind Tours 1979–1981 CD package (2010), and Tim Blake's Crystal Machine (2017). In 2023, Guy Cuevas released a double vinyl LP called Le Palace Club Paris, mixing disco, funk, soul music, new wave, reggae, jazz-funk, ska, post-punk, mambo, African popular music, synth-pop, and glam rock. Also in 2023, the electropop group Parcels released two recordings made live at Le Palace: Reflex: from Le Palace, Paris and Live Vol. 2.

== See also ==
- Le Bains Douches
- LGBT culture in Paris
- List of electronic dance music venues

== Bibliography ==
- Roland Barthes, Au Palace ce soir, written for Vogues Hommes in 1978, reprinted in Incidents, by Seuil.
- Daniel Garcia, Les années Palace, by Flammarion.
- Jean Rouzaud and Guy Marineau, Le Palace: Remember, by Hoebeke.
