= Fabrice Emaer =

French nightlife impresario

Fabrice Emaer (1935–1983) called "The Prince of the night" was an impresario whose nightclubs le Sept, Le Bronx and le Palace, were the premier spots in Paris nightlife in the 1970s and early 1980s, celebrated in memoirs and songs like Amanda Lear's 1979 song "Fashion Pack" which declared, "In Paris you got to be seen at Maxim's / The Palace / The 7 and then go Chez Regine."

== Early life ==
Born on 1 May 1935, Francis Paul Emaer grew up in Wattrelos near Lille in northern France. His father was a traveling salesman for the local spinning mills, and his untimely death left the family impoverished.

At seventeen, he left his family and traveled North Africa and the French Riviera, before settling in Paris. By then, he had changed his name to the more elegant Fabrice, and worked as a stylist and make-up artist.

He opened his first club, "Le Pimm's Bar," in 1964. Le Pimm's evolved into the premier gay club on Saint-Anne Street, situated in the heart of the gay neighborhood near L'Opera that was packed with bars, bathhouses, and prostitutes. The clientele was almost exclusively gay men who were there to cruise.

== Prince of the Night ==
He had different ideas in 1968 when he took over another place down the block at 7, Saint-Anne Street. The Sept (7) had a restaurant on the ground floor with a small dance floor in the basement which he decorated simply, with mirrors on the walls and a ceiling with multicolored lights that flashed with the music.

"...the greatest innovation of Le Sept was that it was defined by glamour, not homosexuality. Everyone came -- gay, straight, and the undecided. 'You didn't have to be rich, you didn't have to be famous,' says former Le Sept DJ Guy Cuevas, 'you had to be beautiful.'"

Emaer himself fitted the bill. He was handsome and charming. When Guy Cuevas took over at the turntables, the Sept became the "epicenter of disco", attracting all of Paris. Visitors might see Francis Bacon, Nureyev, Roland Barthes, Bianca and Mick Jagger, Andy Warhol, Karl Lagerfeld, Yves Saint Laurent and Kenzo.

And after a visit to New York in 1977, Emaer returned with even greater ambitions—to create the Parisian answer to Studio 54 which he found impressive and repulsive at the same time. "It is completely sterilized, a ghetto for model agencies and Régine's emirs...." He sneered at the clientele which was "totally clean, beautiful, they look like they are fed on best quality corn."

== The Palace years ==
Following the recommendation of then culture minister Michel Guy, Emaer chose as his address the decrepit Palace Theater on rue Faubourg Montmartre which would allow him not just a huge disco, but the accoutrements of a traditional theater space with stages and an enormous balcony. He restored the architecturally classified building, including the decor of the '30s, hired a huge team of party organizers and press people to promote the club, and brought Guy Cuevas as DJ from the Sept.

The opening night, 1 May 1978, was packed. Clubgoers loved the music and Emaer's ability to create a compelling crowd. At the entry, Emaer instructed Edwige and Paquita Paquin to choose an interesting mix of rich and poor, gay and straight, black and white, the bourgeois, even punk. Above all they looked for attitude and an interesting look.

The jet set followed Emaer from the Sept, along with thousands of others from Alain Pacadis of the newspaper Libération who frequently evoked le Palace and its regulars in his chronicles to young journalist Frédéric Mitterrand, an unknown Madonna, and the famous Paloma Picasso whose wedding celebration eventually became a Palace event.

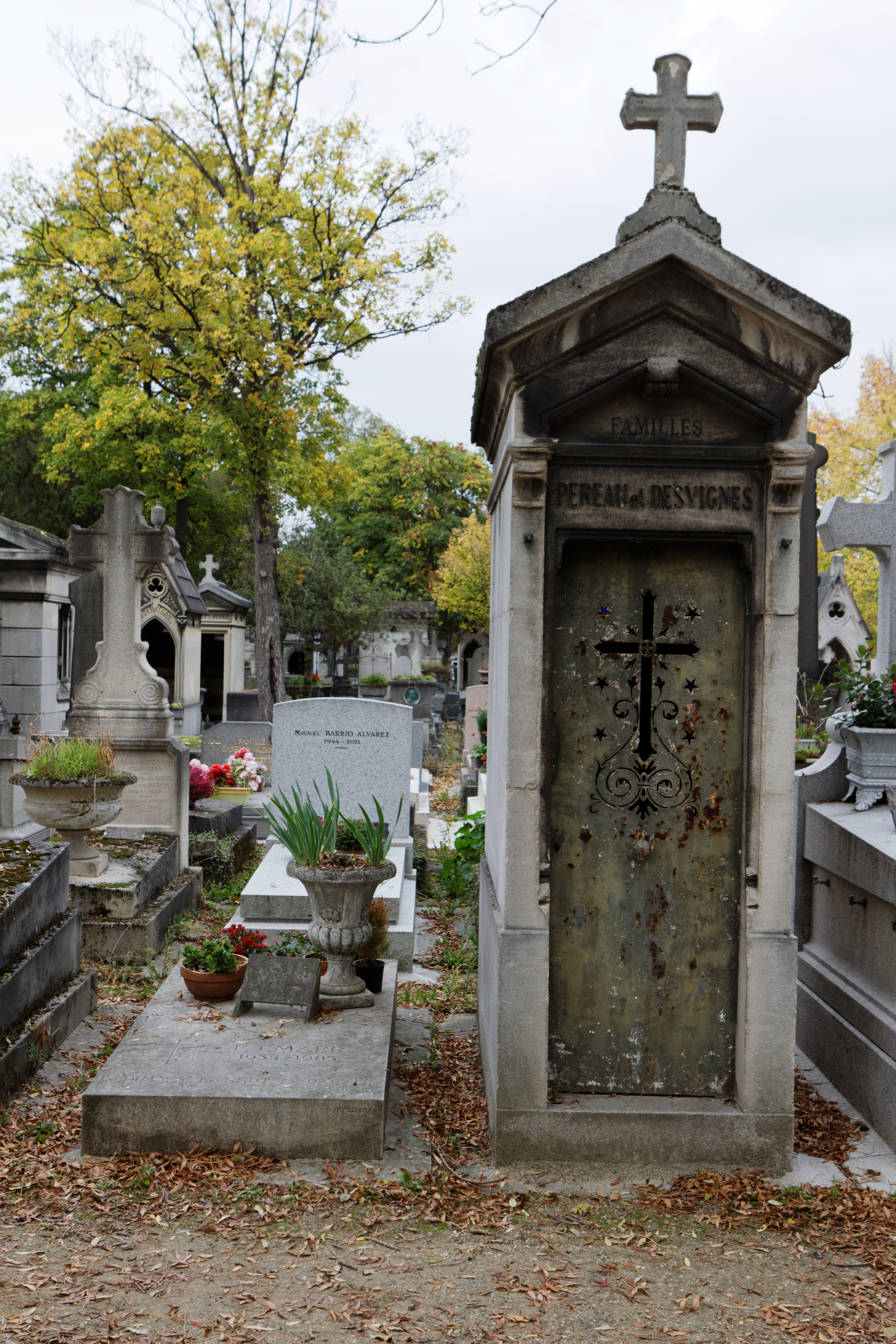
Emaer's grave (left)

Emaer's only misstep came in 1981 when he broke the taboo against meddling in French politics, and one night asked the crowd to vote for François Mitterrand, who would become the first French President of the left in decades.

Emaer had never hidden his political leanings. He was openly gay and at some point even described himself as a "homosexual militant" whose commercial activities helped to build a sense of community among French homosexuals. He offered a Sunday "Tea Dance" free for gay men, and used the theater's giant screen to call attention to Argentina's disappeared.

But Paquita Paquin in her memoir, "Twenty Years Without Sleeping", remembered that his direct call to vote for Mitterrand left many of the clubgoers appalled. A large number returned their membership cards to "Privilege" the VIP lounge at the Palace.

That paired with the fading of disco, began to empty the club. By the time Emaer died of cancer two years later in 1983, Le Palace was struggling to fill its enormous dance floors.

== Epitaph ==
Shortly before his death, Emaer commented, "I think that I have been rather successful in life. I am unhappy about only one thing: I have not earned any money..."

The statement rang true. While millions passed through his hands, Emaer regularly spent more than he pulled in, sinking millions in the renovation of the Palace, and spending tens of thousands on parties that were successes in terms of pleasure and attendance, but never quite returned their investments.

He is remembered, nevertheless, for creating these mythical clubs, especially le Palace, which for its size and cultural impact continues to resonate in French society.
