= Ana María Simo =

American dramatist

- Born: Cuba
- Occupations: Playwright, essayist, novelist
- Known for: Lesbian Avengers
- Notable work: Dyke TV

Ana María Simo is a New York playwright, essayist and novelist. Born in Cuba, educated in France, and writing in English, she has collaborated with such experimental artists as composer Zeena Parkins, choreographer Stephanie Skura and filmmakers Ela Troyano and Abigail Child.

She made important contributions as a lesbian activist, co-founding projects such as Medusa's Revenge, the first lesbian theater in New York, the direct action group the Lesbian Avengers, Dyke TV, and The Gully online magazine.

== Career ==
=== Writer ===
Ana Maria Simo was 15 when she began working as a journalist in post-revolution Havana, where her first book was published: Las fábulas (The Fables), a short story collection. The book was published by Ediciones El Puente, a literary and publishing project (1961 to 1965) which Simo co-directed along with its founder, the poet José Mario Rodríguez.

Simo immigrated first to Paris, where she attended Roland Barthes' seminar and studied sociology and linguistics at the University of Paris VIII-Vincennes (1968-1972). In the mid-1970s she settled in New York, where she began her career as an English-language writer. Her association with playwright/director Maria Irene Fornes' theater workshop throughout the 1980s was pivotal in her development as a writer.

Some of her most notable works includes her 1990 play "Going to New England" produced at the INTAR theater. The New York Times' Stephen Holden gave the production mixed reviews, but also wrote that the play itself succeeded as "a study in physical and emotional claustrophobia" examining the traditions of Latin American machismo, Roman Catholic values, and erotic taboos.

Simo's "The Bad Play," a 1991 dance-theater collaboration with choreographer Stephanie Skura, also reviewed in The New York Times, was described as "a very broad and very funny parody" of the Hispanic soap opera with philandering doctors and cantankerous mothers-in-law.

Her 1989 short film, How to Kill Her, with Ela Troyano, premiered at the Lesbian and Gay Experimental Film Festival and later went on to win first place in The Latino Film and Video Festival.

Simo's work has mainly been produced in New York City by venues including P.S. 122, Theater for the New City, INTAR Hispanic American Arts Center, the New York Shakespeare Festival's Latino Festival, Duo Theatre, and the WOW Café.

Simo returned to fiction with her first novel, Heartland, published by Restless Books in 2018 after she was a finalist for their Prize for New Immigrant Writing. Heartland reflects Simo’s preoccupations with race, immigration, sex, and the burden of the past with an unsettling mix of noir, irreverence and hyperrealism already present in her plays. It was a finalist for the 2019 Triangle Lit Awards for the Edmund White Award for Debut Fiction.

=== Activist ===
Simo immigrated to Paris in time to participate in the student revolution of May 1968. Shortly afterwards, she participated in women's and lesbian/gay activist groups for the first time, including the Gouines Rouges (Red Dykes), the MLF (Mouvement de Libération des Femmes), and the FHAR (Front homosexuel d'action révolutionnaire).

In 1976 in New York, she co-founded the lesbian theater Medusa's Revenge with actor and director Magaly Alabau. In her book, Stagestruck: Theater, AIDS, and the Marketing of Gay America, Sarah Schulman writes,

"It is hard to find primary lesbian content on stage by an un-closeted writer before "Fefu and Her Friends" by Maria Irene Fornes in 1977. Or maybe it was Corinne Jacker's "Harry Outside" at the Circle Repertory Company in 1975. But, although each was sealed with a passionate kiss, both of these plays contained their lesbian content in subplots. Lesbian content was primary on stage at Medusa's Revenge at 10 Bleecker Street, the first theater in the world willing to produce our work."

In 1992, Simo co-founded the direct action group The Lesbian Avengers with longtime lesbian activists Maxine Wolfe, Anne-Christine d'Adesky, Sarah Schulman, Marie Honan, and Anne Maguire. The original group's sole stated focus: "Lesbian survival and visibility." The Lesbian Avengers inspired chapters worldwide. One of its long-term accomplishments is the annual Dyke March in New York City.

Shortly afterwards, along with video producer Mary Patierno and theater director Linda Chapman, she created Dyke TV. The half-hour television program produced by lesbians, for lesbians was aired on Public-access television across the United States for more than a decade. It included a mix of news, political commentary, the arts, health, and sports.

Simo also co-founded The Gully online magazine (2000-2006) with writer and activist Kelly Cogswell, "to encourage activism and redefine and expand gay issues." It offered queer views of international news, U.S. politics, activism, race, class, LGBT issues, and included a Spanish edition.

== Selected works ==
=== Novel ===
- Heartland (2018). Restless Books.

=== Plays ===
- Exiles, INTAR, NYC, 1982
- Pickaxe, WOW Theater, NYC, 1986
- What Do You See?, Theater for the New City, NYC, 1986
- Alma, INTAR, NYC, 1988
- Penguins, East 4th St. Theater, NYC 1989
- Going to New England, INTAR, NYC, 1990, Directed by Irene Fornes
- The Bad Play (Dance-theater piece, Choreography: Stephanie Skura) PS 122, NYC 1991; Bessie Schonberg Theatre, NYC, 1991; Walker Arts Center, Minneapolis, 1992.
- Ted and Edna (staged reading), La Mama, ETC, NYC 1990; New Dramatists, NYC 1993
- The Opium War (staged reading) New Dramatists, NYC 1990 and 1995; (workshop production) INTAR, NYC 1991, directed by Linda Chapman and Ana Maria Simo, Music composed by Zeena Parkins; New York Theatre Workshop, NYC,1996. Music-theatre piece. Music composed and directed by Zeena Parkins.
- Without Qualities (staged reading), New Dramatists, NYC, 1996

=== Radio, audio, film ===
- The Table of Liquid Measures (radio play), National Public Radio, Radio Stage. Producer: Sarah Montague, 1995
- The Opium War: A 71-minute piece with music composed and directed by Zeena Parkins, Roulette/Einstein, (EIN-010/CD), 1999
- How to Kill Her, short film with Ela Troyano, 1989

=== Short fiction, anthologies ===
- Dolan, Jill; Hughes, Holly; Tropicana, Carmelita (Eds). (2015). Memories of the Revolution: The First Ten Years of the WOW Café Theater. University of Michigan Press.
- Cooper, Dennis (Ed.). (1992). Discontents: New Queer Writers. Amethyst Press.
- Scholder, Amy, Silverberg, Ira (Eds.). (1991) High Risk: An Anthology of Forbidden Writings. Plume.
- Hasson, Liliane (Ed, Transl.). (1985). Cuba: nouvelles et contes d'aujourd'hui. Éditions L'Harmattan, (France).
- Cohen, John Michael (Ed.). (1967). Writers in the New Cuba: An Anthology. Penguin.
- Simo, Ana María. Las fábulas, Ediciones El Puente. (collection short stories)

=== Articles, monographs ===
- Simo, Ana Maria. Infernal Twins. Censorship as Social Death and What To Do About It pdf. Out/Look National Lesbian & Gay Quarterly, issue 13, summer 1991.
- Simo, Ana Maria. Lydia Cabrera: An Intimate Portrait. New York: Intar Latin American Gallery, 1988.
- Simo, Ana María and Garcia Ramos, Reinaldo. "Hablemos claro." Mariel: Revista de Literatura y Arte 2.5 (1984): 9-10.

== Bibliography ==
=== Queer / Latino theater ===
- Baeta, Virginia (2022). "Ana María Simo" in Noriega and Schildcrout (eds.) 50 Key Figures in Queer US Theatre, pp. 219–222. Routledge, ISBN 978-1032067964.
- Caulfield, Carlota and Davis, Darién J. (Eds.). (2007). A Companion to Us Latino Literatures. Tamesis Books.
- Gale, Maggie Barbara and Gardner, Vivien. (Eds.). (2004). Auto/biography and Identity: Women, Theatre, and Performance. Manchester University Press.
- Solomon, Alisa and Minwalla, Framji (Eds.). (2002). The Queerest Art: Essays on Lesbian and Gay Theater. New York University Press.
- Arrizón, Alica and Manzor, Lillian. (Eds.). (2000). Latinas on Stage: Practice and Theory. Third Woman Press.
- Sandoval-Sánchez, Alberto. (1999). José, Can You See?: Latinos on and Off Broadway. University of Wisconsin Press.
- Schulman, Sarah. (1998). Stagestruck: Theater, AIDS, and the Marketing of Gay America. Duke University Press.
- Peterson, Jane T. and Bennett, Suzanne. (1997). Women Playwrights of Diversity: A Bio-Bibliographical Sourcebook. Greenwood Publishing Group.
- Noriega, Chon A. and López, Ana M. (1996). The Ethnic Eye: Latino Media Arts. University of Minnesota Press.

=== Cuba ===
- Howe, Linda S. (2004). Transgression and Conformity: Cuban Writers and Artists After the Revolution. University of Wisconsin Press.
- Bejel, Emilio. (2001). Gay Cuban Nation. University Of Chicago Press.
- Quiroga, Jose. (2000). Tropics of Desire: Interventions from Queer Latino America. New York University Press
- Yáñez, Mirta, Cluster, Dick and Schuster, Cindy. (1998). Cubana: Contemporary Fiction by Cuban Women. Beacon Press
- Davies, Catherine. (1997). A Place in the Sun?: Women Writers in Twentieth-Century Cuba. Zed Books.
- Balderston, Daniel and Guy, Donna J. (1997). Sex and Sexuality in Latin America: An Interdisciplinary Reader. New York University Press.
- Lumsden, Ian. (1996). Machos, Maricones, and Gays: Cuba and Homosexuality. Temple University Press.
- Behar, Ruth. (1995). Bridges to Cuba: Puentes a Cuba. University of Michigan Press.
- Reed, Roger. (1991). The Cultural Revolution in Cuba. Latin American Round Table.
- "Interview with Ana Maria Simo." Daniels, Ian. Torch (New York). 15 December 1984, 14 January 1985.
