= Sylvie Grumbach =

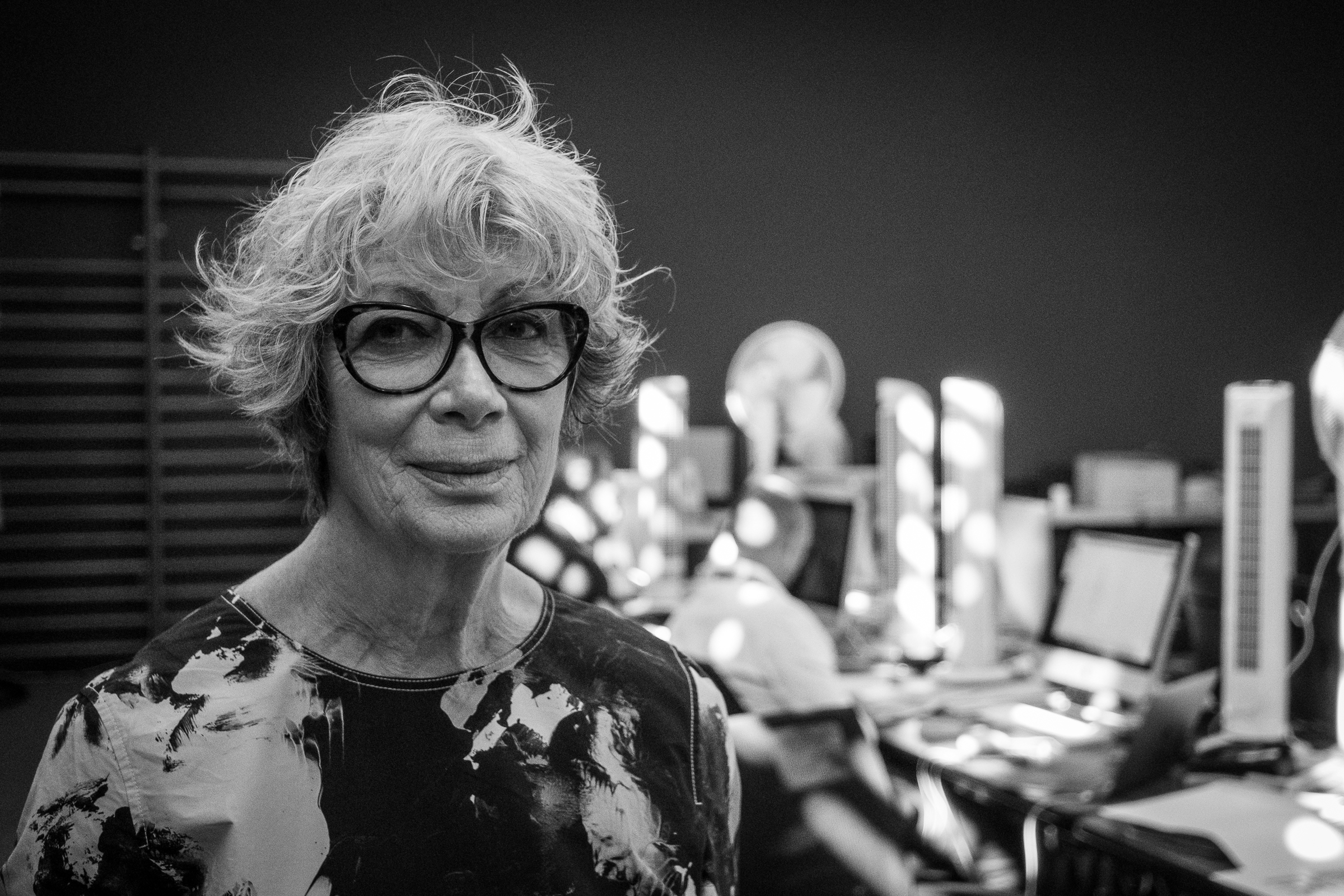
- Sylvie Grumbach in 2019
- Born: 22 March 1947 (age 79); Paris, France
- Occupation: Creative director of press agency 2e Bureau
- Website: www.2e-bureau.com

Sylvie Grumbach (born 22 March 1947) is the creative director and founder of 2e Bureau. She has been a fashion editor and press officer for various designers. Prior to this she worked as press attaché at Le Palace, a nightclub in Paris.

== Biography ==
Grumbach was born on 22 March 1947 in Paris. She is the grand-daughter of a Parisian fashion designer and Didier Grumbach's sister. Her grandfather, Cerf Mendes-France, founded the clothing company C.Mendes in 1902. Her maternal uncle is Pierre Mendes France, former president of the Council of the Fourth Republic.

Grumbach has been a fashion editor and press attaché for designers Emanuel Ungaro, Valentino, Vivienne Westwood, and Kohji Tatsuno.

=== Le Palace ===
Grumbach worked as press attaché at Le Palace, a nightclub in Paris that was notable during the 1970s and 1980s. After Fabrice Emaer's death she left the club. In 2004 Colin Ledoux interviewed Grumbach for his documentary, Rose Palace, that focused on the club.

=== 2e Bureau ===
2e Bureau was created by Grumbach on 26 April 1984 and has been participating in events including Visa pour l'Image in Perpignan since 1989. Its name is a pun. The 2eme Bureau was the name of the French secret service during the war. Grumbach chose this name to underline the fact she intends her agency to be like the second office of her clients, an indication of its commitment. The foreign brands have first offices located in other countries, so 2e Bureau aims to be their promotion and communication in France.

She has collaborated with people in fashion, photography, literature, humanitarian work, design, food, tourism, such as Motorola, Nokia, Swatch, Festival de Hyères, Paris Photo, Première Vision, Salon de la Photo, Azzedine Alaia, and World Press Photo. It aims to bring companies from different industries together to collaborate.
