= Jérôme de Missolz =

French film director

Jérôme de Missolz (8 October 1954 - 10 March 2016) was a French film director.

== Filmography ==
- 1976 : Promenade à travers la ville
- 1977 : Celluloid Heroes
- 1983 : Entrées de secours
- 1984 : H93
- 1988 : Furie Rock
- 1990 : Jan Saudek - Prague printemps 1990 (TV)
- 1990 : Beau Bleu
- 1992 : You'll Never Walk Alone (TV)
- 1993 : Chercheurs de disparus (TV)
- 1994 : La Machine mode
- 1994 : Joel-Peter Witkin - L'image indélébile (TV)
- 1994 : Agatha Christie, maîtresse du mystère (TV)
- 1995 : Yves Saint Laurent, tout terriblement (TV)
- 1995 : Le Flambe (TV)
- 1996 : I (comme Isabelle)
- 1996 : Fascisme, le retour (TV)
- 1996 : Nusrat Fateh Ali Khan, le dernier prophète (TV)
- 1997 : La Saga des Massey Ferguson (TV)
- 1998 : Sur les rives de l'Étang de Berre (TV)
- 1997 : La Saga des Massey Ferguson (TV)
- 2000 : La Mécanique des femmes (film)
- 2000 : Laurent Terzieff (TV)
- 2002 : Zone Reptile (TV)
- 2002 : Prague (TV)
- 2003 : Fred derrière le miroir (TV)
- 2003 : Chaplin Today: A King in New York (with Jim Jarmusch, TV)
- 2004 : Conjure (TV)
- 2004 : Roman et Erwan Bouroullec (TV)
- 2005 : Yohimbe Brothers (TV)
- 2006 : Four Walls (TV)
- 2006 : Sans titre
- 2007 : Le Corps sublimé
- 2008 : La Cigogne et l'éprouvette (TV)
- 2010 : Wild Thing, la folle histoire du rock (série TV)
- 2010 : David Bailey: Four Beats to the Bar and No Cheating (TV)
- 2010 : Wild Thing, la folle histoire du rock (TV)
- 2011 : Des jeunes gens modernes (film)
- 2011 : La Toundra des enfants perdus (TV)
- 2012 : Punkt (TV)
- 2014 : Drogue et Création. Une histoire des paradis artificiels (TV)
