= Maud Molyneux =

Maud Molyneux (27 March 1948 – 16 September 2008) was a transgender French actress, journalist and costume designer.

== Career ==
Maud Molyneux started out as an activist in the Front homosexuel d'action révolutionnaire (FHAR), and then founded the Gazolines movement with Patrick Bertaux and Paquita Paquin. In the 1970s and 80s, she became widely known for her interviews in Façade magazine and her columns in the Libération (also known as Libé) daily French newspaper, in which she wrote about television and fashion (as herself), literature (under the pseudonym of Dora Forbes), and cinema (under the pseudonym of Louella Intérim).

== Filmography ==
=== Acting ===
- 1974: Les Intrigues de Sylvia Couski by Adolfo Arrieta
- 1976: Tam Tam by Adolfo Arrieta
- 1976: Mélodrame by Jean-Louis Jorge (as Anna)
- 1981: Cinématon by Gérard Courant (as herself)
- 1985: La Nuit porte-jarretelles by Virginie Thévenet
- 1987: Jeux d'artifices by Virginie Thévenet (as Mrs Duval)

=== Costume Design ===
- 1999: The Dilettante by Pascal Thomas
- 2001: Day Off by Pascal Thomas
- 2004: Quand je serai star by Patrick Mimouni
- 2005: Mon petit doigt m'a dit... by Pascal Thomas
- 2006: Le Grand Appartement by Pascal Thomas
- 2008: Je vous hais petites filles (short film) by Yann Gonzalez
