= Maxine Wolfe =

American author, scholar, and civil rights activist

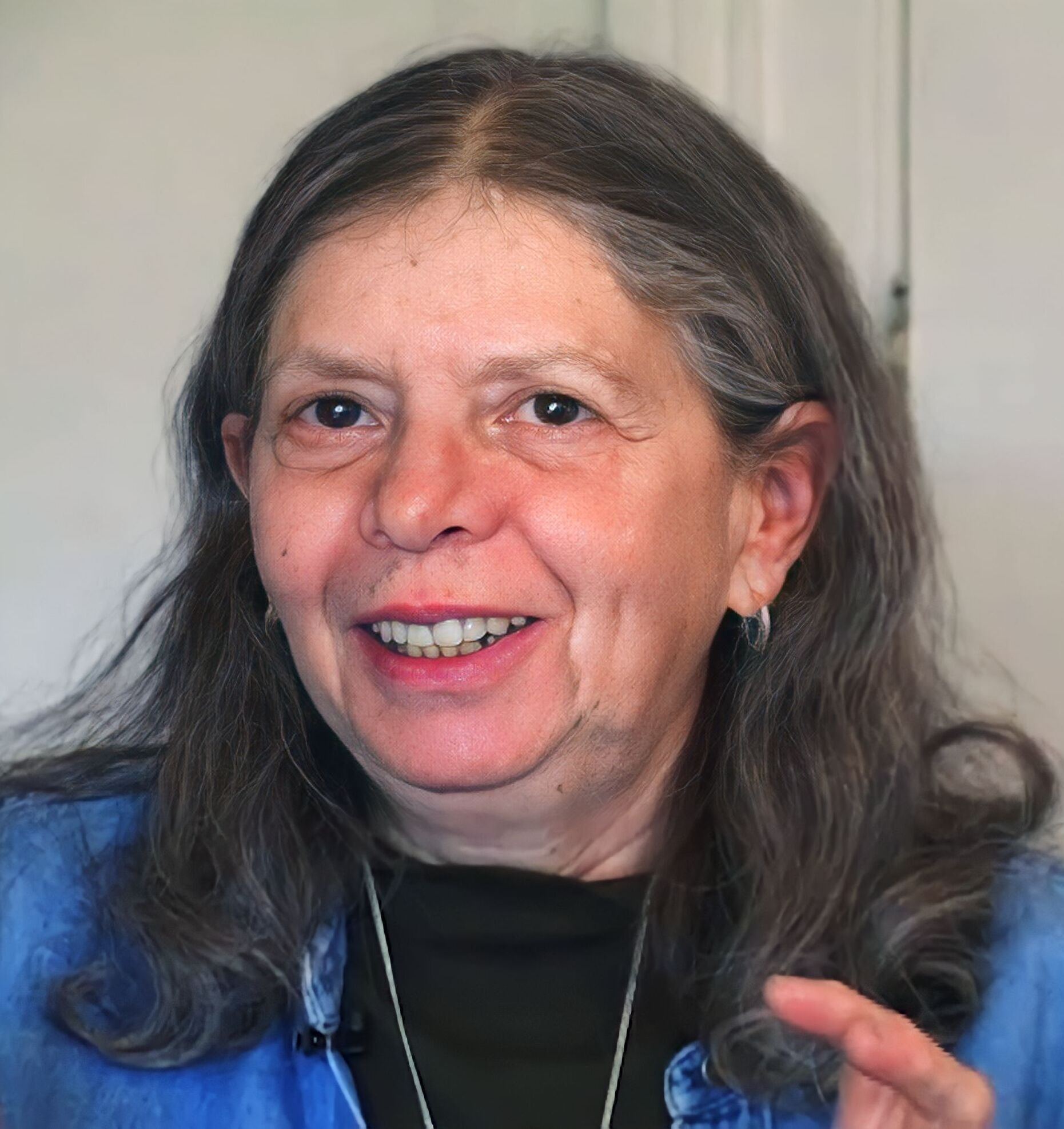
- Portrait of Maxine Wolfe from the Lesbian History Archives c. 2017
- Born: 1942 (age 83–84)
- Education: Brooklyn College, B.A., 1961; City University of New York, PhD
- Employer: Lesbian Herstory Archives
- Organization(s): ACT UP, Lesbian Avengers, Queer Nation
- Known for: Lesbian activism, ACT UP activism

Maxine Wolfe (born April 1941) is an American author, scholar, and activist for AIDS, civil rights, lesbian rights, and reproductive rights. Wolfe is a co-founder of the Lesbian Avengers, a coordinator at the Lesbian Herstory Archives, and a member of Queer Nation. Wolfe is currently a Professor Emerita of Women's and Gender Studies at the Graduate Center, CUNY.

== Early life and education ==
Wolfe was raised in Brooklyn, New York, in a Jewish immigrant household described by Wolfe as "poor". At the of age 16, Wolfe became a first-generation college student at Brooklyn College, graduating with her B.A. degree in 1961. Wolfe engaged in civil rights activism, including attending the 1963 March on Washington and working on economic and civil rights issues with the Brooklyn Congress of Racial Equality (Brooklyn CORE). Wolfe went on to obtain her master's degree and PhD in Environmental psychology at the City University of New York.

== Activism ==
In the late 1970s, Wolfe joined the Coalition for Abortion Rights and Against Sterilization Abuse (CARASA) and subsequently got involved in the national committee that pushed for the creation of the Reproductive Rights National Network. Wolfe then additionally became a member of that committee. She then demonstrated against Joseph Califano, the Secretary of Health, Education, and Welfare in 1977–1979 (SITE), over reproductive rights among other related topics. Wolfe then joined the Lesbian Action Committee, finding extreme difficulty in recruiting other women who had not yet "come out." The committee began with educational information and demonstrations, which were originally perceived by the public as them trying to "turn everyone lesbian." As the Lesbian Action Committee evolved, they wanted to work with the Reproductive Rights National Network to present information about lesbian-focused material. Despite their intentions, some people in CARASA didn't want this type of publicity, distancing themselves from Wolfe and the Lesbian Action Committee. Because the Human Life Amendment was being considered by Congress, some members of the group participated in civil disobedience by disrupting the hearings in Washington, which resulted in arrests and convictions.

As the Family Protection Act bill was released in 1980, the coalition named Committee Against Racism Anti-Semitism, Sexism, and Heterosexism (CRASH), was born, consisting of Maxine Wolfe from CARASA, Joan Gibbs representing Dykes Against Racism Everywhere, Laurie Morton representing Radical Women, Naomi Brussel representing the Committee of Lesbian and Gay Men Socialists and other organizations include Lavender Left and Black and White Men Together. This coalition held a conference over the Family Protection Act and began doing demonstrations about the Human Life Amendment and many other things. There was not a mass movement at the time, yet CRASH demonstrated at the Neighborhood Church where 500 people showed up, setting the stage for future traditions within the gay, feminist, and later AIDS movements.

In 1985, the Gay and Lesbian Alliance Against Defamation (GLAAD) was created, and Wolfe attended the first public event in connection with the AIDS crisis. This same year, Wolfe was arrested for sitting in on the hearing for the Gay Rights Bill with a "Lesbian Liberation, We Won't Go Away" sign, refusing to leave after the hearing had ended without a vote. In 1987, Wolfe attended the ACT UP 24-hour picket at Sloan Kettering as well as the March on Washington in October 1987. Because of Wolfe's previous political experience, she led the way in getting ACT UP involved in policy instead of just advocacy to continue this mass movement. She also coordinated Woman and AIDS, an event at Shea Stadium where the METS played. Around 60 men and women from ACT UP went to the game with signs to be televised across America and reach the large crowd of fans at the game. She was also involved with Stop the Church and organized the campaign to change the CDC definition of AIDS. In addition, Wolfe worked on campaigns and committees for AIDS research, pharmaceuticals, and more access to care and education.

In Let The Record Show: A Political History of ACT UP New York, 1987–1993, Sarah Schulman writes: "Scanning the interviews I conducted with a wide range and demographic of ACT UPers, the two names that emerge most often in reference to internal leadership are clearly Maxine Wolfe and Mark Harrington...these two were repeatedly named as profound influences." Schulman also writes: "These are the two people most often blamed with ACT UP's downfall and self-defeat, and the two most frequently named at the center of ACT UP's victories and strengths."

Wolfe left ACT UP in 1997. As of 2004, she lives in Brooklyn, New York.

== Personal life ==
Wolfe was married after graduating from college at the age of 19. Reflecting on this marriage in 2003, Wolfe said:

"...That's what everybody I know did. It's really hard for people to believe that about me because I think that people do not understand how much the world has changed. But, the world that I lived in was a working-class immigrant world...I never even knew what college was like. ...I just think it was, like, expected. It was a way to leave home. It was a whole number of things, and I just knew it was wrong three days after I did it, and I had no idea what to do about that and I, seriously, spent 10 years trying to figure out what to do."

Wolfe began to consider herself a lesbian in the late 1970s.
