= Murders of Roxanne Ellis and Michelle Abdill =

American murder victims

- Location: Medford, Oregon, U.S.
- Date: December 4, 1995; 30 years ago
- Attack type: Murder, violence against LGBT people
- Victims: Roxanne Ellis, aged 53; Michelle Abdill, aged 42
- Perpetrators: Robert Acremant
- Convictions: Aggravated murder Kidnapping; Robbery (Note: Acremant was also convicted of first degree murder with special circumstances in California for the October 1995 murder of Scott George.)
- Sentence: Death by lethal injection

Roxanne Ellis (November 4, 1942 – December 4, 1995) and Michelle Abdill (July 8, 1953 – December 4, 1995) were a lesbian couple, murdered in Medford, Oregon, by Robert Acremant.

== Background ==
In 1990, after enduring increasing homophobia in Colorado, Michelle Abdill and Roxanne Ellis moved from Colorado Springs, Colorado, to Medford, Oregon. The couple met in Colorado, where Ellis—divorced with two children—worked as an obstetrics nurse. Abdill got a job in the same doctor's office, and they eventually became life-partners.

The couple started a successful property management business and were elected to the board of their church. They spent their spare time restoring their old Craftsman-style house and visiting Ellis's three-year-old granddaughter. They also worked as activists, fighting two Oregon state ballot initiatives in 1992 and 1993; Measure 9 intended to amend the state constitution to declare homosexuality "abnormal, wrong, unnatural and perverse," and Measure 19 intended to restrict library access for materials related to homosexuality.

At the time of their murders, Ellis and Abdill had been together for 12 years.

== Murders ==
On December 4, 1995, Ellis, 53, went to an appointment with 27-year-old Robert Acremant to show him an apartment. Police believed the appointment was made earlier that day. Ellis allegedly called her daughter, Lorri, at 4:00 p.m. to tell her she was going shopping.

Abdill, 42, left the office at 5:00 p.m. saying that she was leaving to help Ellis jump start her car after receiving a call that the car would not start. Later, Ellis's daughter drove over to the apartment complex where her mother was going to show the apartment and saw her mother's pickup. She said it pulled away from her when she tried to follow it.

Ellis and Abdill were not seen again until their bodies were discovered four days later in the back of Ellis's pickup truck, after a cable TV worker reported the vehicle to police. Both women had been bound and gagged, and shot in the head. The bodies were wrapped in drapes and covered by cardboard boxes.

== Publicity and arrest ==
The discovery of the bodies caused concern in the local gay community. The couple's activism on gay rights issues, and records of an earlier threat against them, roused suspicion that they had fallen victim to a hate crime. The National Gay and Lesbian Task Force wrote to Attorney General Janet Reno to request that the United States Department of Justice assist local authorities in their investigation. The letter cited the Justice Department's guidelines, which said a crime motivated by bias "in whole or in part" should be considered a hate crime.

The nature of the crime, and the couple's activism, led to widespread publicity about the case. Police publicized a composite sketch of the suspect based on a description of a witness who had seen a man–Acremant–park Ellis' truck and walk away.

The media coverage of the murders reached Acremant's mother, who had moved to Medford three weeks earlier with her son. Believing her son had committed the murders, she called a police tip line and told police of her suspicion, based on her son's behavior and his resemblance to the composite sketch. She also showed police the labels of cardboard boxes used during her move to Medford with Acremant. Police matched the address labels to those on the boxes used to cover the women's bodies.

She later told The Oregonian, "I called the police because I have to look God in the face. I will do anything in my power to make sure other people aren't hurt. But right now, he's sick."

Police contacted California authorities and found that Acremant was under investigation there for the October 3 disappearance of one of his friends. He was tracked down to a Stockton motel room and arrested on December 13, 1995.

Upon arrest, Acremant confessed to the Ellis and Abdill murders, claiming that his motive was robbery. According to Acremant, after they refused his demand to write checks made out to him from their business account, he shot both women in the back of the head execution-style, having bound and gagged them with duct tape and forced them to lie down in the back of Ellis's pickup truck.

Acremant also confessed to killing Scott George of Visalia, California, on October 3, 1995, and dumping his body down a mine shaft located outside his father's ranch near Stockton. On December 18, 1995, after Acremant told his father where he had disposed of the body, police discovered George's remains at the bottom of an abandoned mine shaft in Calaveras County, California.

== Robert Acremant ==
Acremant served in the Air Force and earned a master's degree in Business Administration from San Francisco's Golden Gate University, in half the time usually required. Later, he worked as a district operations manager at Roadway Trucking in Los Angeles.

Acremant left his job at Roadway Trucking to start his own software business. He became frustrated by the failure of his software company, and his own failure to find a job and achieve financial security.

His money frustrations were compounded by depression when he was rejected by a Las Vegas stripper named Alla Kosova (stage name Ecstasy), whom he considered to be his girlfriend, because he did not have enough money to visit her.

== Motives ==
=== Robbery ===
Acremant's statements about his motive have shifted over time. He has said that his intention was to rob Ellis and Abdill. Media reports said the robbery scheme was part of a plan to get enough money to win back Kosova.

However, the district attorney in the case noted that some of the evidence undermines robbery as the only motive, as Acremant left the victims' purses, wallets, jewelry, cell phones, and money at the scene. When Ellis' daughter arrived at the complex, she and Abdill's brother—Dan Abdill—spotted Abdill's unlocked vehicle at the scene, with her purse in plain view, which prompted them to call the police.

=== Homophobia ===
In August 1996, Acremant wrote a letter to his hometown newspaper, the Stockton Record, stating that he had intended to rob Ellis and Abdill and that knowing they were lesbians made it easier to kill them. He also wrote that he had killed Scott George, who was reportedly bisexual, because he had made a pass at him. Acremant also claimed to be a victim of childhood sexual abuse.

In his three-page letter, Acremant claimed he invented the robbery motive because he feared reactions from inmates who might learn that his murders were "hate crimes against bi- and homosexuals."

In an interview with the Stockton Record from his jail cell, Acremant said he had no problem with bisexual women but had "no compassion" for lesbians, bisexual or gay men."

Interviews and media reports confirm that Acremant knew the women were lesbians. He had previous contact with Ellis two weeks before the murders, when he had been shown the same apartment where he met Ellis on December 4, 1995.

Acremant also acknowledged that he had asked Ellis—the victim with whom he spent the most time—if they were lesbians and she said they were.

Interviews indicated he may have spent some of the time before Abdill's arrival asking Ellis about details of their life. In an interview with The Oregonian he said it made him "sick to my stomach" to learn that she was "someone's grandma." In an interview with The San Francisco Examiner he revealed that he knew Abdill was 54 years old, and that she and Ellis had been together for 12 years.

Acremant also told The Oregonian that there was a common thread to the Ellis and Abdill murders and that of Scott George.

Acremant later recanted his earlier claim to have killed Ellis and Abdill because of their sexual orientation. He attributed his murders of Abdill and Ellis, as well as George, to a sudden urge, claiming that he hadn't felt like killing Ellis and Abdill until he'd bound and gagged them and forced them to lie down in the back of Ellis' truck. He also claimed to have killed George because he wanted to test the silencer he'd just built for his handgun.

==== Alla Kosova ====
At Acremant's trial in 2007, 33-year-old Kosova, an immigrant from Russia, testified she had indeed cut off their relationship, which began in April 1995 when she was 20–21 years old, in August of the same year. She confirmed that they had a relationship, but said that it was purely financial in nature as far as she was concerned.

Kosova said he spent up to $3,000 per weekend on her at the club where she danced, had bought her two pairs of diamond earrings, and occasionally took her out to dinner. She stated they never had sex.

Their relationship ended when the unemployed Acremant spent his savings and retirement fund and maxed out his credit cards. When he called her and claimed that a man in New York City had stolen his money and he had none left, Kosova said she changed her number and severed ties with him.

Acremant surfaced again in Kosova's life when he returned to Las Vegas after the murders of Ellis and Abdill. He spent $5,000 from the sale of his car paying women to dance for her, which she said was a fantasy of his.

After taking her to dinner on December 10, Kosova said Acremant pulled out a gun and a stun gun as they sat in her truck and told her he had killed three people; two just that week. He unscrewed the silencer on the gun and showed her the blood inside.

Later, Kosova told a police officer, a regular customer at the club, what Acremant told her about the murders, but she said he didn't take her seriously.

Afterward, she told Acremant they were through. After his arrest, however, the television program Inside Edition paid for Kosova to visit Acremant in the Jackson County jail, for what she told him was "the final time."

Kosova would return to television in September 2005 as Alla Wartenberg, a successful businesswoman and contestant during the fourth season of the television show The Apprentice.

== Guilty plea and death penalty ==
Upon his arrest, Acremant declared that he wished to be executed by lethal injection. By that time Oregon had not executed an inmate in over 30 years. One month later he entered a not guilty plea and his lawyers filed motions to overturn Oregon's death penalty.

On September 11, 1996, Acremant pleaded guilty to the murders of Ellis and Abdill.

On October 27, 1997, an Oregon jury sentenced Acremant to death by lethal injection for the murders of Roxanne Ellis and Michelle Abdill.

On March 15, 2005, Oregon's high court upheld Acremant's death sentence.

In February 2011, an Oregon court declared Acremant so delusional that he could not assist in his death sentence appeal and his sentence was reduced to life without parole. He also faced a death sentence in California for killing Scott George.

== Aftermath ==
On August 9, 1996, an LGBTQ advocacy and education center opened in Ashland, named the Abdill-Ellis Lambda Community Center in honor of the murdered pair. The Abdill-Ellis Lambda Community Center closed in August 2010.

In April 2001, Sen. Gordon H. Smith (R-OR) cited the murders when arguing in the U.S. Senate on behalf of a hate crimes provision proposed for inclusion in the Local Law Enforcement Act of 2001.

Acremant was found dead in his death row cell Friday, October 26, 2018. He died from natural causes.

== TV documentaries ==
The murder of Ellis and Abdill was featured on the series Very Bad Men, on the Investigation Discovery channel that first aired in August 2012.

This case was also featured in TV show Forensic Files, season 12, episode 25: "Printed Proof".

The murders of Roxanne Ellis, Michelle Abdill, and Scott George were featured in the 2026 episode “A Father’s Pain” of Evil Lives Here: My Child the Killer (season one, episode two) on the Investigative Discovery channel.

== See also ==
- List of homicides in Oregon
- Matthew Shepard and James Byrd Jr. Hate Crimes Prevention Act
- Murders of Hattie Mae Cohens and Brian Mock
- Violence against LGBTQ people
