= Guy Cuevas =

Cuban DJ (born 1945)

Guy Cuevas is a Cuban-born writer, musician, and Paris disc jockey. Born Guillermo Cuevas Carrión, he worked the turntables at Club Sept, and Le Palace before becoming the artistic director, first of Les Bains-Douches, then the Barrio Latino.

As a DJ, he was known for a mix featuring the funk and soul of the Philadelphia Sound, along with his connections to the world of high fashion.

== Cuban Origins ==
Guy Cuevas, (Guillermo Cuevas Carrión) was born in Havana, Cuba in 1945. He was awarded a scholarship to a playwriting workshop created shortly after the 1959 revolution. The workshop was held at the National Theater of Cuba directed by Fermín Borges, other students included Eugenio Hernández, Gerardo Fulleda León, Ana Justina Cabrera, Santiago Ruiz and José Mario Rodríguez, many of whom have made names for themselves as playwrights and authors.

Fulleda León remembers the group hanging out for long hours after class in cafes or street corners to talk about essays, plays, ethnographies, stories and poems, or whatever they were working on.

While still attending the workshop, Cuevas published a collection of short stories, "Ni un Sí, ni un No" with Ediciones El Puente founded by fellow student José Mario Rodríguez.

In 1964, Cuevas immigrated to France where he continued to write, sleeping on floors and working odd jobs until he got his first job DJing at club Nuage. His big break came shortly afterward, when he was discovered by the openly gay impresario Fabrice Emaer, who hired him as a DJ at Club Sept, his restaurant-discothèque at 7 (sept) Sainte-Anne street.

== Career: Disc Jockey ==
=== Le Sept ===
In Paris you got to be seen at Maxim's
The Palace
The 7 and then go Chez Regine
Champagne
Caviar
Haute-couture
Expensive cars
Saint Laurent and Loulou
Rich ladies with a few bijoux.

—Amanda Lear, Fashion Pack, 1979

Situated in the middle of the gay neighborhood near the Palais-Royal, Le Sept had a restaurant on the ground floor and a small dance floor in the basement.

One writer has called the Sept, "the epicenter of disco with DJ Guy Cuevas at the turntables.

He played the O'Jays, Billy Paul, Teddy Pendergrass and Marvin Gaye, as well as Salsa and Latin American music, and sometimes, "stuff that wasn't at all danceable, like Marilyn Monroe or bird sounds or tam tam, whatever passed through my head."

He spent his days listening to records at, Chez Givaudan. At night he'd put on his new discoveries.

Paquita Paquin, a journalist and former club goer wrote in her recent memoirs: "At the end of the night, he would sometimes agree to put on some of our requests, but if not, would explain about balance, strength, and the rhythm he was looking for in his program that didn't always leave room for our endless hits. Guy Cuevas is a genius.".

=== The Palace ===
Le Club Sept was only a rehearsal for what was to come. From the opening night, Le Palace reflected the arrival of disco with Grace Jones surrounded by dry ice and shining roses, singing La Vie en Rose atop a pink Harley Davidson. It was the temple of a new style of music that caught the world by surprise... Guy Cuevas had followed Emaer to the Palace, and there his selection was the same: flamboyant. For the first time people danced all the time, not leaving the dance floor except for a quick trip to the toilets or the bar. The music was so sensational that it gave the impression that the Palace was a trampoline in the middle of the Atlantic : Let's All Chant by the Michael Zager Band was a hit in France at the same time as the U.S. Suddenly dancing became a lifestyle.

Emaer's inspiration for Le Palace was a visit to New York in 1977, in which he discovered Studio 54. He said of his impressions, "It is completely sterilized, a ghetto for model agencies and Régine's emirs..." He described the clubgoers as "totally clean, beautiful, they look like they are fed on high quality corn." He chose Le Palace as a French response.

The theater space, where the balconies were left intact, allowed le Palace more flexibility than Studio 54. The club sometimes held live concerts (Prince, Bette Midler, Divine, Tom Waits...), premiered films or showed clips during the music. Balls were organized by designers like Kenzo and Karl Lagerfeld.

However, Cuevas reports that his DJing at the Palace was more conventional than at the Sept, largely because the financial stakes were so high. Prior to the opening, he actually made several trips to New York to study their rival, Studio 54. "In terms of the general programming of the DJ, I noticed that his choice was systematically efficient and commercial. Above all, he played what the crowd was waiting for, the things that were in fashion at the time, which means Disco! When le Palace opened in March of 1978... I also successfully played the disco card."

He put on Donna Summer, the Village People, and the Bee Gees, but would also slip in a few unknown pearls, or segments of something totally unexpected, like the helicopter sounds from the original soundtrack from the film Apocalypse Now, or a little bit of a Vivaldi concerto.

For Cuevas, le Palace was a less fun than the Sept: "It sounded so repetitive to my ears I had to fight against boredom. I wanted to create something, to invent, but I got stuck slapping the same hits on the turntable." When he moved on, he worked as a host with Paquita Paquin in the downstairs club, called Le Privilege, before he left the club for good in 1982.

Afterward, Cuevas worked for several years as an artistic director, first of the club Bains Douches on rue du Bourg l'Abbé, then at the Barrio Latio on rue du Faubourg Saint-Antoine. He also continued DJing fashion shows and doing small parts in movies.

== Career: Music and Fashion ==
He recorded three singles, Ebony Game (1981) with Gaumont Musique, and Obsession (1982), and Gallo Negro (1984) with Island Records.

His single "Obsessions" was released only in France. It was re-released in 2008 as part of Funky Nassau - The Compass Point Story 1980–1986 on Strut Records.

Cuevas was also drawn to fashion. A recent auction of Cuevas' vintage wardrobe at AuctionArt included clothes by Yves Saint Laurent, Monana, Kenzo, Hermes, Gucci, Louis Vuitton, Pierre Cardin, Dior most of which were given to Cuevas by the designers themselves.

In the 1990s, he had his own fashion line and boutique in St. Germain, encouraged by many of the designers that were his personal friends.

== Publications ==
- Ni un Sí, ni un No. Ediciones El Puente.
- Ochún en el Sena

== Filmography ==
- Target of Suspicion (1994) (TV)
- Cómo ser infeliz y disfrutarlo (1994)
- Nefertiti, figlia del sole (1994)
- L'enfant lion (1993)
- Ne réveillez pas un flic qui dort (1988)
- Les frères Pétard (1986)
- Under the Cherry Moon (1986)
- The Jewel of the Nile (1985)
- Un été d'enfer (1984)

== Discography ==
=== Releases ===
- Ebony Game (7") Gaumont Musique 1981
- Obsession (12") Island Records 1982
- Gallo Negro (12") Island Records 1984

=== Tracks Appear On ===
- Funky Nassau - The Compass Point Story 1980-1986 (CD)
- Obsession (Nassau Mix) Strut 2008

=== Unofficial Releases ===
Acoustic Boogie EP (12", EP) Ebony Games (Lexx's Iv... Tracky Bottoms 2008
