= Rose Hartman =

American photographer, travel writer, author

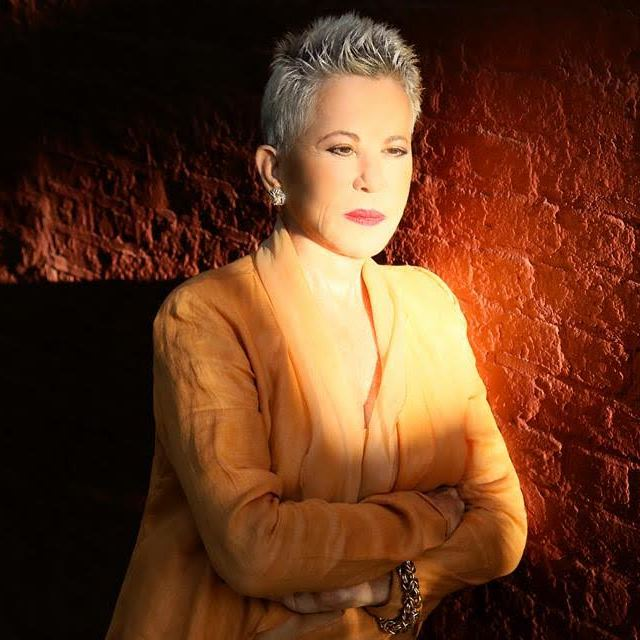
- Born: May 16, 1937 (age 88); New York City, U.S.
- Occupations: Photographer, writer
- Notable work: Photograph of Bianca Jagger riding a white horse at Studio 54
- Website: rosehartman.com

Rose Hartman (born May 16, 1937) is an American photographer, travel writer, and author who lives in New York City. She traces the start of her photography career to a 1976 assignment from Daily News Record to shoot an elaborate Hemingway wedding in Sun Valley, Idaho. She is the subject of the 2016 documentary film The Incomparable Rose Hartman.

== Career ==
Hartman is known for her celebrity portraiture. Her photograph of Bianca Jagger riding a white horse at the Studio 54 nightclub at her 30th birthday party is widely known as her most recognizable photo. Lloyd Grove, writing in The Daily Beast, describes it in 2016 as "the iconic image of a long-lost age." Another well-known photograph portrays Jerry Hall in conversation with Andy Warhol. Her photographs have been published in newspapers and magazines, including Allure, Art+Auction, Elle, Harper's Bazaar, Panorama, The New York Times, New York, Stern, Vanity Fair and Vogue.

In addition to documenting celebrities, the jet set, actors, singers, and authors, Hartman was the first to move behind the curtains of Fashion Week catwalks to shoot models and designers backstage as shown in her first book "Birds of Paradise: An Intimate View of the New York Fashion World." In 2011–12, a retrospective of her work including more than 60 photographs was held at the Fashion Institute of Technology in New York. Her archival images have also been exhibited at the Ravestijn Gallery in Amsterdam, the Netherlands (2012) and in Punta del Este, Uruguay (2013), as well as at American museums including the Experience Music Project, The Whitney Museum and Museum of the City of New York; a selection of her photographs is also on permanent display at Omar's, a private dining members club in Greenwich Village.

Otis Mass directed the 2016 feature-length documentary film The Incomparable Rose Hartman, which earned a jury award of special mention at the Doc NYC film festival.

== Publications ==
- Rose Hartman: Birds of Paradise (1980)
- Rose Hartman: Incomparable: Women of Style (2012)
- Rose Hartman: Incomparable Couples (2015)
