= Ediciones El Puente =

Literary project for young writers in Cuba

Ediciones El Puente (The Bridge Publications) was a literary project for young writers in Cuba just after the 1959 revolution. Between 1961 and 1965, they published each other's work, introduced dozens of new voices – among them poet and translator Nancy Morejón, playwright Gerardo Fulleda León, playwright-activist Ana Maria Simo and folklorist Miguel Barnet – and held readings and performances.

Nevertheless, El Puente is remembered primarily as one of the casualties of the wave of social repression in Cuba in the 1960s and 1970s. Accused, among other things, of fostering homosexuality, Black Power, publishing exiles, and consorting with foreigners, some members were detained, and/or sent to the UMAP concentration camps. A few left the country.

Cuban literary critics are beginning to address the group, and in 2005, the Gaceta de Cuba published a series of pieces on El Puente. Much of the group's work was republished and analyzed in the 2011 book Ediciones El Puente en la Habana de los años 60: Lecturas críticas y libros de poesía, edited and introduced by Jesús J. Barquet.

== Origins ==
El Puente was begun by José Mario Rodríguez (b. 1940, Güira de Melena – d. 2002, Madrid), a young poet who perceived the post-revolution literary world in Havana as closed to new writers. "[Lunes de Revolución] only covered people connected to the director Guillermo Cabrera Infante, and they never reviewed books by young writers." He wanted to create a publishing project that would be open to everyone, "Especially young people, new people. We wanted to find new talents with quality works inside Cuban culture. That's the thing that interested us most."

Gerardo Fulleda León remembered meeting José Mario in 1961 at a theater workshop that was also attended by playwright Eugenio Hernández Espinosa.

"The next day, in the José Martí National Library, he and Eugenio introduced me to Ana Justina Cabrera and after that to Ana María Simo. We immediately began to exchange opinions, argue about certain points, and on others agree. From that day forward, we scheduled appointments or met up in the afternoons in the gardens of the Writer's Union, in the park, at the entrance to a series of Soviet films at the Cinemateca de Cuba, at a theater function in Mella, in the hallways of an exhibit of Portocarrero, at a concert of Bola or Burke; the afternoon would turn into night and we would go to listen to a concert of filin at El Gato Tuerto, or jazz at the Atelier. We went up and down La Rampa and ended up at dawn at the Malecón reading poems, singing boleros, and telling each other our hopes and dreams."

The books they shared included authors such as Borges, Lautréamont, Rimbaud, Cuban poet Emilio Ballagas, Nerval, Rilke, Tagore, Mayakovsky, Salvatore Quasimodo, Essenin, poet Vicente Huidobro, Proust, Seferis, Dylan Thomas, and Holderlin.

Within a short time they began publishing as a group. Ana María Simo became co-director of the project, largely focusing on the production end and editing fiction. Other core members included Gerardo Fulleda León, Nancy Morejón, Ana Justina, and Reinaldo García Ramos (Reinaldo Felipe), who later made up the board of directors.

== Impact ==
In practical terms, the impact of the group can be seen in what and who they published. Self-subsidized (funds came largely from José Mario's father ("La verídica historia") and Ana María Simo, who was working as a journalist) and publishing with editorial independence, even after they were persuaded to ally themselves with the Writers Union (Unión de Escritores y Artistas de Cuba – UNEAC), El Puente introduced dozens of new voices to the literary scene, eventually publishing more than twenty writers and offering more than three dozen books of poetry, theater, fiction, and folklore.

Writers who got their start with El Puente include prize-winning poet and translator Nancy Morejón, playwright Gerardo Fulleda León, now director of the Rita Montaner theater company in Havana, folklorist Miguel Barnet, and playwright and lesbian activist Ana María Simo.

El Puente's long-term impact as a movement is more difficult to gauge. Emerging from the euphoria of the revolution, they were seen by some, including themselves, as embodying the post-revolution generation. Cuban-Chilean poet Alberto Baeza Flores in particular hailed them as a kind of unifying movement, gathering together "a generation of young writers, which was the first surge in tandem with the Cuban revolution, and which is a brilliant and critical generation."

They deliberately worked in opposition to the previous generations that they saw as excluding and elitist. They were especially determined to assert their intellectual freedom and claim all writing that reflected the gamut of Cuban society, even from writers that left the island. Anthologies, such as La Novísima Poesía Cubana (1962) edited by Reinaldo Garcia Ramos and Ana María Simo, in part expressed this literary ethos that had less to do with rigorous craft or a common style, than fresh points of view.

And while Simo's book of short stories, Las Fábulas, was one of the few ever reviewed, the books regularly found an audience, and some of the other arts communities were also enthusiastic about El Puente. Book covers were designed by young architecture students and visual artists, including Gilberto Seguí, David Bigelman and José Lorenzo. A collaborative performance with "feeling" composers including Marta Valdés, Cesar Portillo de la Luz, José Antonio Méndez, Ela O'Farril, and others at the El Gato Tuerto had fans lined up down the block. They had exchanges of ideas with playwrights like Eugenio Hernández Espinosa, even though they weren't necessarily published by El Puente. A young philosophy professor, Josefina Suárez, also became central to the group, introducing some of her students, like the poet Liliam Moro.

Not everyone agreed that El Puente represented the post-revolution generation, or that they served any useful purpose at all. At the time, critics such as Jesús Díaz, for instance, said they did not represent anything except a very small "dissolute" fringe, and charged not only that some of the writing was uneven, but that El Puente was "a politically and aesthetically erroneous phenomenon." A criticism easier to divorce from politics was that José Mario used the group, perhaps too frequently, to publish his own poems.

In more recent times, several contemporary researchers in Cuba seem to see its diversity as one of El Puente's greatest contributions.

== Diversity ==
The core group had as many women as men, and women are central in the list of published works (see Publications). Most of the writers were poor or working-class. Many were black or mixed-race at a time when people of color were underrepresented in the literary world.

The group published the first two books of poems by Nancy Morejón. "El Puente was vital for us, for me, on a personal level. One fine day José Mario Rodríguez, its director, came, and asked me for some poems. It was the first disinterested publishing project that didn't have second or third motives."

José Mario downplayed his role in recruiting the participation of black writers, though he was a friend of Walterio Carbonell, an embattled proponent of a French-style "Negritude," one of the first Cuban writers to address the role of race on the evolution of Cuban culture in his 1961 essay, "How the National Culture Developed" (Cómo surge la cultura nacional).

"It's true that El Puente had a lot of black writers, like Nancy Morejón, Ana Justina Cabrera, Gerardo Fulleda León, Eugenio Hernández, Georgina Herrera, Rogelio Martínez Furé, Pedro Pérez Sarduy and others. I think this happened a little by chance. We met in the National Library and outside of this building if you remember, there were some of [Havana's] poorest neighborhoods; a lot of people that went to these meetings came from these "mansions." They had few economic resources. They were neighborhoods that were largely black. Ana Justina and Eugenio lived nearby, just behind the Library."

Many members of the group were also lesbian or gay.

== Climate of homophobia ==
While Che Guevara once reportedly threw a book across the room in disgust because it was written by gay author Virgilio Piñera, Cuba didn't need the Argentine revolutionary to introduce homophobia. Already a part of Hispanic and Western cultures, it was underlying in such works as José Martí's 1894 "Our America", in which the poet and revolutionary not only offered an early analysis of the growing U.S. role in the region, but dismissed loyalists to Spain as delicate ones "that are men and don't want to do the work of men!" and men that think they're Parisians or Madrileños, "talking walks on the Prado, leaning against lampposts, or eating sorbets at Tortonis."

After the revolution, one of the first occasions homophobia went from a private attitude to public policy was during the National Meeting of Poets (Encuentro Nacional de Poetas) held in Camagüey in 1960 shortly before El Puente was begun. Colonel Alberto Bayo, a representative of the government, used the opportunity to launch an invective against homosexuals, calling them "bad seed," and warning they were going to "pervert the revolution." That night large placards appeared that said, "Fags, dykes, out!"

In 1965, the government set up concentration camps, euphemistically called Military Units to Aid Production (UMAP), where "social scum" (mostly gay men, but also Jehovah's Witnesses, and those perceived as disaffected) were interned behind barbed wire and used as forced labor until the UMAPs ended in 1967. Echoing the slogan on the gates of Auschwitz (and ironically, José Martí), the camps were emblazoned with the words: "Work will make you men."

== Ginsberg and gay scapegoating ==
As social pressures intensified, and El Puente become increasingly well known, members of the group began to draw more and more attention from state security. In 1964, Ana María Simo was jailed for several weeks and interrogated.

The openly gay men in the group, such as José Mario, started being regularly detained, targeted for their homosexuality, but also because they read the wrong books (Gide), listened to the wrong music (The Beatles) and once or twice had drunken scenes in the middle of the night. A couple of members were caught stealing library books.

In January 1965, Allen Ginsberg, the openly gay poet, Buddhist, and drug-user, was invited to the island by Casa de las Américas to be part of the jury for that year's poetry prize. Besides meeting writers such as Julio Cortázar, Mario Vargas Llosa, Camilo José Cela and Nicanor Parra, Ginsberg found his way to members of El Puente who had been corresponding with him, and intended to publish a translation of Howl.

"His visits to my house, and that we appeared together in various public places, like the Writers Union cafeteria and at a reception at the Casa de las Américas and his explosive declarations about current politics and the persecution of homosexuals, put us, as they say, on everybody's lips. We were grist for the rumor mill, and you know the power of rumors in a dictatorship, the power that they can have according to the intentions of the people that spread them. One day we were leaving a play at the Auditorium theater, that Ginsberg had invited us to, when Manolo (Manuel Ballagas, son of poet Emilio Ballagas), and I were brusquely detained in a street near the theater, thrown violently in a dark car, and taken to a police station. Some people that knew about the operation immediately told the administration of the Writers Union that came in person to the station. Nevertheless, the interrogations lasted all night--we were only let out in the morning. We were formally accused of the crime of 'consorting with foreigners.' In a matter of days, Ginsberg was expelled from the country."

Though on that occasion charges were dropped, afterwards, publishing and distributing were increasingly difficult for El Puente, which was already falling apart from internal and external pressures. José Mario moved back into his parents' house, and rarely stepped into the street where he was vulnerable: "They detained me 17 times." Books at the printers were confiscated, and finally, "the publisher was abruptly closed by governmental authorities."

== El Caimán vs. El Puente ==
Harassment peaked in 1966 after the group had already ceased publication, when El Puente was publicly attacked by Jesús Díaz, an editor of El Caimán Barbudo, a literary magazine created and funded by the Communist Youth. Unlike El Puente, they were straight, mostly men, almost all white, and largely recruited from the university. Jesus Diaz was an assistant professor.

He used the La Gaceta, a magazine of the Writers Union, to publicly declare that members of El Puente were "generally bad as artists" but, more dangerously, "the most dissolute and negative segment of their generation" and "a politically and aesthetically erroneous phenomenon."

Coming just a few months after the internment of gay men had officially begun, his statement was a shock to the group. "They declared a war of extermination on us." A week after Diaz' first attack appeared, José Mario was summoned to a concentration camp.

In El Puente's response, written and signed by Ana María Simo, she defended the merits of El Puente, and called Diaz's statement an "acto de delación intelectual" an "intellectualized denunciation".

Jesús Diaz published a long rebuttal, repeating his attack, and personally taking aim at Ana María Simo as well. Years later, Jesús Díaz, who himself left the island for Spain, blamed it on the age, and literary quarrels, "Nevertheless... I recognize what I did and I'd like to offer my regrets to Ana María Simo and other authors that could have felt attacked by me at that time."

Guillermo Rodríguez Rivera, another one of the editors, later defended El Caimán, blaming the Communist Youth for forbidding them, "to publish any young writer or artist which was homosexual. It wasn't a decision that we made at the magazine…"

== Sequel ==
After the exchange with El Caimán, and the internment of José Mario, the work of El Puente was largely erased. Some members emigrated, and those who remained were "endiablados", demonized. For decades, Nancy Morejón was hesitant to speak out in groups: "I thought if I raised my hand to say something, somebody would be sure to say, "Shut up, those people from El Puente..." I can tell you that now, but before we didn't talk about these things..."

Scholars have begun to research the group, and in its July–August 2005 issue, the Gaceta de Cuba published a series of related pieces in a first attempt to grapple with the history of El Puente. Since then, other books have appeared, including the Dinámicas culturales de los años 60 en Cuba y otras zonas creativas de conflicto (Doctoral Dissertation; 2007) and Ediciones El Puente y los vacíos del canon literario cubano (2016), both by María Isabel Alfonso, and the 2011 work Ediciones El Puente en la Habana de los años 60: Lecturas críticas y libros de poesía, edited and introduced by Jesús J. Barquet.

José Mario died in Madrid in 2002.

== Publications ==
Below is the list of El Puente books in order of publication between 1961 and 1965 in Havana, under the direction of José Mario and co-direction of Ana María Simo, as compiled by José Mario in "La verídica historía de Ediciones El Puente, La Habana, 1961–1965".

- José Mario, La Conquista (poems)
- Santiago Ruiz, Hiroshima (poems)
- Mercedes Cortázar, El Largo Canto (poems)
- Silvia, 27 pulgadas de vacío (poems)
- José Mario, De la Espera y el Silencio (poems)
- Gerardo Fulleda León, Algo en la Nada (poems)
- José Mario, Clamor Agudo (poems)
- Ana Justina, Silencio (poems)
- Guillermo Cuevas Carrión, Ni un Sí ni un No (stories)
- José Mario, Obras para niños (drama, 1st and 2nd ed.)
- Ana María Simo, Las fábulas (stories)
- Reinaldo Felipe, Acta (poem)
- Manuel Granados, El orden presentido (poems)
- José Mario, A través (poems)
- Nancy Morejón, Mutismos (poems)
- Mariano Rodríguez Herrera, La mutación (stories)
- Novísima Poesía Cubana I (poetry anthology)
- Georgina Herrera, GH (poems)
- Joaquín G. Santana, Poemas en Santiago (poems)
- Belkis Cuza Malé, Tiempos del Sol (poems)
- Rogelio Martínez Furé, Poesía Yoruba (poetry anthology)
- Jesús Abascal, Soroche y otros cuentos (stories)
- Nicolás Dorr, (drama)
- J. R. Brene, Santa Camila de la Habana Vieja (drama)
- José Mario, La torcida raíz de tanto daño (poems)
- Miguel Barnet, Isla de güijes (poems)
- Ada Abdo, Mateo y las sirenas (stories)
- Évora Tamayo, Cuentos para abuelas enfermas (stories)
- Nancy Morejón, Amor, ciudad atribuida (poems)
- Ana Garbinski, Osaín de un pie (poems)
- Rodolfo Hinostroza, Consejeros del Lobo (poems)
- Segunda Novísima de Poesía Cubana (1)
- Silvia Barros, Teatro infantil (drama)
- Primera Novísima de Teatro (2)
- Angel Luis Fernández Guerra, La nueva noche (stories)
- El Puente, Resumen Literario I (literary review) (3)
- Antonio Álvarez, Noneto (stories)
- José Milián, Mani Omi Omo (drama)
- José Mario, Muerte del Amor por la Soledad (poems)

Pending publication:

- El Puente, Resumen Literario II (literary review) (4)
- Manuel Ballagas, Con temor (stories) (5)

(1), (2), (3), (4) (5). Books confiscated at the printers used by Ediciones el Puente in 1965, Havana, Cuba.

== See also ==
- LGBT rights in Cuba
- El Mejunje
