= Pamela Sneed =

American poet and artist

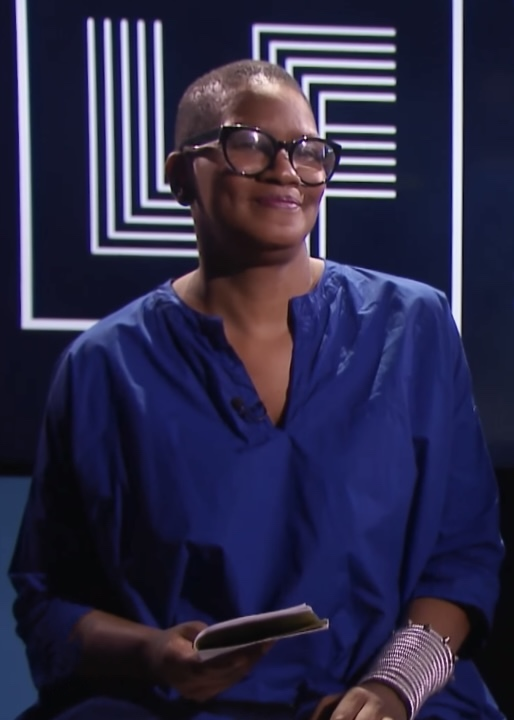
- Sneed reads on The Laura Flanders Show in 2018
- Born: 1964 (age 61–62); Boston, Massachusetts
- Education: The New School; Long Island University
- Notable work: Funeral Diva
- Awards: Lambda Literary Award

Pamela Sneed is an American poet, performance artist, actress, activist, and teacher. Her book, Funeral Diva, is a memoir in poetry and prose about growing up during the AIDS crisis, and the winner of the 2021 Lambda Literary Award for lesbian poetry.

== Education ==
Sneed earned a Bachelor of Arts degree from Lang College at The New School and a Masters of Fine Arts degree in New Media Art and Performance in 2008 at Long Island University.

== Performances ==
Sneed has held readings and performances at Center Stage at the Studio Museum in Harlem, P.S. 122, Creative Time @ The Brooklyn Anchorage, Exit Art, Lincoln Center Ex-Teresa in Mexico City, The Institute of Contemporary Arts in London, The Centre for Contemporary Arts in Glasgow, Scotland, The Green Room in Manchester, England, and Literatur Werkstat in Berlin. She also headlined the New Work Now Festival at Joe’s Pub/Public Theater in 2005. In 2018 she was a presenter at the 30th Annual Lambda Literary Awards. In 2024 she directed and starred in a performance in tribute to Big Mama Thornton at Joe's Pub at the Public Theater in New York City, for which she received a Creative Capital grant.

Sneed was also involved in Dyke TV, a nationally broadcast grassroots lesbian television program, from its inception in 1993. She appeared weekly on the show as the presenter for the arts segment until 1996.

In 2016, Sneed appeared in the live visuals for musician Anohni's song "Execution" on the HOPELESSNESS World Tour.

== Academic career ==
An out lesbian, Sneed taught voice, performance, and autobiographical writing at Long Island University. In 2012-2014 she taught writing for solo performance and solo performance at Sarah Lawrence College. She was the 2017 visiting critic at Yale and at Columbia University, and has been an adjunct assistant professor at the Columbia University School of the Arts. As of 2023, Sneed is an online lecturer in the School of the Art Institute of Chicago's low-residency Master of Fine Arts program.

Sneed has mentored other writers, including a pairing with poet Tommy Pico in the 2011-2012 inaugural year of the Queer/Art/Mentors program founded by the filmmaker Ira Sachs. She has subsequently mentored Heather Lynn Johnson (2016-2017) and Erica Cardwell in the 2020-2021 cycle.

== Funeral Diva (2020) ==
Sneed's memoir, Funeral Diva, a poetry and prose book was published by City Lights Publishers in 2020. The book documents growing up in the midst of the AIDS crisis, and focuses specifically on the experiences of Black queer women.

The book won the 2021 Lambda Literary Award for lesbian poetry.

== Bibliography ==
=== Memoir ===
- Funeral Diva (City Lights Publishers, 2020)

=== Poetry ===
- Imagine Being More Afraid of Freedom Than Slavery (Henry Holt, 1998)
- "Kong," anthologized in The Best Monologues from Best American Short Plays, edited by William W. Demastes (Applause, 2006; 2013)
- KONG And Other Works (Vintage Entity Press, 2009)
- "Parable of the Sower," anthologized in The 100 Best African American Poems, edited by Nikki Giovanni (Sourcebooks, 2010)
- Lincoln (2014)
- "Survivor 2014," anthologized in Nepantla: An Anthology of Queer Poets of Color, edited by Christopher Solo (Nightboat Books, 2018)
- "Born Frees," published on Poets.org (2019)
- "Never Again," published on Poets.org (2020)
- "I Can't Breathe," published on Poets.org (2020)
