= The Incomparable Rose Hartman =

2016 documentary film

The Incomparable Rose Hartman is a 2016 documentary film which explores the career of photographer Rose Hartman
