= Anne-christine d'Adesky =

American journalist and activist

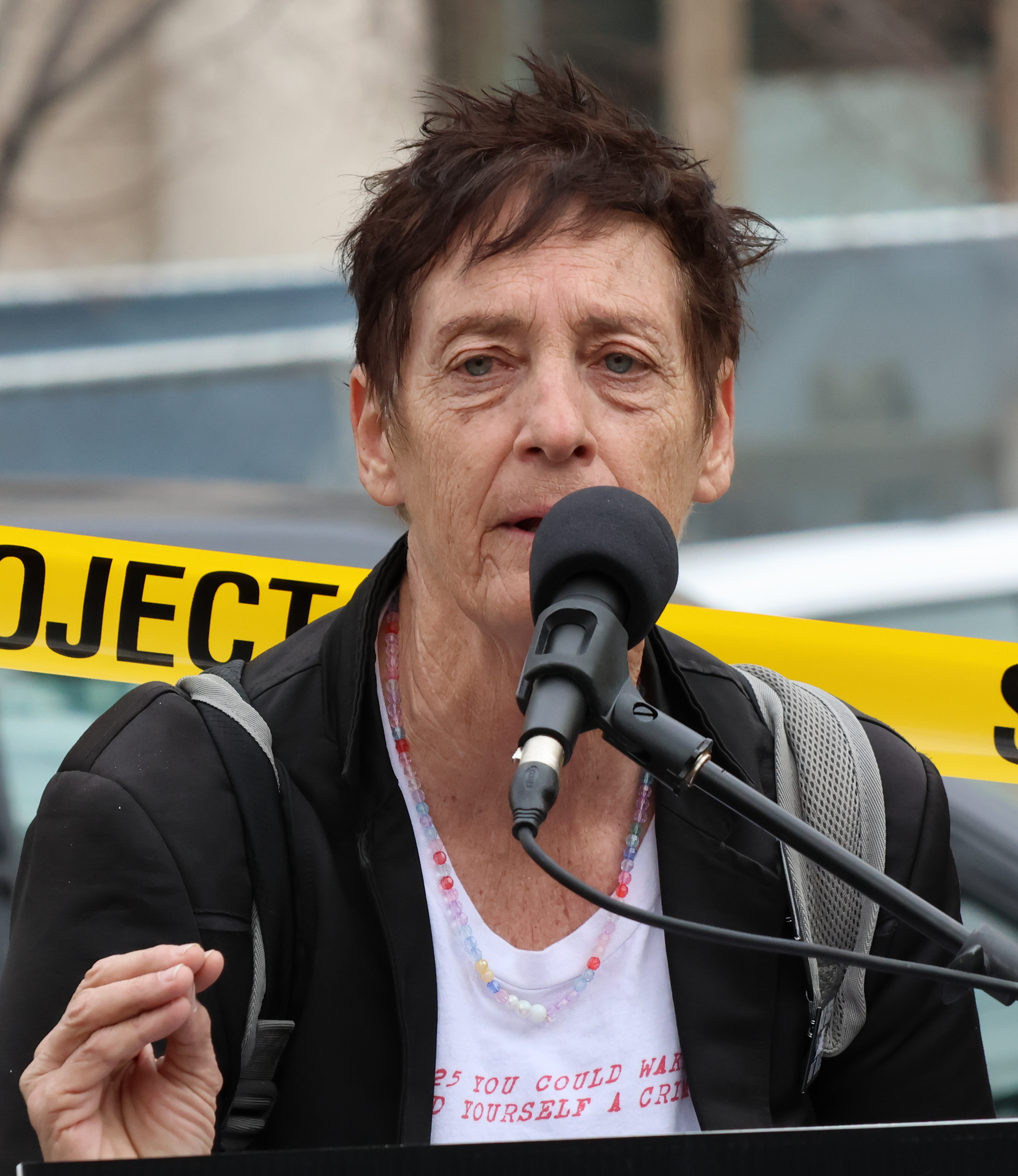
- Speaking at a protest, 2024
- Education: Barnard College; Columbia University

Anne-christine d'Adesky is an American author, journalist and activist of French and Haitian descent living in New York. She has maintained a deep relationship with Haiti, reporting the 2010 earthquake from a feminist angle, especially noting the impact of the disaster on the lives of teenage girls. She has also contributed to humanitarian projects in East Africa, as well as conducting extensive research into HIV/AIDS and its treatment worldwide.

== Early life and education ==
D'Adesky's father was born in Haiti, where the family's roots go back far. She spent her childhood summers there and still has extended family living there. Her mother was French. D'Adesky earned a master's degree in journalism from Columbia University Graduate School of Journalism in 1982 and a bachelor's degree from Barnard College in New York City in 1979.

As a journalist, d'Adesky has been a magazine and newspaper journalist. She was a foreign correspondent in Haiti working as a stringer for The San Francisco Examiner and The Village Voice. She wrote about HIV/AIDS for various newspapers, including the New York Native and In These Times, and later, magazines including The Advocate.

== Career and activism ==
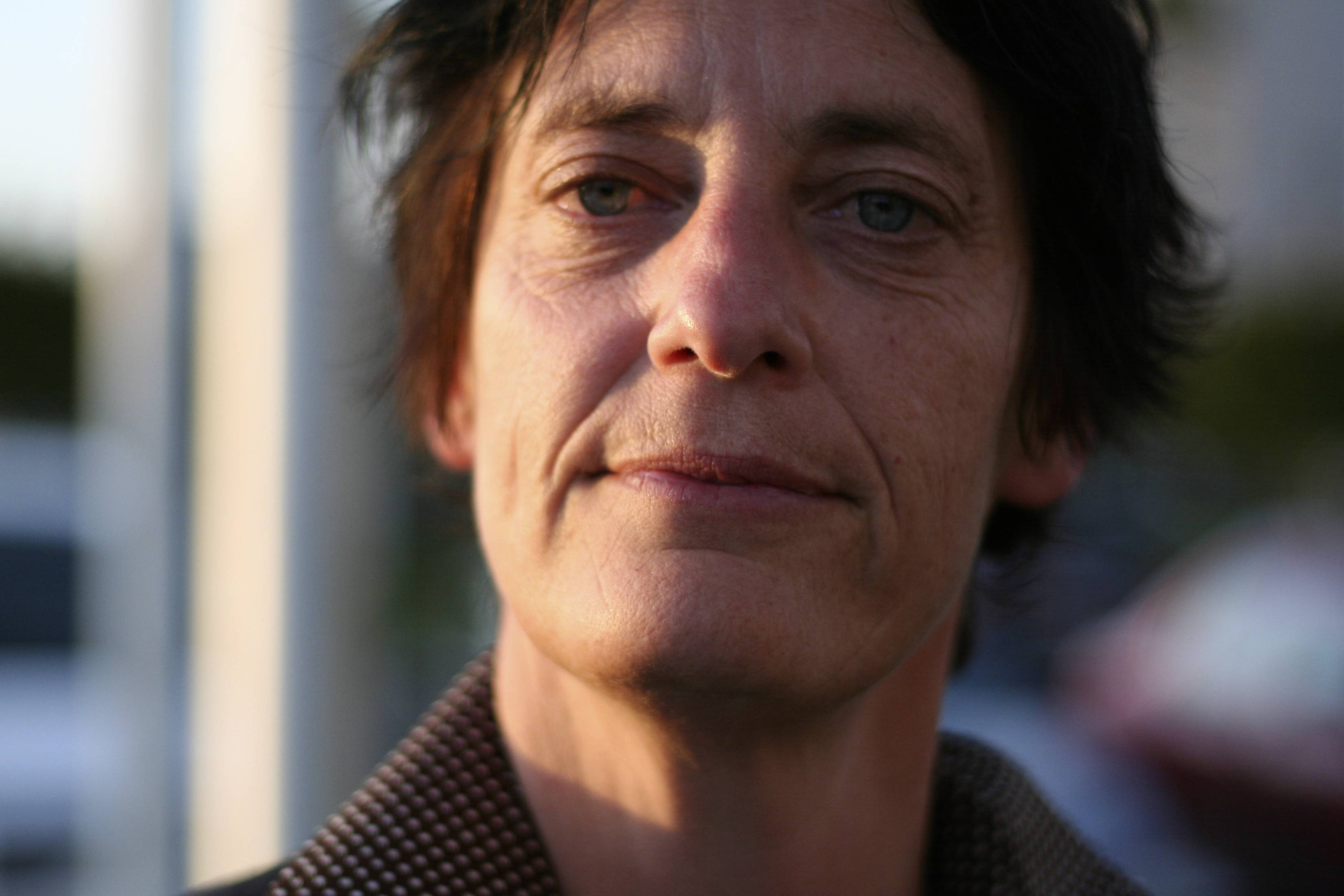
Anne-christine d'Adesky (Santa Clara, California, 2007)

In 1983, she attended the Seneca Women's Encampment for a Future of Peace and Justice, where she protested the presence of nuclear cruise missiles on US soil. She was an early member of ACT UP who participated in the first Wall Street protest, and other famous actions, demanding faster access to life-saving HIV medications, and later, access to HIV drugs for people living in poor countries.

D'Adesky was one of the six founders of the Lesbian Avengers, which began in New York City in 1992 as "a direct action group focused on issues vital to lesbian survival and visibility."

D'Adesky was senior editor at Out magazine in the mid-1990s in charge of health coverage, and also wrote investigative features and long-form profiles. In 1998, she launched HIV Plus magazine, where she served as founding editor in chief for two years before the magazine was sold to The Advocate. She then turned to writing a series on global AIDS for the newsletter of amfAR, The Foundation for AIDS Research. She also wrote about AIDS for magazines such as SEED and The Nation, newspapers such as The San Francisco Examiner, and health agencies such as the World Health Organization.

In 2003, she co-produced Pills, Profits, Protest: Chronicle of the Global AIDS Movement, a documentary about global AIDS treatment activism.

In 2003, d'Adesky began humanitarian work in Africa, focusing on the issue of gender-based violence linked to HIV/AIDS and the use of rape in war in East Africa. She launched and served as co-founder and co-executive director of a global initiative WE-ACTx, based in San Francisco and Kigali, that helps Rwandan women affected by HIV/AIDS who are survivors of genocidal rape, and orphans. WE-ACTx has provided free, comprehensive care to thousands of HIV-positive Rwandan women and children, and is today an all-Rwandan run program operating two clinics in Kigali. D'Adesky stepped down as co-Executive Director in 2008 to become a board member. In 2010, d'Adesky flew to Haiti in the immediate aftermath of the January 10th earthquake, where she has longtime family roots. She began reporting for World Pulse and the Global Post, and launched a blog on the post-quake humanitarian response, Pox Vox. She also founded a feminist coalition with Haitian and diaspora women activists, PotoFanm+Fi (Women and Girls Pillar, in Haitian Creole), to promote the role, needs and voice of Haitian women in the rebuilding effort. In 2011 she launched the offshoot Haiti-based group, PotoFi (Girls Pillar) and worked to document the gender dimensions of the earthquake and its impact on adolescent girls. She released a report in 2011 with PotoFi showing that teenage Haitian girls bore a disproportionate brunt of the disaster, evidenced by a tide of unplanned, early pregnancies linked to sexual violence, and a survival-based entry into prostitution, and displacement.

From 2013 to 2015, d'Adesky served as the Global Coordinator for Haiti for the V-Day "One Billion Rising" worldwide campaign against sexual violence. She helped organize a major Mardi Gras Carnaval float on gender justice in 2014 and led a grassroots effort to reduce the risk of rape and assaults during this annual event, to great success. With PotoFi, she also organized forums across Haiti on sexual violence and adolescents. In 2014, she organized a historic French/Haitian Creole production of The Vagina Monologues at Haiti's Parliament, and a year later a major outdoor feminist event that included a free production of the play in the capital that drew a crowd of 6,000 people.

D'Adesky continues to advocate and report on Haiti, sexual violence and human rights issues, with a fresh focus on LGBT and women's asylum /refugee issues for various periodicals, including Pride Magazine. In 2017, she published a 1990s AIDS activist memoir, The Pox Lover: An Activist's Decade in New York and Paris, which was nominated for a Lambda Literary Award.

== Bibliography ==
- 2017 The Pox Lover: An Activist's Decade in New York and Paris (University of Wisconsin Press)
- 2014 Beyond Shock: Charting the Landscape of Sexual Violence in post-Quake Haiti (USCB CEBS, ppbk 2014); POD E-book, Amazon 2014.
- 2004 Moving Mountains: The Race to Treat Global AIDS (Verso, updated, ppbk 2006)
- 1994 Under the Bone (Farrar, Straus & Giroux)

== Filmography ==
- 2003 Pills, Profits, and Protest (documentary)

== Nominations ==
- 1998 Pulitzer Prize for Investigative Reporting nomination
- 1998 George Polk Award nomination, Best Foreign Reporting
- 2007 Amfar Awards of Courage Honoree, inaugural award for Public Service Journalism
- 2018 Lambda Literary Award finalist for "The Pox Lover" memoir

Biographical Subject:

- 2014. Biographical subject in documentary film about women in the AIDS activist movement by Emmanuelle Antolin (in progress)
- 2004. Biographical subject in AIDS activism archival documentary project.
- 1997. Biographical subject in Framing Silence academic book about Haitian women writers by author Myriam Chancy.
