= Kids of Today =

Kids of Today (French: Des jeunes gens modernes) is a 2011 "faux rockumentary" directed by the French filmmaker Jérôme de Missolz. The film explores, using a non-linear storyline, the late-1970s French music scene along with contemporary counterculture.
