= Murders of Hattie Mae Cohens and Brian Mock =

1992 murder in Salem, Oregon

- Date: September 26, 1992
- Location: Salem, Oregon, U.S.
- Deaths: 2
- Injuries: 5

On September 26, 1992, Hattie Mae Cohens and Brian Mock were killed by a firebomb attack at their apartment in Salem, Oregon.

As Cohens was a lesbian, and Mock was gay, the attack was seen by the Salem LGBTQ community as motivated by homophobia which had been encouraged by advocates of Ballot Measure 9. Some also saw the attack as racially motivated, as Cohens and other residents of the apartment building were African American. Four white supremacist skinheads, aged 19 to 22, were arrested in connection with the killings, and charged with murder, aggravated murder, assault, arson, and intimidation; during the trial, one pled guilty to aggravated murder, one was acquitted of all charges, and two were found guilty of murder, assault, arson, and racial intimidation.

== Attack ==
According to witnesses, Cohens had been involved in a feud with the four skinheads. Cohens' nephew had been called racial epithets by at least one of the perpetrators in the weeks before the attack. A few weeks prior to the firebombing, Mock had been attacked by a group of men, whom witnesses said called him homophobic epithets. There was not enough evidence to prosecute the crime, so Cohens and two of her friends tracked down the leader of the attack and beat him up.

A teenage witness reported that a large group of skinheads had visited the apartment on September 25, and that a fight had broken out at the time. According to the Bay Area Reporter, the fight was related to the prior attack on Mock and Cohens' defense of him.

In the early hours of September 26, two bottles filled with gasoline, the first thrown by Sean Edwards, were thrown into Cohens and Mock's basement apartment in northeast Salem. A fire started, which trapped Cohens in her bedroom, where she died of smoke inhalation. Mock and six other building residents were injured, and he died in the hospital on September 27.

== Victims ==
Hattie Mae Cohens, a black lesbian woman, was 29 at the time of the attack. According to Seattle Gay News, she was described as "boisterous...with a great sense of humor and a quick temper" and as "can-do kind of dyke". Brian H. Mock, a white gay man, was 45 at the time. Mock had an intellectual disability and was described as having a "gentle demeanor". Mock was frequently beaten up due to his orientation and disability, and he had moved in with his friend, Cohens, for protection.

== Aftermath ==
At the time of the attack, the Salem LGBTQ community was concerned about the upcoming elections and Ballot Measure 9. The measure would have, among other things, prevented organizations which "promoted homosexuality" from receiving government funding, removed books "promoting homosexuality" from schools and libraries, and prevented anti-discrimination laws from including sexual orientation. In this context, Cohens and Mock were claimed as "martyrs" by the No on 9 Committee (which was organized to oppose Measure 9), and members of the Salem LGBTQ community claimed that advocates of Measure 9, such as the Christian Coalition and the Oregon Citizens Alliance, were responsible for Cohens and Mock's deaths, due to the homophobia in their campaign messaging. Fears that other extremists would be emboldened by the firebombing and that the violence might spread further were not borne out.

Community members held a candlelit vigil at Cohens and Mock's apartment. According to several attendees, several pro-Ballot Measure 9 advocates came to the vigil and "jeered" the mourners.

The attack led to demonstrations by groups such as ACT UP Columbia, in Portland on October 17, 1992, and by the newly-formed Lesbian Avengers. The group staged a dyke march and ate fire in New York City in October 1992 and in front of the White House in 1993 to draw attention to the murders of Cohens and Mock. During their event in New York, they also erected a shrine to the two in Greenwich Village.

== Investigation and trial ==
Following the attack, three people - Yolanda R. Cotton (19), Sean R. Edwards (21), and Philip B. Wilson Jr. (20) - were arrested. Leon L. Tucker (22) was arrested a few days later. A total of 15 felonies were filed against the group, two of which were related to hate crime charges. The FBI was involved with the investigation of the crime. Initially, investigators assumed the firebombing was gang-related, although groups such as the National Gay Lesbian Task Force released statements in which they called the killings a hate crime.

According to police, although race and sexual orientation played a role in the motivations for the attack, they were not the primary motivations. However, witnesses said that the four had called Cohens and Mock homophobic and racial slurs. Four of the apartment's other residents were African-American, leading to further concerns that the attack was racially motivated.

=== Trial ===
All four of those originally arrested were brought to trial. Sean Edwards chose to plead guilty to his charge of aggravated murder, in hopes of a chance at parole. The other three pled not guilty. Jury selection for the trial began in February 1993.

During the trial, defense attorney Kevin Lafky called the incident "a sad, tragic collapse in judgment" influenced by alcohol consumption, while prosecutors framed the attack as intentional and based on racial and homophobic prejudices. Jurors listened to three weeks of testimony and deliberated for three days on the verdict.

In April 1993, Leon Tucker and Phillip Wilson Jr. were found guilty of murder, as well as assault, arson and racial intimidation, but were not found guilty of aggravated murder. Yolanda Cotton was acquitted of all charges.

Marion County Circuit Court Judge Albin Norblad sentenced Wilson to 35 years in prison, Tucker to 30 years in prison, and Edwards to 25 years in prison.

== Legacy ==
Cohens and Mock's deaths led to a tradition among the Lesbian Avengers, in which trained volunteers eat fire to show the LGBTQ community's strength and to pay tribute to those lost to homophobia.

== See also ==
- History of violence against LGBTQ people in the United States
- LGBTQ culture in Salem, Oregon
- LGBTQ rights in Oregon
- List of homicides in Oregon
- Murders of Roxanne Ellis and Michelle Abdill
- Racism in Oregon
