= Lesbian Avengers =

Lesbian direct action group in the US

The Lesbian Avengers was an American direct action group. The group was founded in 1992 in New York City by six individuals: Ana Maria Simo, Anne Maguire, Anne-Christine D'Adesky, Marie Honan, Maxine Wolfe, and Sarah Schulman.

The organization was formed to address lesbian issues and visibility through humorous and untraditional activism. The founding members of the Avengers, who had already been involved with women’s and gay rights activism, expressed frustration with the lack of diversity and the focus on white men in the gay rights movement and decided to create a movement for lesbians.

At the organization’s peak, there were over 60 chapters of the Lesbian Avengers in the United States, including in New York, San Francisco, and Denver. Different chapters of the Lesbian Avengers also expanded their missions to focus on issues of race, class, and gender.

One of their most notable accomplishments was the formation of the annual Dyke March, which began in 1993. They were also known to use fire breathing in their activism.

The Lesbian Avengers disbanded in 1997, though some groups continue to hold demonstrations, including the ongoing annual Dyke March.

== Origins ==
=== Founding ===
The Lesbian Avengers was founded by six women: Ana María Simo, Anne Maguire, Anne-christine d'Adesky, Marie Honan, Maxine Wolfe, and Sarah Schulman. Each of these women had experience in advocating for gay rights and equality under different organizations including ACT-UP and the Irish Lesbian and Gay Organization (ILGO). The co-founders sought to create an inclusive movement that focused on lesbian issues, which they felt were not properly addressed in other organizations.

Their first recruiting flyer, handed out at New York's Pride March, invited "LESBIANS! DYKES! GAY WOMEN!" to get involved.

The Lesbian Avenger handbook was a foundation for them to organize meetings, fundraise, and respond to media. The handbook "made it possible for lesbians across the world to start Avenger chapters without having a huge pool of experienced activists."

=== Growth ===
The New York chapter started with an estimated 50 members. Eventually new chapters were introduced in multiple locations and over 35 chapters emerged worldwide. The Avengers garnered attention through their demonstrations, flyers, and memorable catchphrases. A notable artist within the group was Carrie Moyer, an American painter who designed some of the posters and logos used by the group.

In 1993, the documentary film The Lesbian Avengers Eat Fire, Too was released, directed by Avengers Janet Baus and Su Friedrich. The film documents the first year of activity within the group and includes interviews with the members of the New York chapter.

== Actions ==
Cover of the Lesbian Avenger Handbook

The Lesbian Avenger Handbook, written by Sarah Schulman, paid particular attention to the visual elements of their demonstrations, stating that a demonstration “should let people know clearly and quickly who we are and why we are there."

In the early years, the group opposed attempts to legitimize gay marriage, protesting it at an Andrew Sullivan book signing in 1995.

The New York Lesbian Avengers also developed the Lesbian Avenger Civil Rights Organizing Project, which focused on grassroots activism, fighting homophobic initiatives, and training activists for the long-term.

=== Rainbow Curriculum ===
On their first action (September 9, 1992), the Lesbian Avengers targeted right-wing attempts to suppress the multicultural Children of the Rainbow curriculum for elementary schoolchildren. Meeting in a Queens school district where the opposition to the Rainbow Curriculum was strongest, they paraded through the neighborhood with an all-lesbian marching band to a local elementary school where they gave out lavender balloons to children and their parents saying "ask about lesbian lives". They also wore tee-shirts reading, "I was a lesbian child".

They also demonstrated without permits. Organizer Kelly Cogswell later elaborated on this principle during the 1994 International Dyke March: "We ask for a permit; they can say no."

Some members objected to going anywhere near children since lesbians and gay men had often been portrayed as child molesters. Other members thought that was precisely why their presence was essential, and this was the eventual consensus of the group.

=== Media ===
One article characterized them as "a protest outfit formed to attract media attention to lesbian causes." They had committees dedicated to outreach and propaganda.

Conflicts over the handling of the press coverage of the Dyke March also occurred within the New York gay and lesbian political community. In an interview, Simo said that a press release sent out by the Gay and Lesbian Alliance Against Defamation (GLAAD) after Stonewall 25 initially did not have anything in it about the Dyke March. After the Avengers brought this issue to GLAAD's attention, one line was added to the end of the press release about the lack of mainstream press coverage about the Dyke March.

They invaded the offices of Self magazine when that publication planned a trip to Colorado despite a lesbian and gay boycott of the state for hate legislation. In the resulting media coverage they were misnamed "The Lesbian Agenda".

The Avengers also collaborated with Las Buenas Amigas and African Ancestral Lesbians United for Societal Change in a series of actions against homophobic and racist radio programs at La Mega 97.9 in New York and its parent company, the Spanish Broadcasting System, informing advertisers, staging demonstrations, and briefly taking over the radio station to broadcast their own message.

=== Fire-eating ===
Fire eating became a symbol for the Lesbian Avengers and spread from the New York group to others. The first time the Avengers engaged in fire-breathing was on October 30, 1992, in New York. This was done in honor of Hattie Mae Cohens and Brian Mock, to "transform the image of their deaths by learning to eat fire." The New York Times, in one of its few articles on the Avengers, explained:

Last year, a lesbian and a gay man, Hattie Mae Cohens and Brian Mock, burned to death in Salem, Ore., after a Molotov cocktail was tossed into the apartment they shared. A month later, on Halloween, at a memorial to the victims in New York City, the Avengers (then newly organized) gave their response to the deaths. They ate fire, chanting, as they still do: "The fire will not consume us. We take it and make it our own."

At the Washington Dyke March held during the anniversary celebrations of the Lesbian and Gay March on Washington in 1993, the Lesbian Avengers ate fire in front of the White House surrounded by a crowd of an estimated 20,000 people.

=== The Dyke March ===
According to co-founder Sarah Schulman, "It was at the 1993 March on Washington that the Avengers and ACT-UP Women's Network created the first Dyke March – with 20,000 women, marching together with no permit. These participants brought the marches home to their cities and countries and created a new tradition." The New York chapter then held their own Dyke March in New York City, which led to marches across other cities nationally and internationally.

The marches still exist and are held in June for Pride Month.

== Chapters ==
=== New York Chapter ===
The New York Chapter was the beginning of the Lesbian Avengers. The Avengers in New York worked from 1992 to 1995. The first official action was a protest against right-wing opposition to New York's Rainbow Curriculum and their last action was protesting comments Joseph Bruno made toward the LGBT community. The actions taken by the New York Chapter were protests against politicians who made homophobic remarks, actions to increase lesbian visibility, and volunteer work across different organizations.

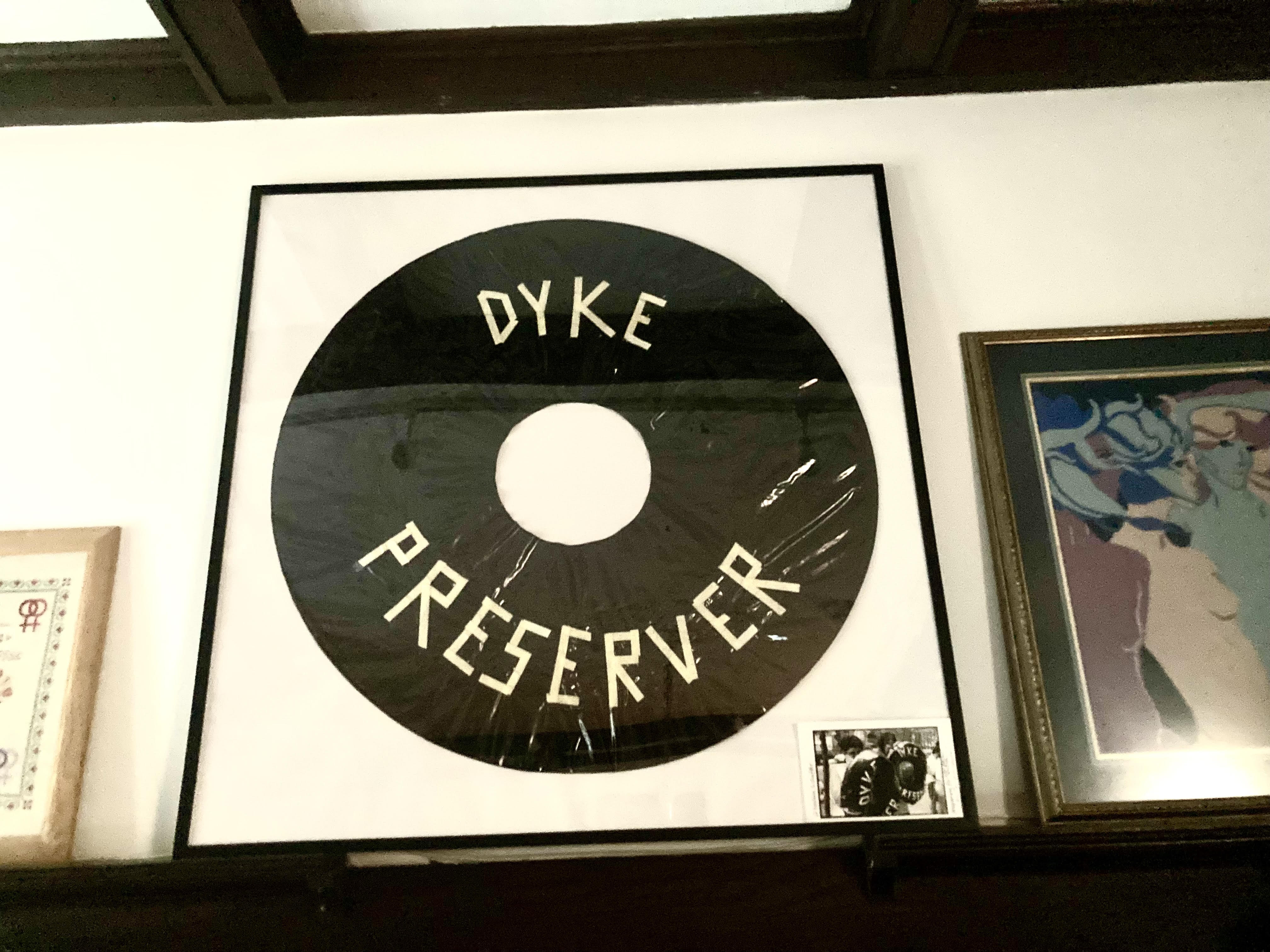
A "Dyke Preserver" used by the Lesbian Avengers in New York City in 1994.

The New York Chapter partnered with the New York City Anti-Violence Project to protest the violence that queer people were faced with during Halloween celebrations. Much of the activism the Avengers engaged in addressed the murders of gay people. One of their first protests was in response to the murders of Hattie Mae Cohens and Brian Mock, holding a press conference in New York City Hall to bring awareness to the situation. In 1994, the Avengers staged an action at the Alice Austen House in Staten Island, calling for the museum to recognize Austen's lesbian history.

=== San Francisco Chapter ===
The San Francisco Chapter of the Lesbian Avengers was founded in 1993 and was active until 1997. They held protests, brought awareness to the AIDS crisis, and organized events to mobilize lesbians.

A major action they took was in response to Exodus International and their use of conversion therapy. On February 9, 1995, a group of five Avengers entered the headquarters and demonstrated against the organization. The Avengers brought 1,000 crickets, which they released into the headquarters.

=== International chapters ===
There were Lesbian Avengers chapters located in cities within Canada, Europe, and Australia.

The most well-known international chapter was located in London, England. Many members of the London chapter were ex-members of the group OutRage!. Many of their actions aimed to increase lesbian visibility. Members re-created Romeo and Juliet with a full lesbian cast and protested homophobic groups and organizations across London.

== See also ==
- Lesbian erasure
- Off Our Backs
