= Le Sept =

Nigthclub in Paris

Coordinates: 48.8657°N 2.3351°E

Le Sept or Club Sept was a nightclub in Paris located at 7, rue Sainte-Anne. It was founded on December 18, 1968. It was one of the nightclubs where disco originated in France. It closed in 1980.
