= Façade (magazine) =

Façade was a French magazine, published in Paris and distributed internationally. Created in 1976 by Alain Benoist and Hervé Pinard, it appeared in the form of 14 issues, without date or periodicity, until 1983. Thirty years later, a fifteenth issue appeared, followed by a sixteenth in 2017.
