= Tea dance (gay event) =

Gay community event

Tea dances are events organized on Sunday afternoons in the US gay community, originating in New York in the 1950s and 1960s. The original dances included tea service. They were a place for singles to meet. The name alludes to traditional tea dances of the English countryside.

== History ==
It was illegal until the mid-1960s for bars in New York to sell alcohol to people known to be gay, and New York City police would conduct raids on establishments catering to them. Hence, gay men in the area began to hold tea dances outside the city as an alternative venue for meeting. In New York, these generally took place on Fire Island, in Cherry Grove and the Pines, on Sunday afternoons. Serving tea rather than alcohol made them more acceptable and less law-defying. Because they were held in the afternoon, attendees could catch a ferry and return home and be ready to work on Monday morning.

Tea dances spread beyond New York and lasted into the 1990s and beyond, regularly taking place in Miami, Fort Lauderdale, Provincetown, and Los Angeles and San Francisco, among other cities.

As gay people became more accepted and legally protected, the tea dances were subsumed into nighttime club events such as circuit parties, although have recently seen a resurgence, particularly at gay vacation destinations such as Provincetown and Fire Island.

== See also ==
- Molly house
