= Visual art of the United States =

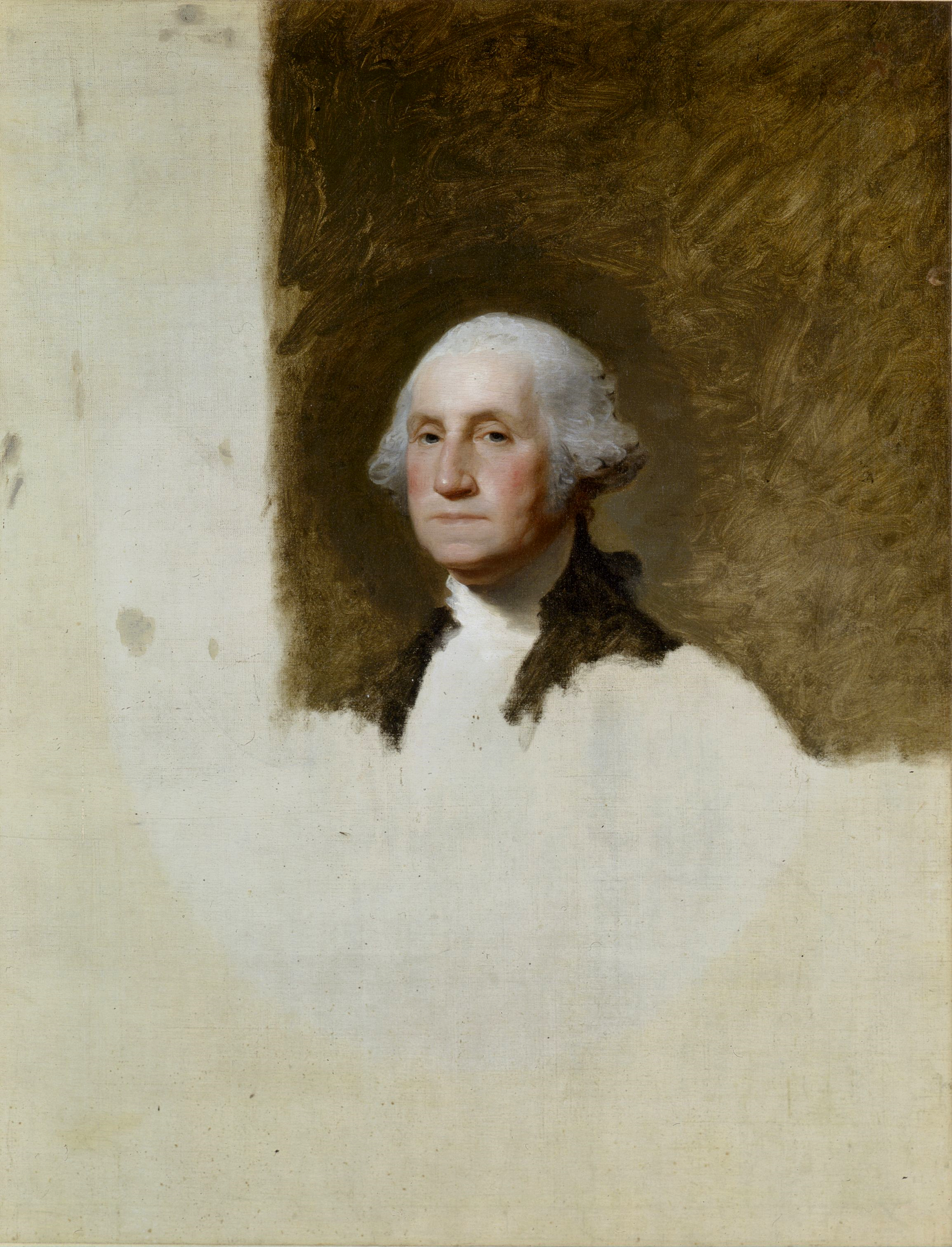
Gilbert Stuart, Athenaeum Portrait, also known as George Washington and The Unfinished Portrait, 1796, Museum of Fine Arts, Boston, is his most celebrated and famous work.

Visual art of the United States or American art is visual art made in the United States or by U.S. artists. Before colonization, there were many flourishing traditions of Native American art, and where the Spanish colonized, Spanish Colonial architecture and the accompanying styles in other media were quickly established. Early colonial art on the East Coast initially relied on artists from Europe, with John White the earliest example. In the late 18th and early 19th centuries, artists primarily painted portraits and some landscapes in a style based mainly on English painting. Furniture makers imitating English styles and similar craftsmen were established in the major cities, but in the English colonies locally made pottery remained resolutely utilitarian until the 19th century, with fancy products imported.

In the late 18th century two U.S. artists, Benjamin West and John Singleton Copley, became the most successful painters in London of history painting, then regarded as the highest form of art, giving the first sign of an emerging force in Western art. American artists who remained in the U.S. became increasingly skilled, although there was little awareness of them in Europe. In the early 19th century the infrastructure to train artists began to be established, and from 1820 the Hudson River School began to produce Romantic landscape painting that were original and matched the huge scale of U.S. landscapes. The American Revolution produced a demand for patriotic art, especially history painting, while other artists recorded the frontier country. A parallel development taking shape in rural U.S. was the American craft movement, which began as a reaction to the Industrial Revolution.

After 1850 Academic art in the European style flourished, and as richer Americans became very wealthy, the flow of European art, new and old, to the U.S. began; this has continued ever since. Museums opened to display much of this. Developments in modern art in Europe came to the U.S. from exhibitions in New York City such as the Armory Show in 1913. After World War II, New York replaced Paris as the center of the art world. Since then many U.S. movements have shaped Modern and Postmodern art. Art in the United States today covers a huge range of styles.

== Beginnings ==
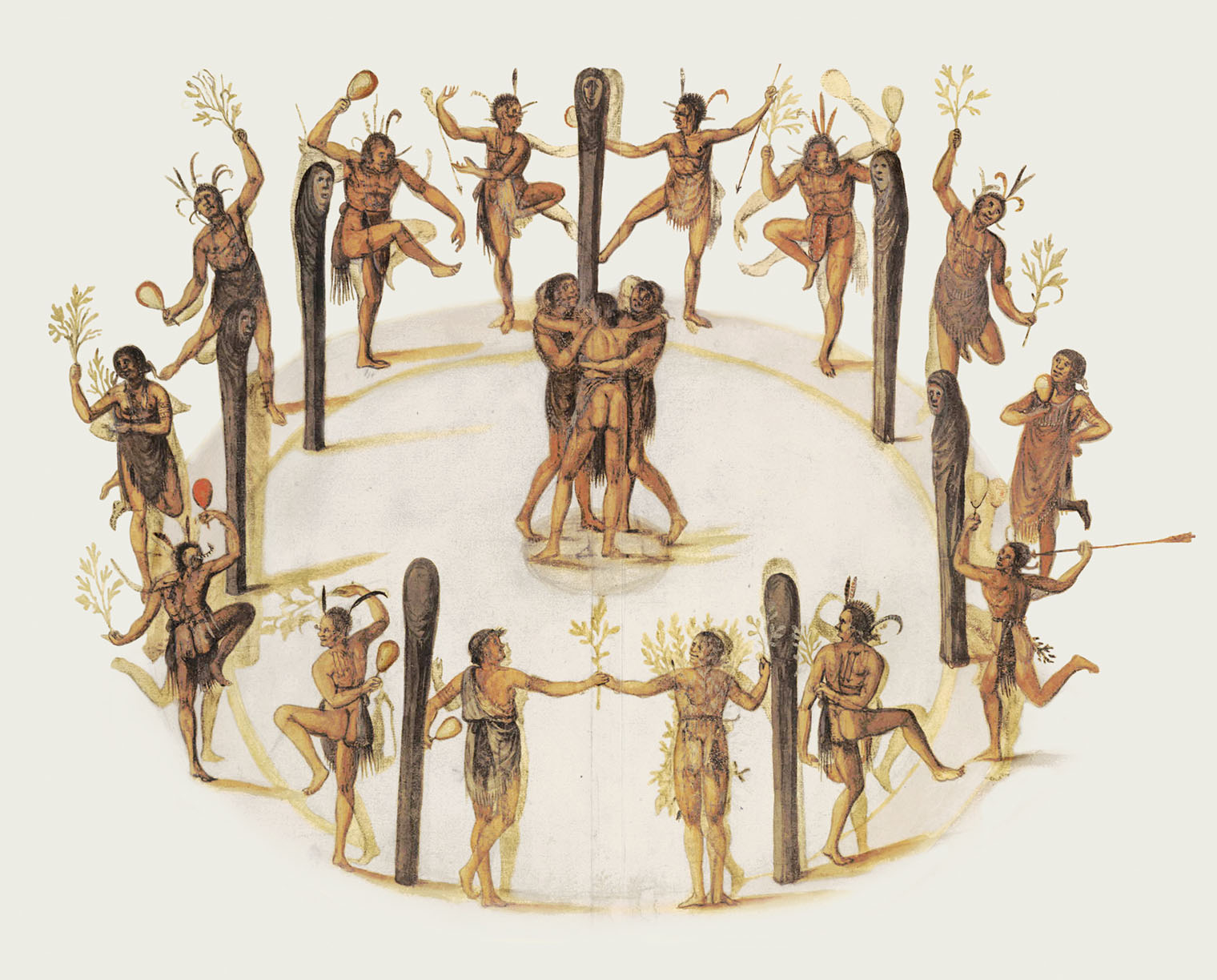
John White, Roanoke Indians, 1585, watercolor, British Museum

One of the first European artists to visit North America was John White, who made important watercolor records of Native American life on the Eastern seaboard (now in the British Museum). White first visited America as the artist and map-maker for an expedition of exploration, and in the early years of the Colonial period most other artists trained in Western styles were officers in the army and navy, whose training included sketching landscapes. Eventually the English settlements grew large enough to support professional artists, mostly portrait-painters, often largely self-taught.

Among the earliest was John Smybert, a trained artist from London who emigrated in 1728 intending to be a professor of fine art but instead became a portrait painter and printseller in Boston. His friend Peter Pelham was a painter and printmaker. Both needed other sources of income and had shops. Meanwhile, the Spanish territories later to be American could see mostly religious art in the late Baroque style, mostly by Native artists, and Native American cultures continued to produce art in their various traditions.

== 18th century ==
John Trumbull, The Declaration of Independence (event 1776, painted 1819), United States Capitol rotunda, Washington, D.C.

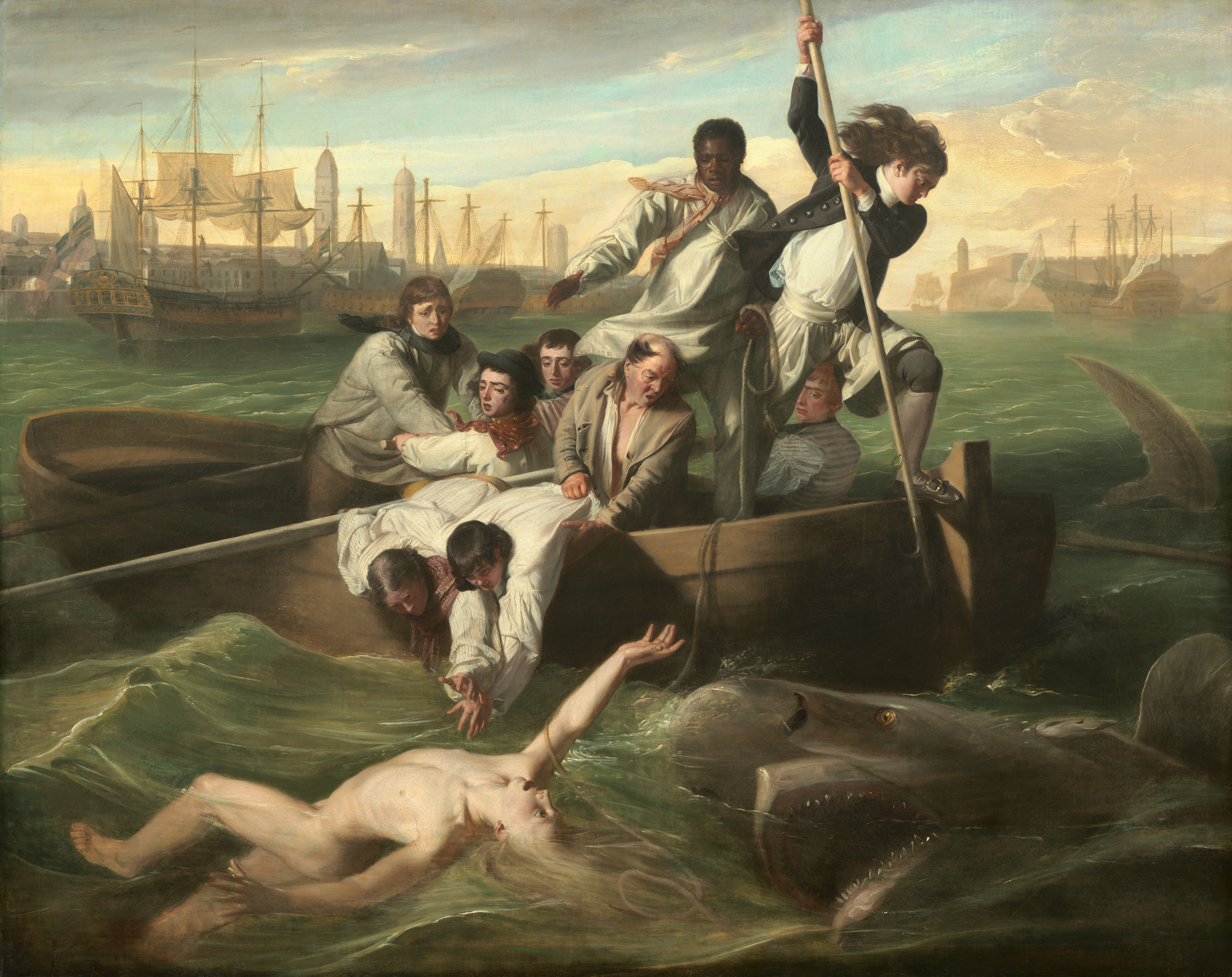
John Singleton Copley, Watson and the Shark, (original version), 1778, National Gallery of Art, Washington, D.C.

After the Declaration of Independence in 1776, which marked the official beginning of the American national identity, the nation needed a history, and part of that history would be expressed visually. Most of early American art (from the late 18th century through the early 19th century) consists of history painting and especially portraits. As in Colonial America, many of the painters who specialized in portraits were essentially self-taught; notable among them are Joseph Badger, John Brewster Jr., and William Jennys. The young nation's artists generally emulated the style of British art, which they knew through prints and the paintings of English-trained immigrants such as John Smibert and John Wollaston.

Robert Feke, an untrained painter of the colonial period, achieved a sophisticated style based on Smibert's example. Charles Willson Peale, who gained much of his earliest art training by studying Smibert's copies of European paintings, painted portraits of many of the important figures of the American Revolution. Peale's younger brother James Peale and six of Peale's nieces and sons— Anna Claypoole Peale, Sarah Miriam Peale, Raphaelle Peale, Rembrandt Peale, Rubens Peale and Titian Peale—were also artists. Painters such as Gilbert Stuart made portraits of the newly elected government officials, which became iconic after being reproduced on various U.S. postage stamps of the 19th century and early 20th century.

John Singleton Copley painted emblematic portraits for the increasingly prosperous merchant class, including a portrait of Paul Revere (c. 1768–1770). The original version of his most famous painting Watson and the Shark (1778) is in the collection of The National Gallery of Art. Benjamin West painted portraits as well as history paintings of the French and Indian War. West also worked in London where many American artists studied under him, including Washington Allston, Ralph Earl, James Earl, Samuel Morse, Charles Willson Peale, Rembrandt Peale, Gilbert Stuart, John Trumbull, Mather Brown, Edward Savage and Thomas Sully. John Trumbull painted large battle scenes of the Revolutionary War. When landscape was painted it was most often done to show how much property a subject owned, or as a picturesque background for a portrait.

=== Selection of works by early American artists ===
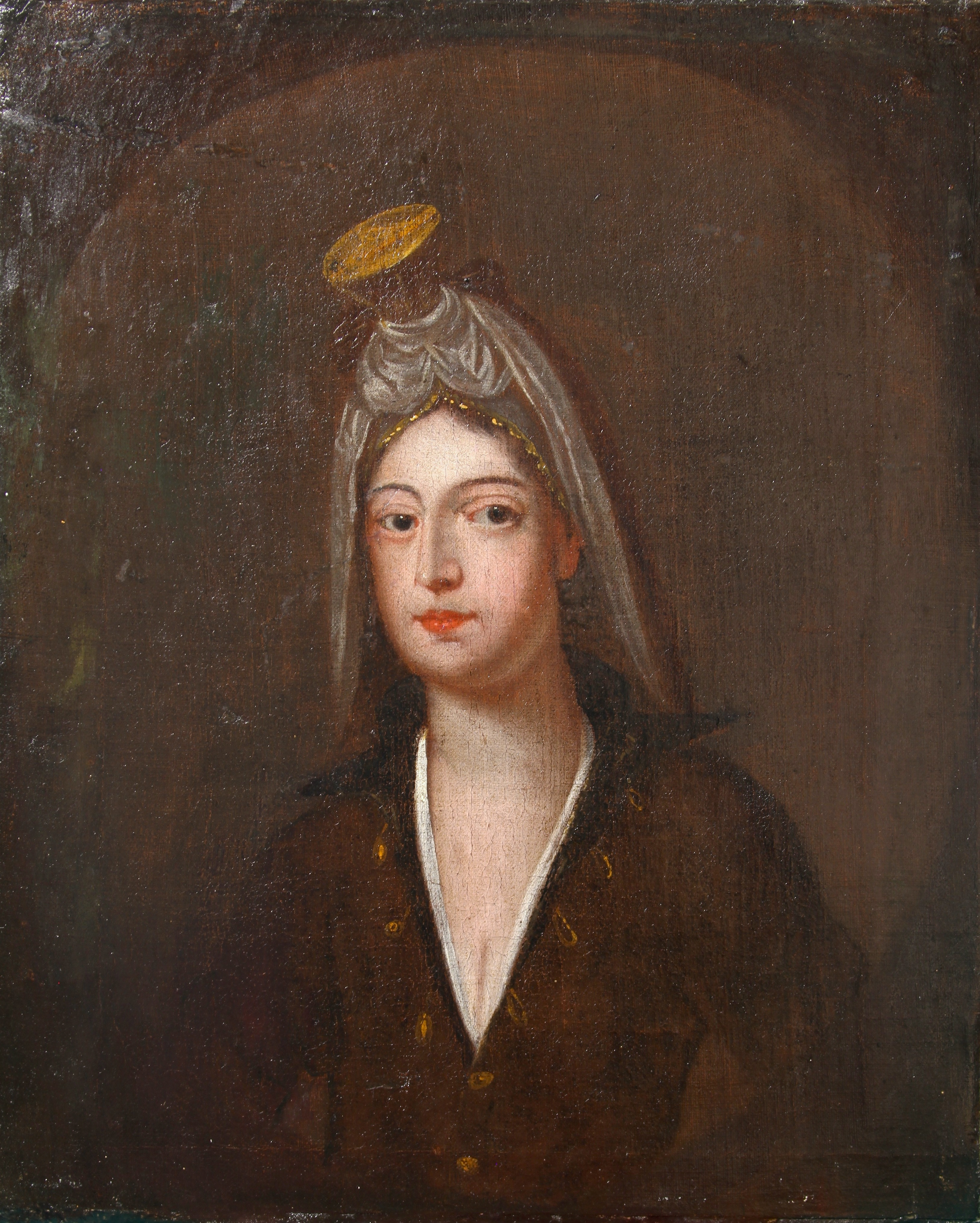
Jeremiah Theus Portrait of Lady Liberty, 1765

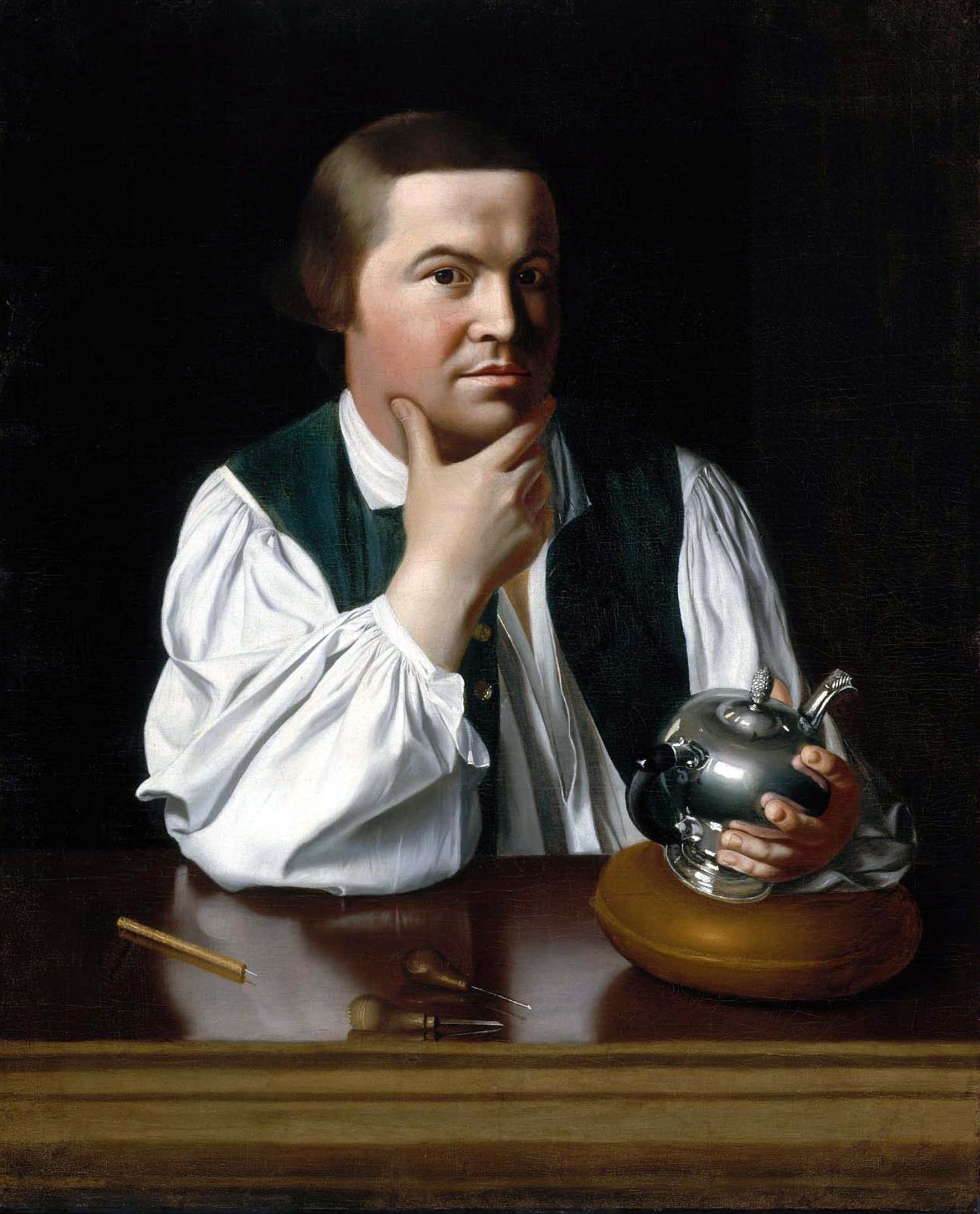
John Singleton Copley, Paul Revere, c. 1768–1770, Museum of Fine Arts in Boston

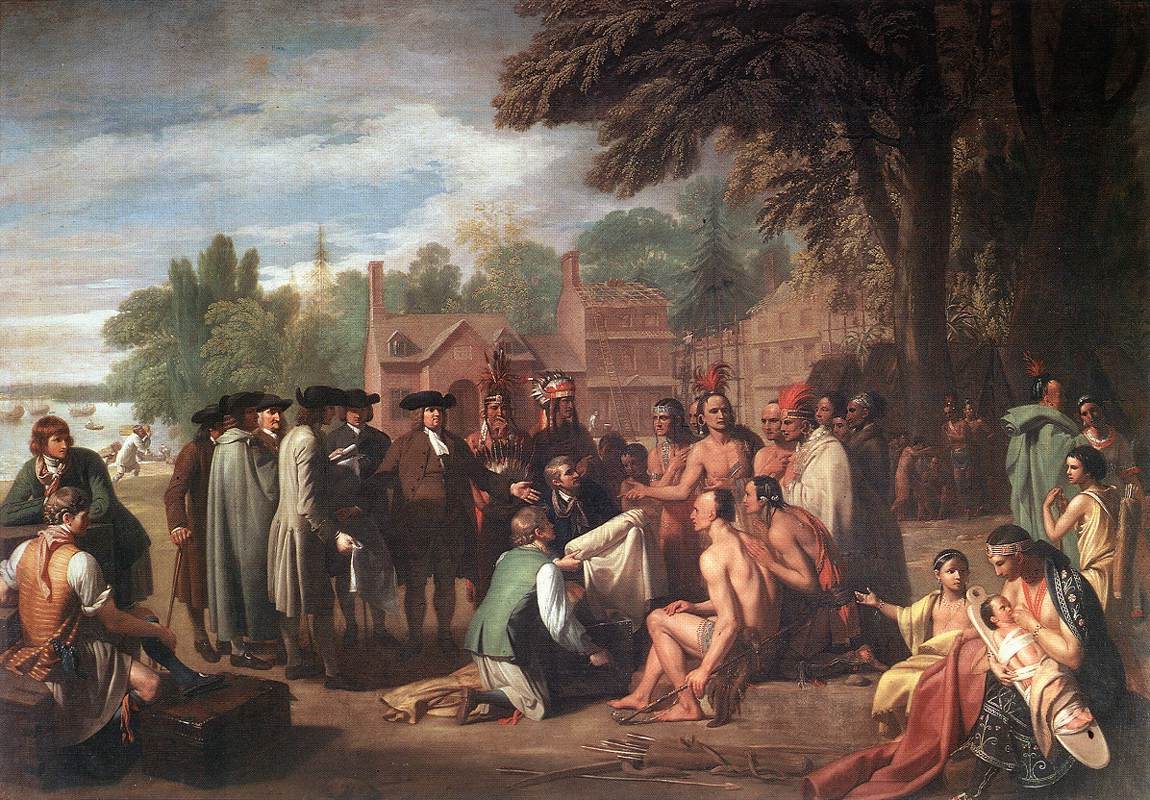
Benjamin West, The Treaty of Penn with the Indians, 1771–72, Pennsylvania Academy of the Fine Arts in Philadelphia

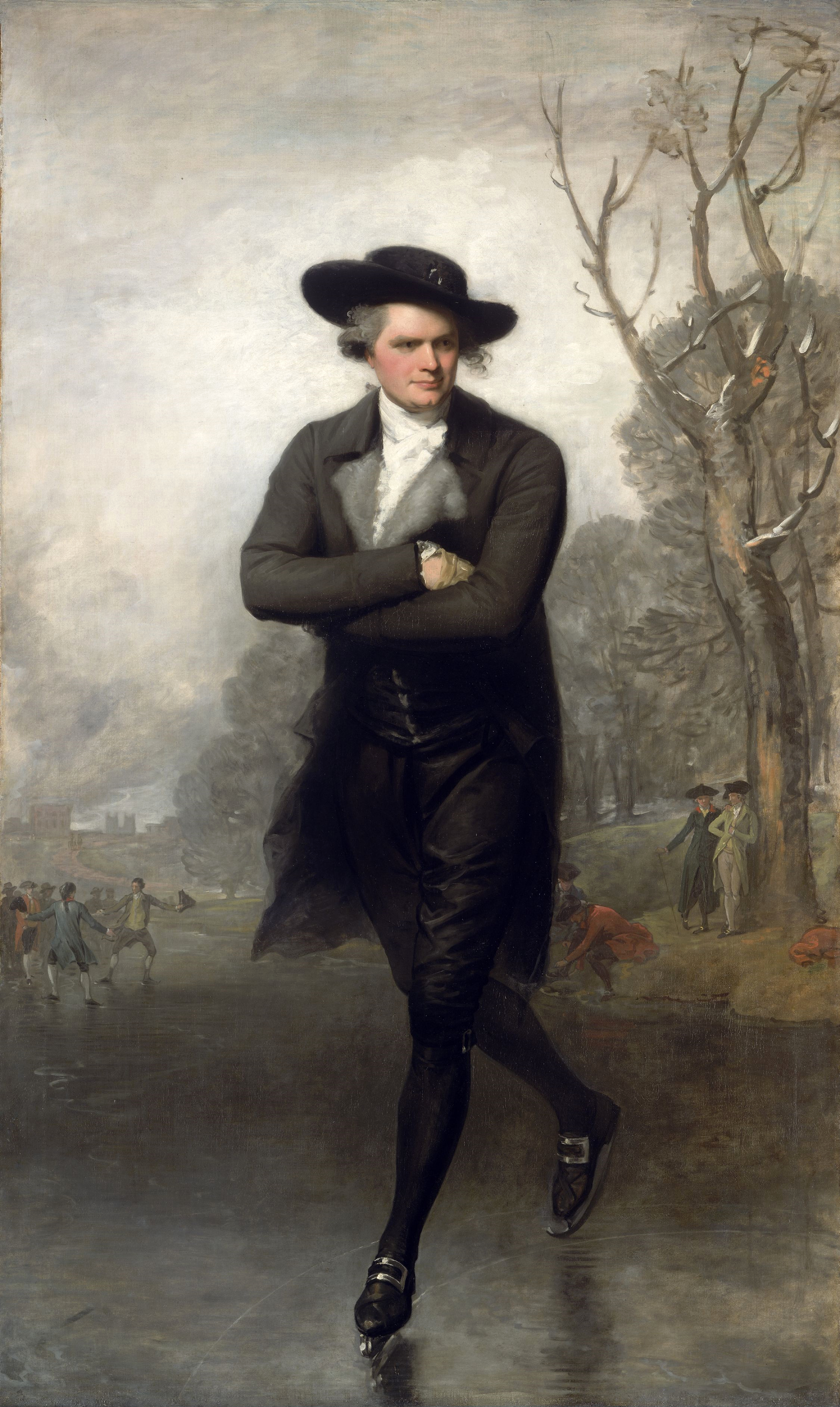
Gilbert Stuart, The Skater, 1782, National Gallery of Art, Washington, D.C.

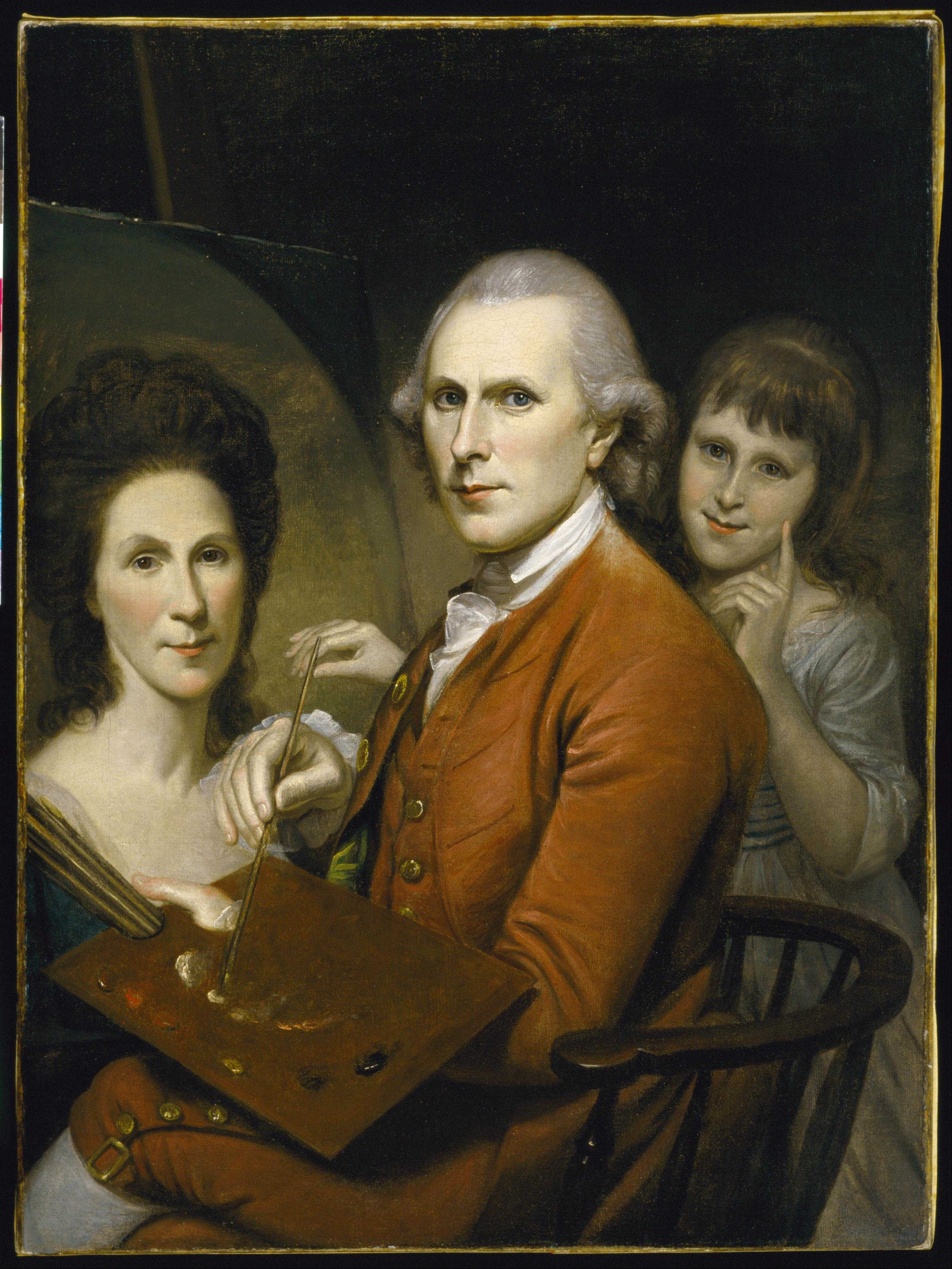
Charles Willson Peale, Self-portrait, c. 1782–1785, Museum of Fine Arts Houston

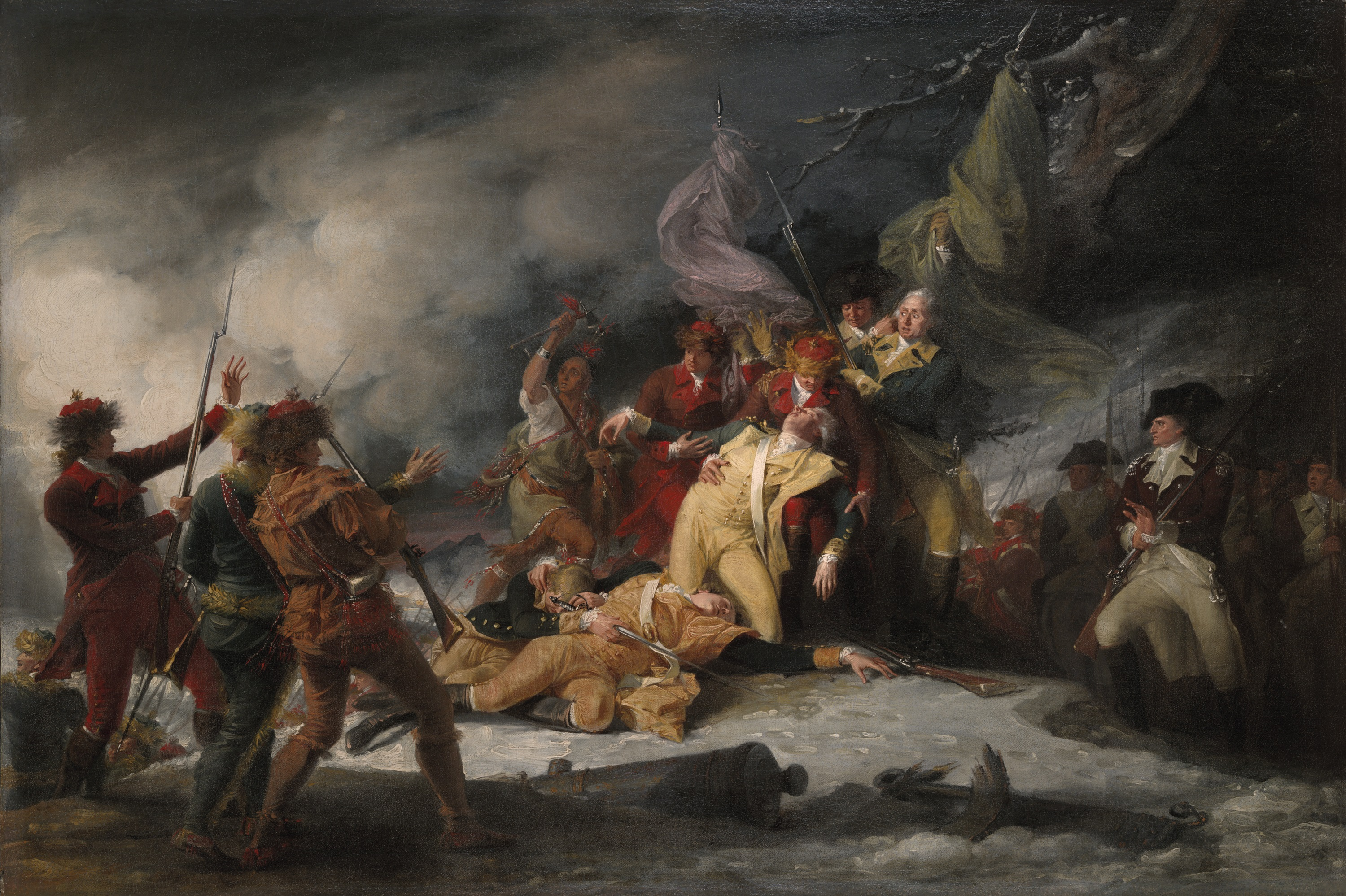
John Trumbull, The Death of General Montgomery in the Attack on Quebec, December 31, 1775, 1786, Yale University Art Gallery

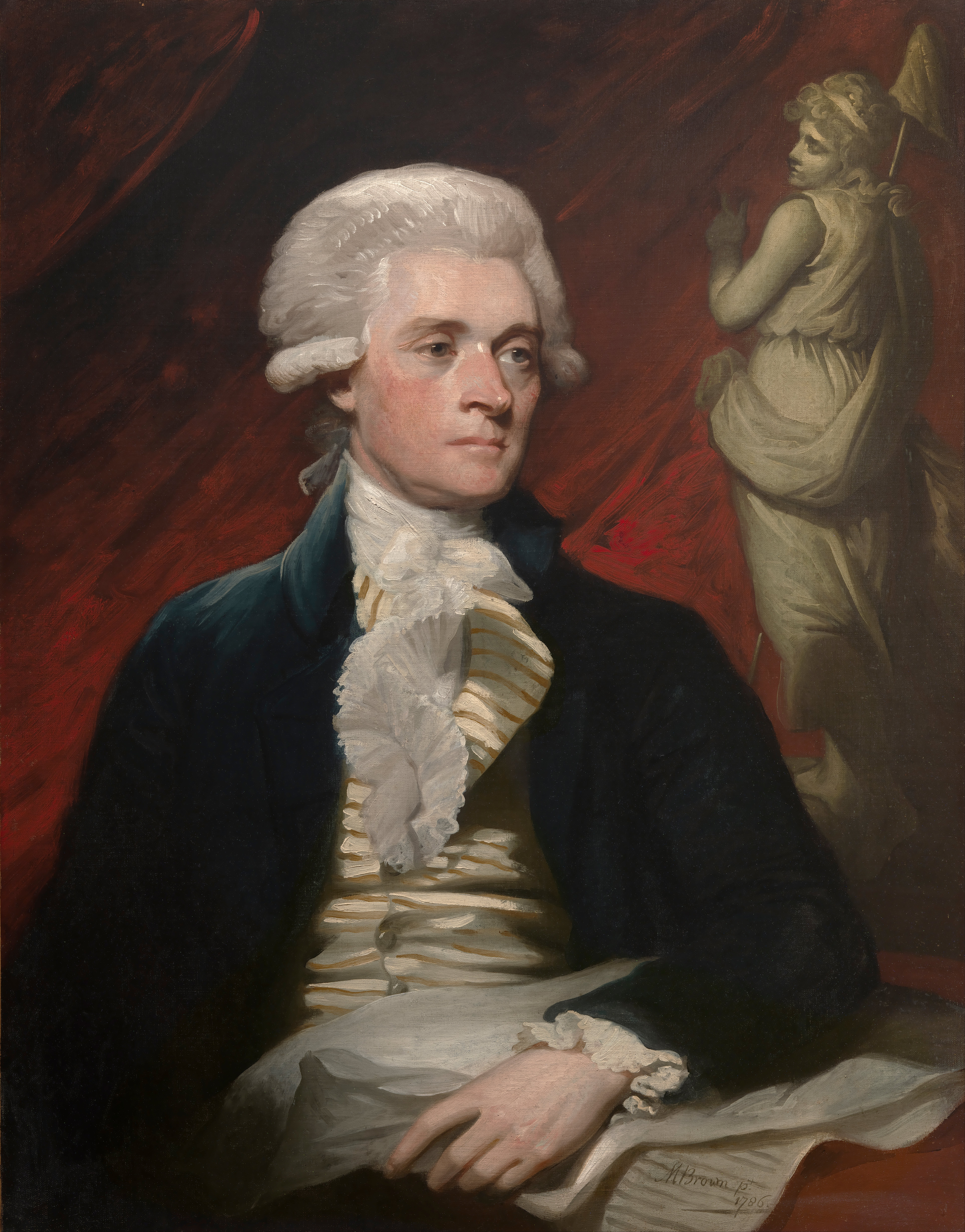
Mather Brown, Portrait of Thomas Jefferson, 1786, National Portrait Gallery, Washington, D.C.

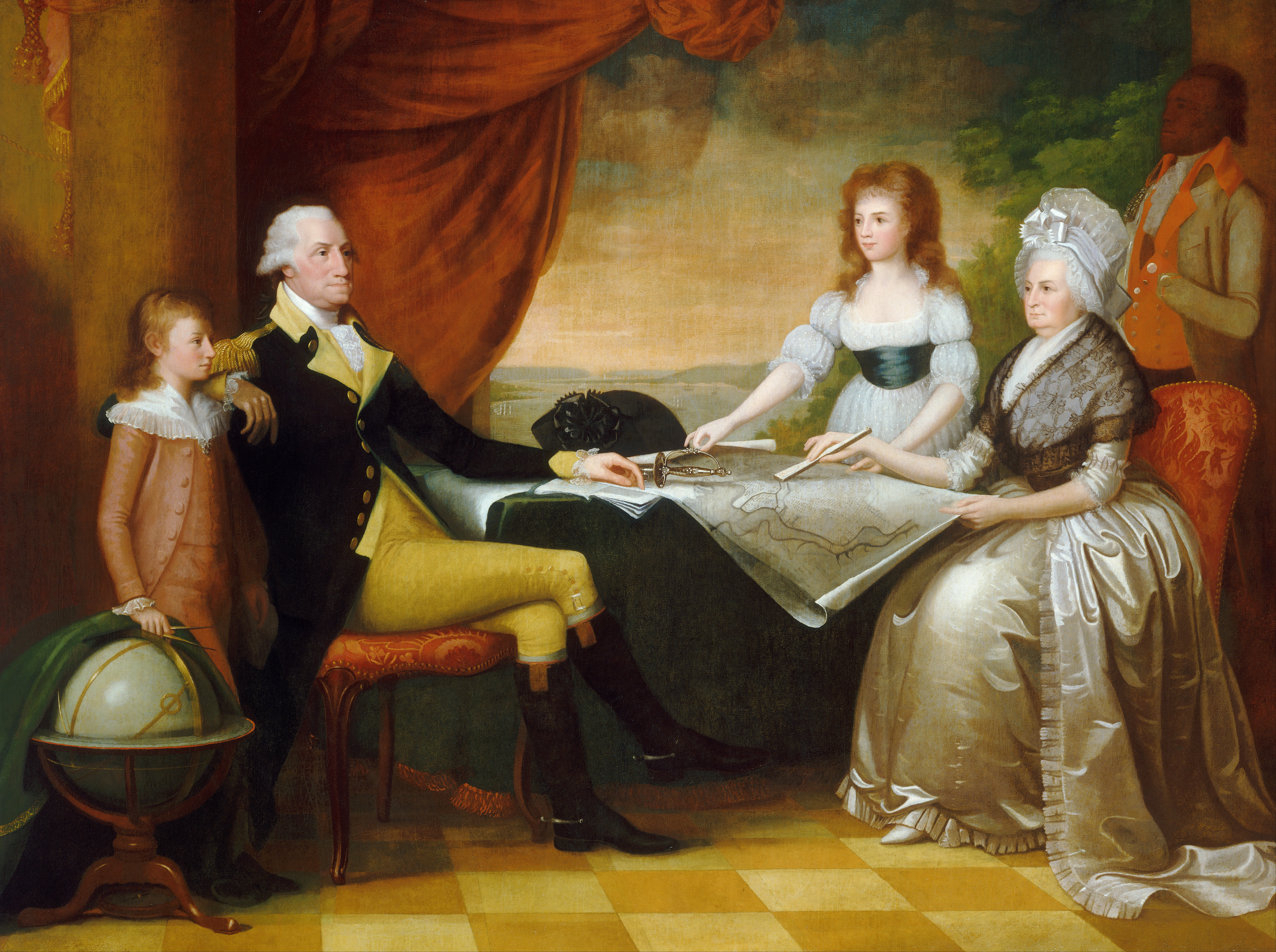
Edward Savage, The Washington Family 1789–1796, National Gallery of Art, Washington, D.C.

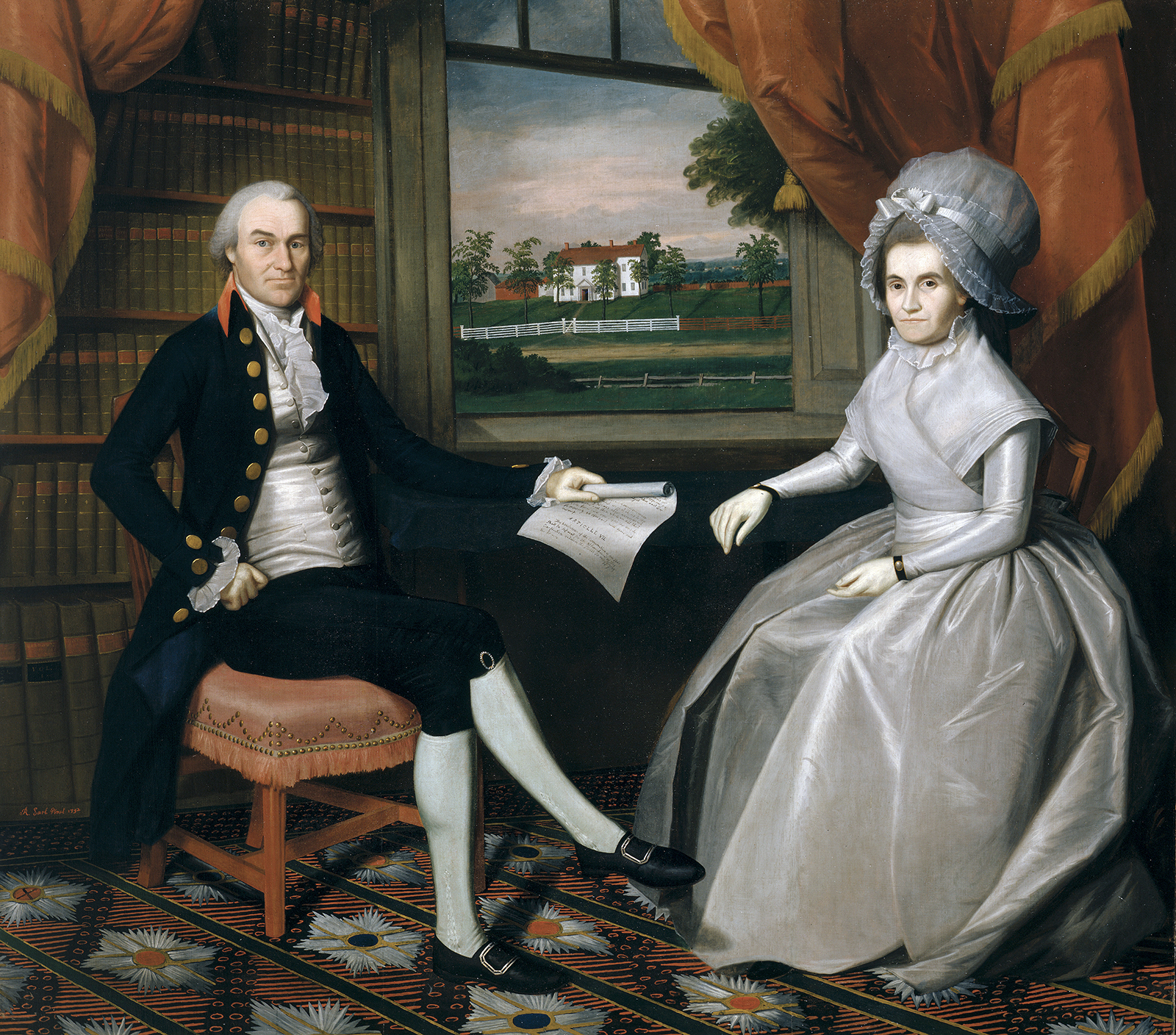
Ralph Earl, Portrait of Oliver Ellsworth and Abigail Wolcott Ellsworth, 1792, Wadsworth Atheneum

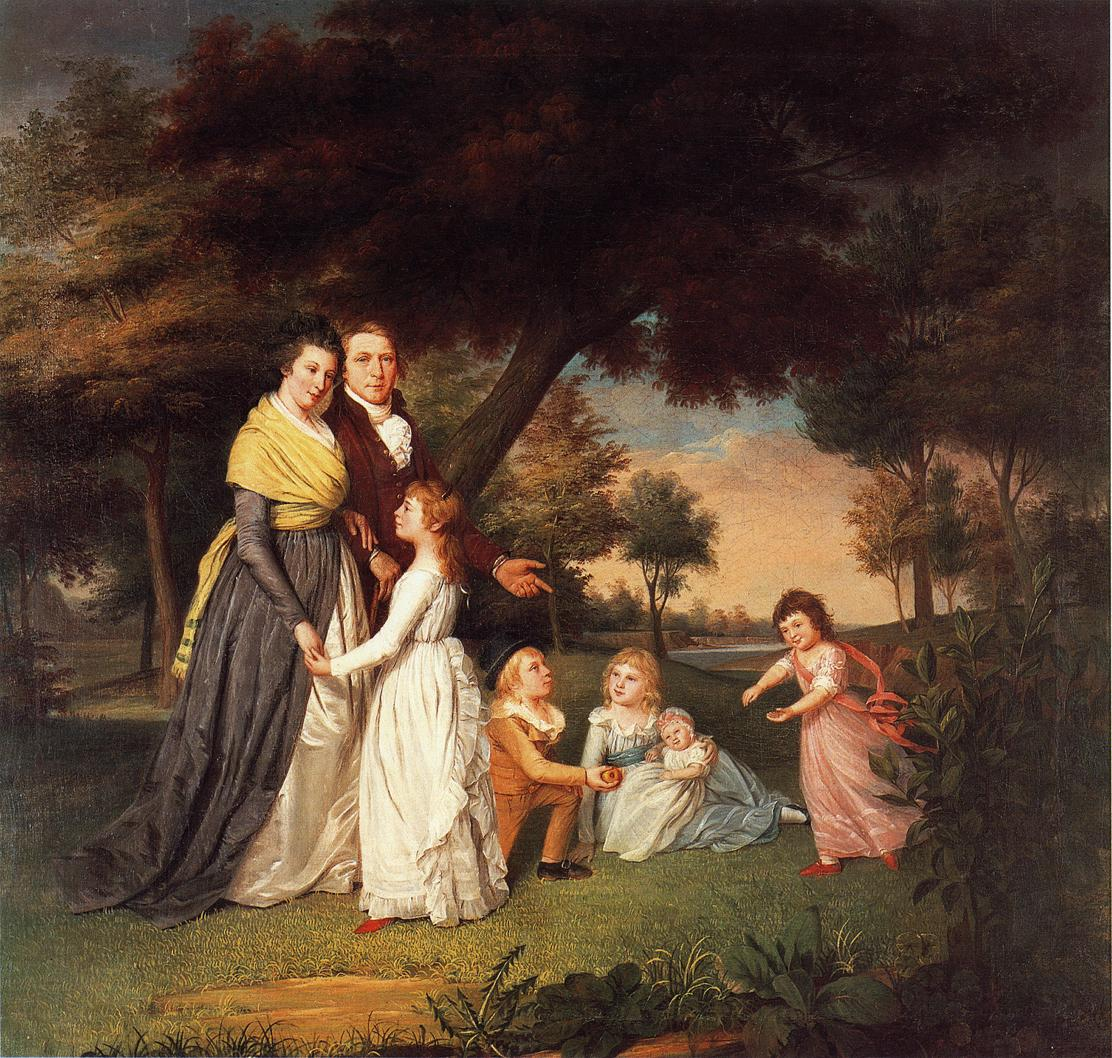
James Peale, The Artist and His Family, 1795. Pennsylvania Academy of the Fine Arts

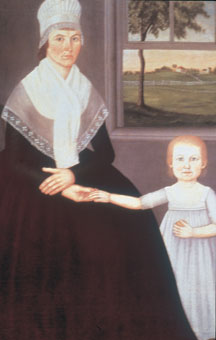
John Brewster Jr., Mother with Son (Lucy Knapp Mygatt and Son, George, of Danbury, Connecticut), 1799

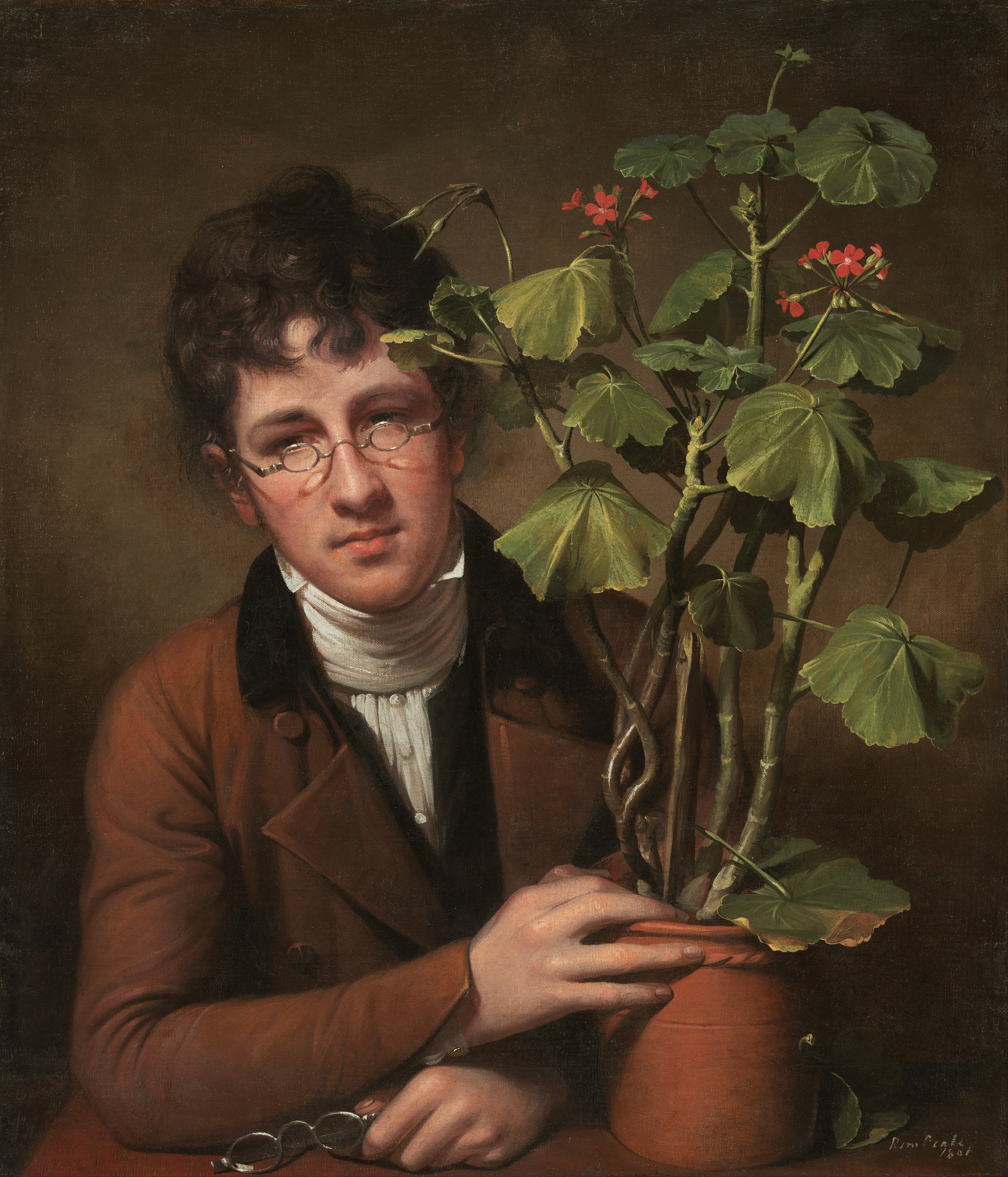
Rembrandt Peale, Rubens Peale With a Geranium, 1801, National Gallery of Art, Washington, D.C.

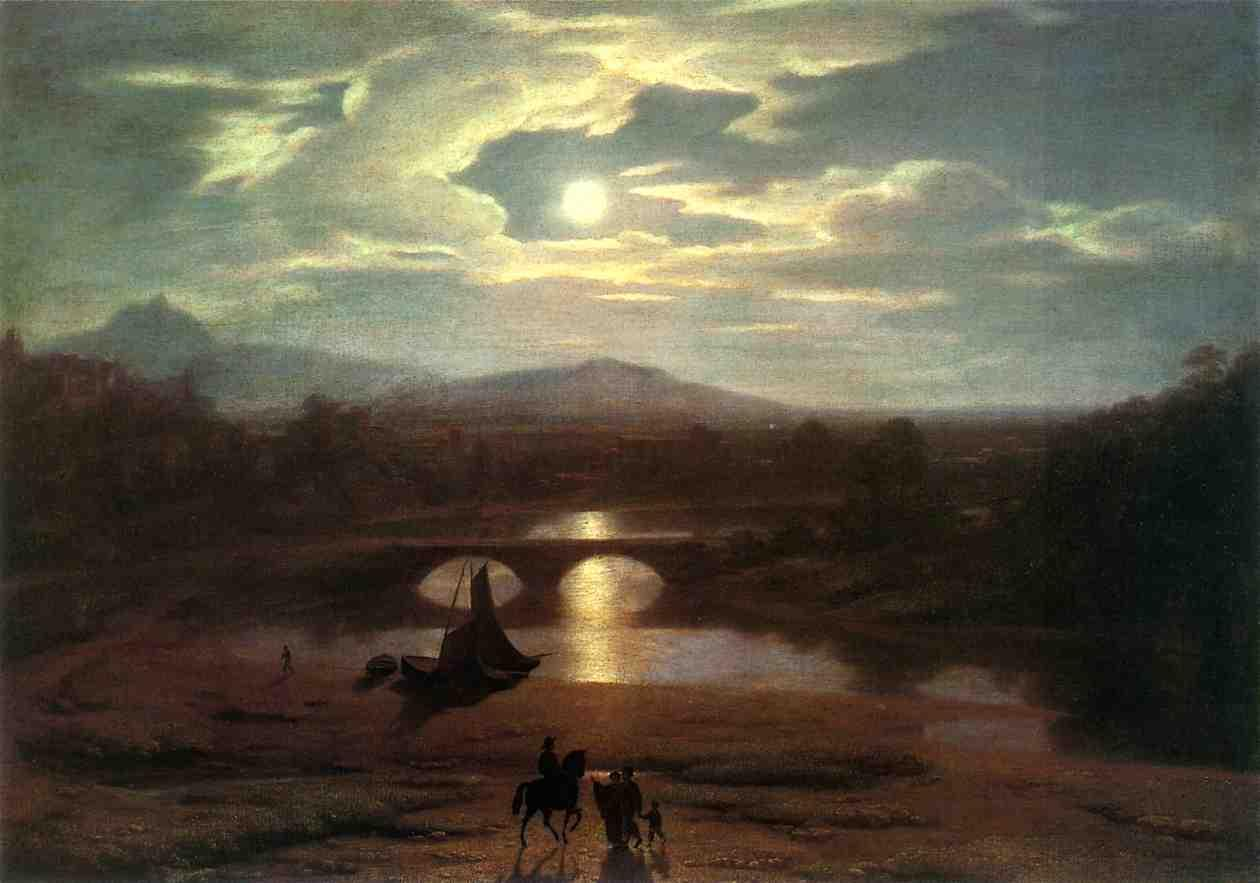
Washington Allston, Moonlit Landscape, 1809, Museum of Fine Arts, Boston, Massachusetts

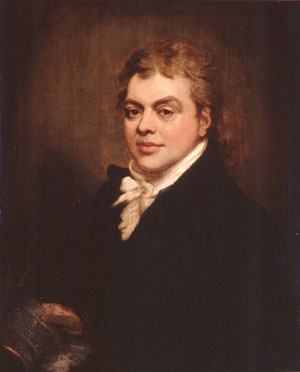
Mather Brown, Self-portrait, c. 1812, American Antiquarian Society, Worcester, Massachusetts

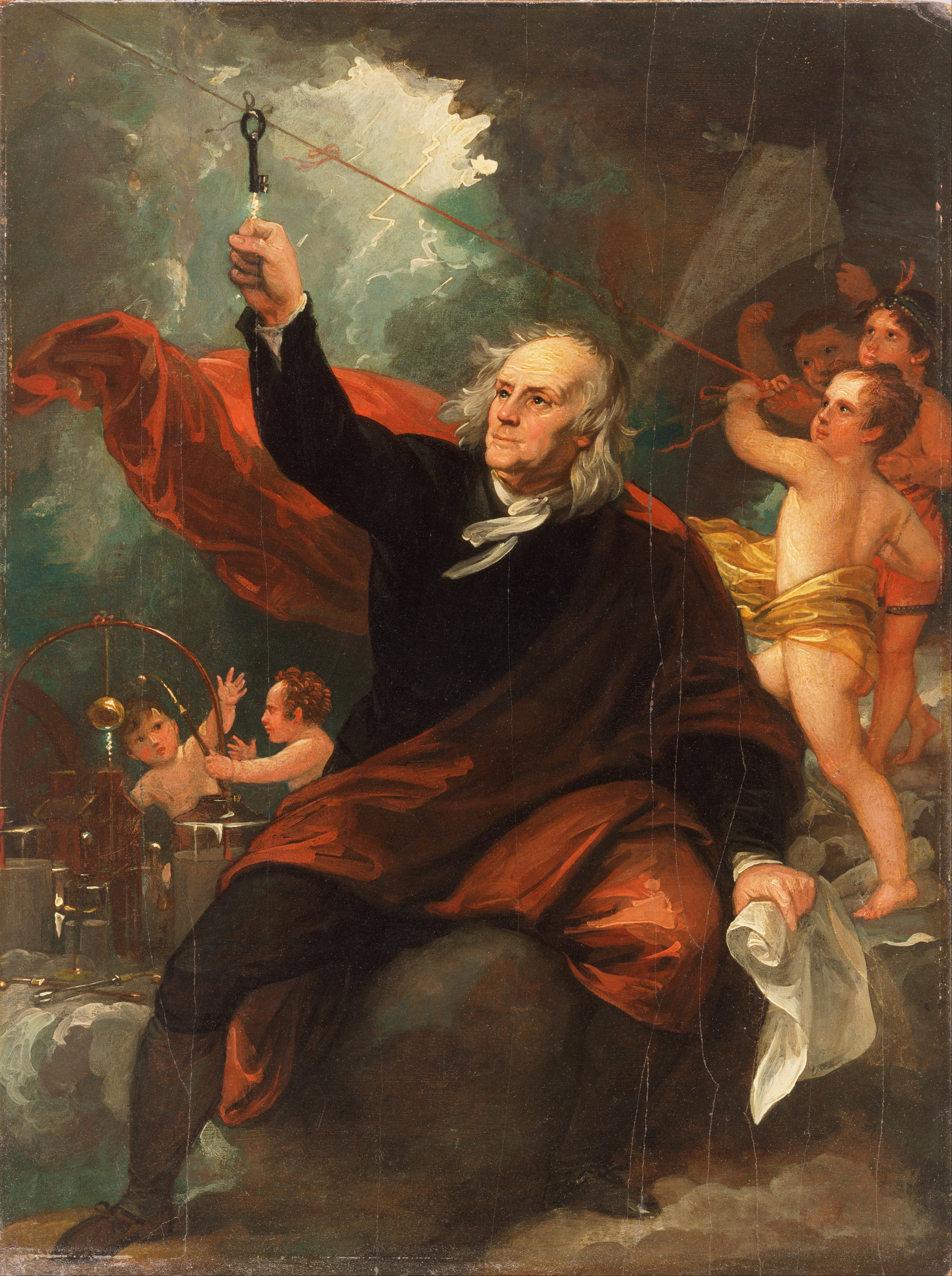
Benjamin West, Benjamin Franklin Drawing Electricity from the Sky, c. 1816, Philadelphia Museum of Art

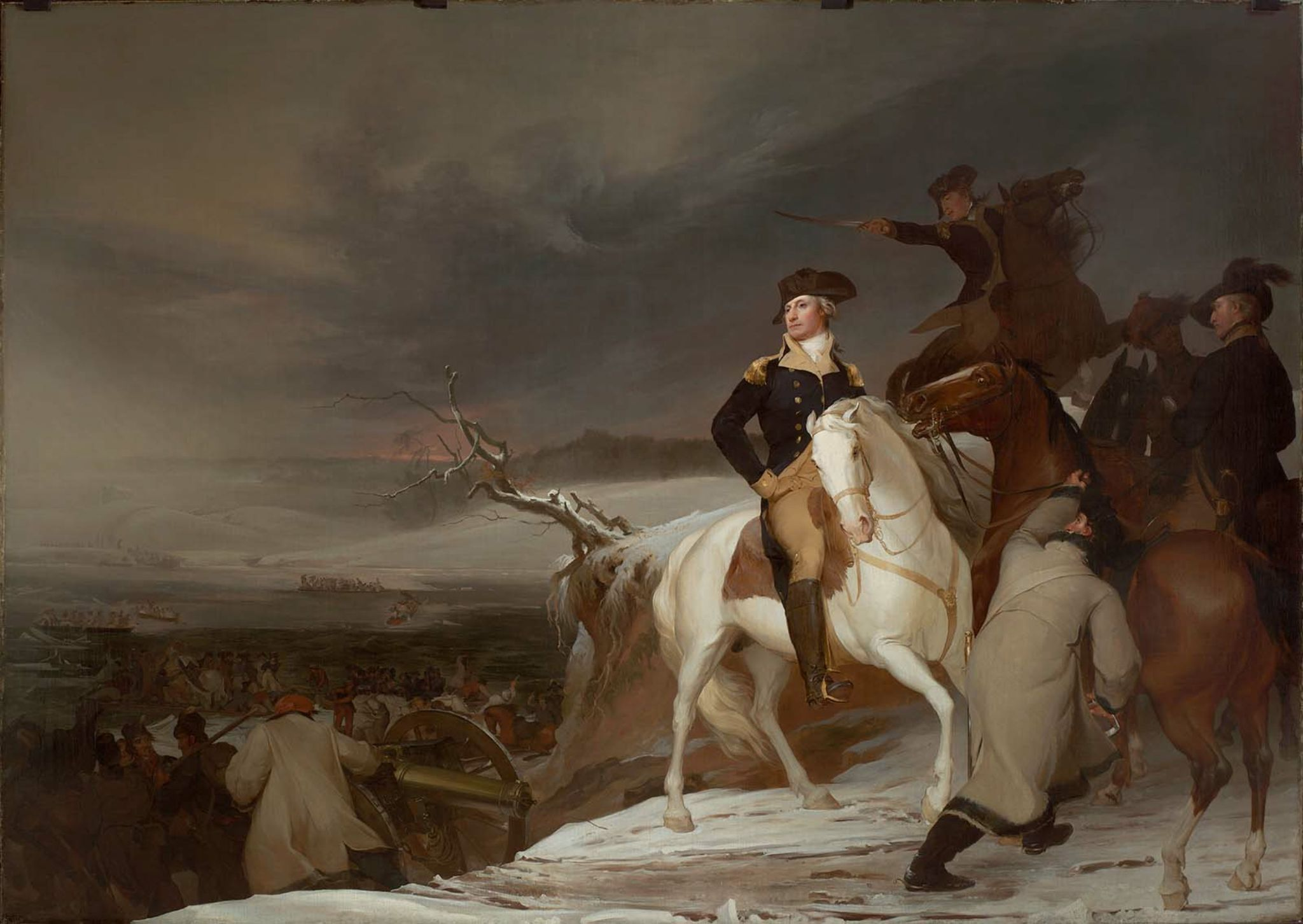
Thomas Sully, The Passage of the Delaware, 1819, Museum of Fine Arts, Boston

== 19th century ==
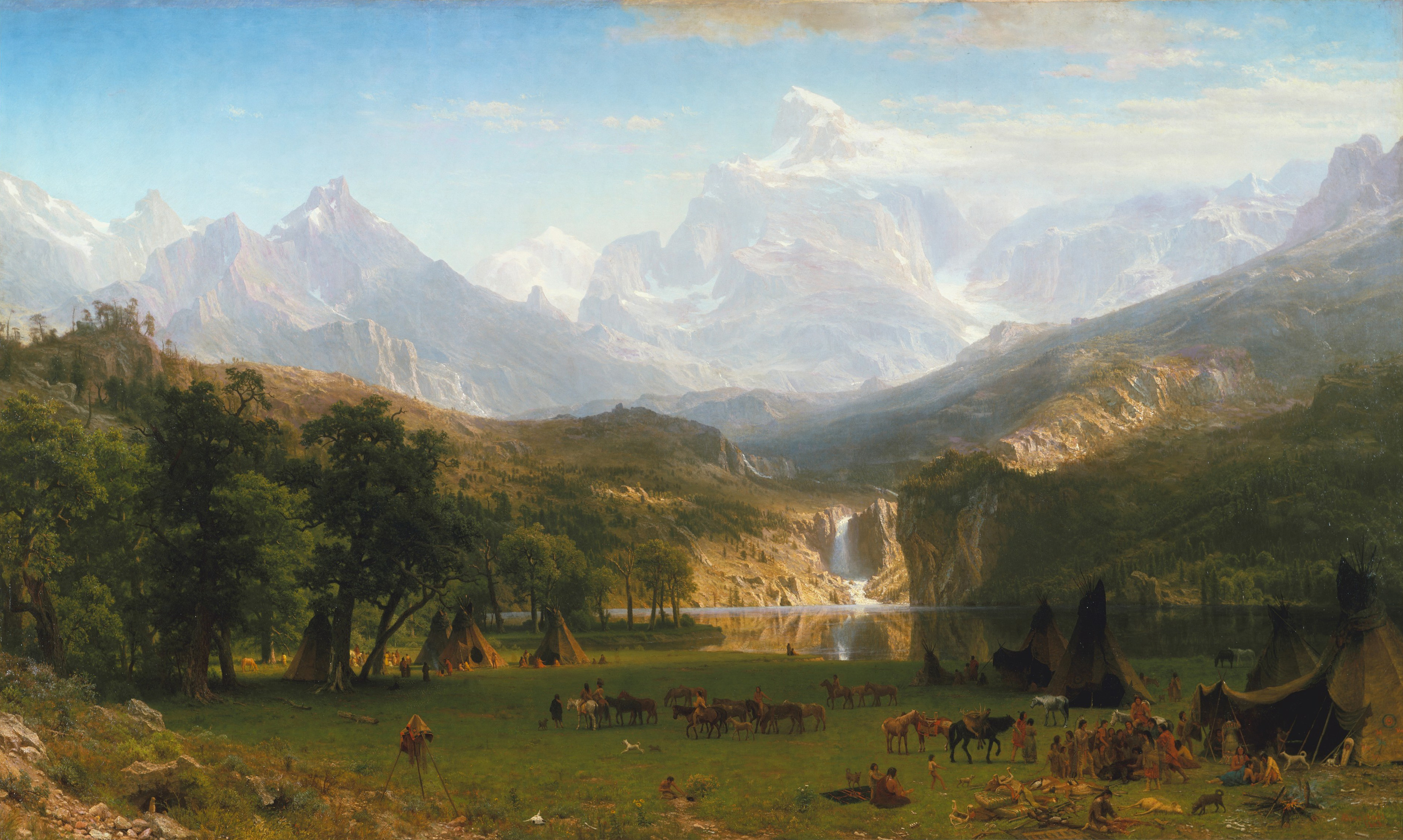
Albert Bierstadt, The Rocky Mountains, Lander's Peak, 1863, Metropolitan Museum of Art: an example of the Hudson River School

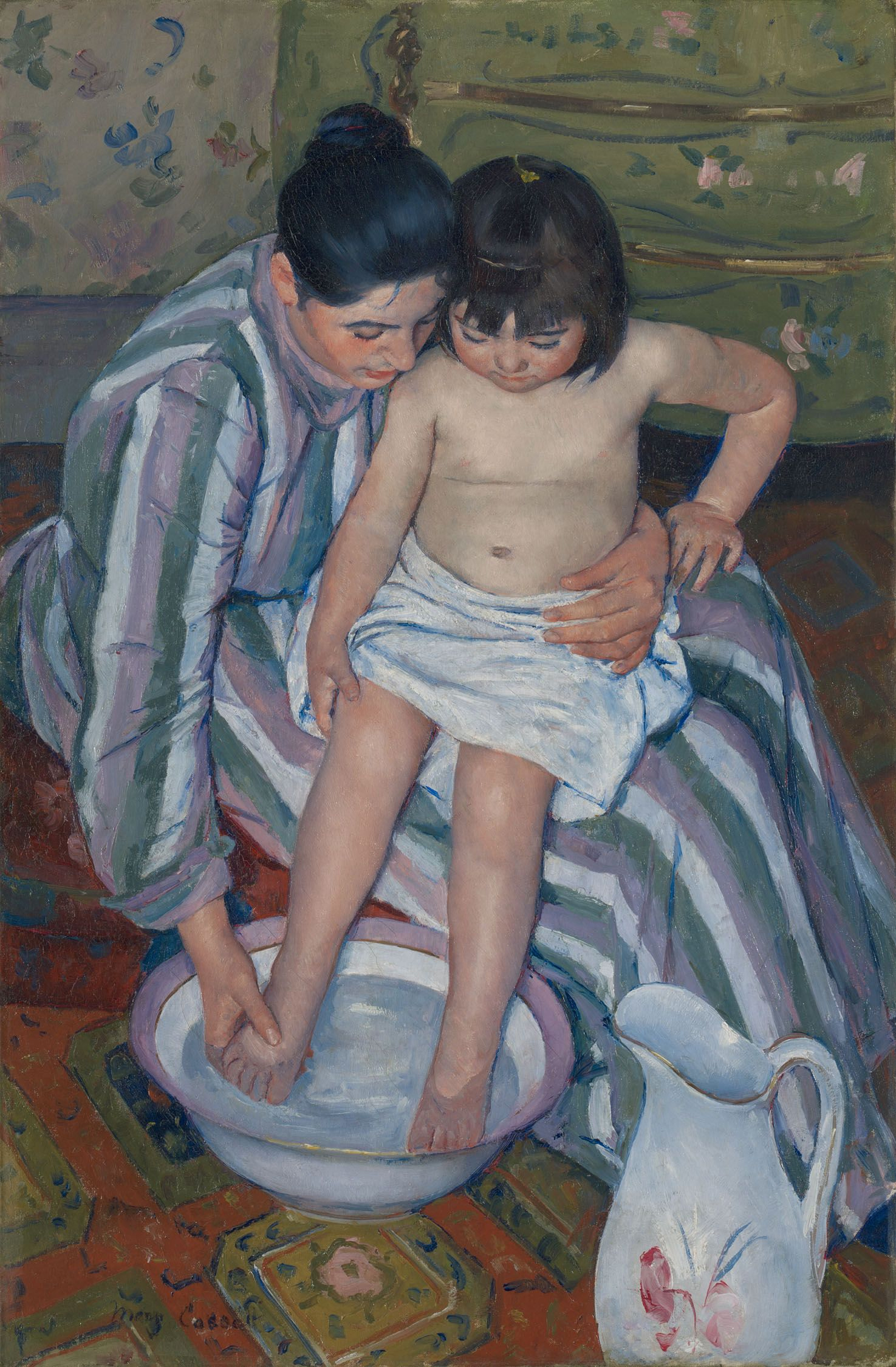
Mary Cassatt, The Child's Bath 1891–1892, Art Institute of Chicago

National Gallery of Art, Washington DC.

James McNeill Whistler, Arrangement in Grey and Black: The Artist's Mother, 1871, popularly known as Whistler's Mother, Musée d'Orsay, Paris

The first well-known U.S. school of painting—the Hudson River School—appeared in 1820. Thomas Cole pioneered the movement which included Albert Bierstadt, Frederic Edwin Church, Thomas Doughty and several others. As with music and literature, this development was delayed until artists perceived that the New World offered subjects unique to itself; in this case the westward expansion of settlement brought the transcendent beauty of frontier landscapes to painters' attention.

The Hudson River painters' directness and simplicity of vision influenced and inspired such later artists as John Kensett and the Luminists; as well as George Inness and the tonalists (which included Albert Pinkham Ryder and Ralph Blakelock among others), and Winslow Homer who depicted the rural U.S.—the sea, the mountains, and the people who lived near them.

The Hudson River School landscape painter Robert S. Duncanson was one of the first important African American painters. John James Audubon, an ornithologist whose paintings documented birds, was one of the most important naturalist artists in the early U.S. His major work, a set of colored prints entitled The Birds of America (1827–1839), is considered one of the finest ornithological works ever completed. Edward Hicks was a U.S. folk painter and distinguished minister of the Society of Friends. He became a Quaker icon because of his paintings.

Paintings of the West, many of which emphasized the sheer size of the land and the cultures of the native people living on it, became a distinct genre as well. George Catlin depicted the West and its people as honestly as possible. George Caleb Bingham, and later Frederic Remington, Charles M. Russell, the photographer Edward S. Curtis, and others recorded the U.S. western heritage and the Old American West through their art.

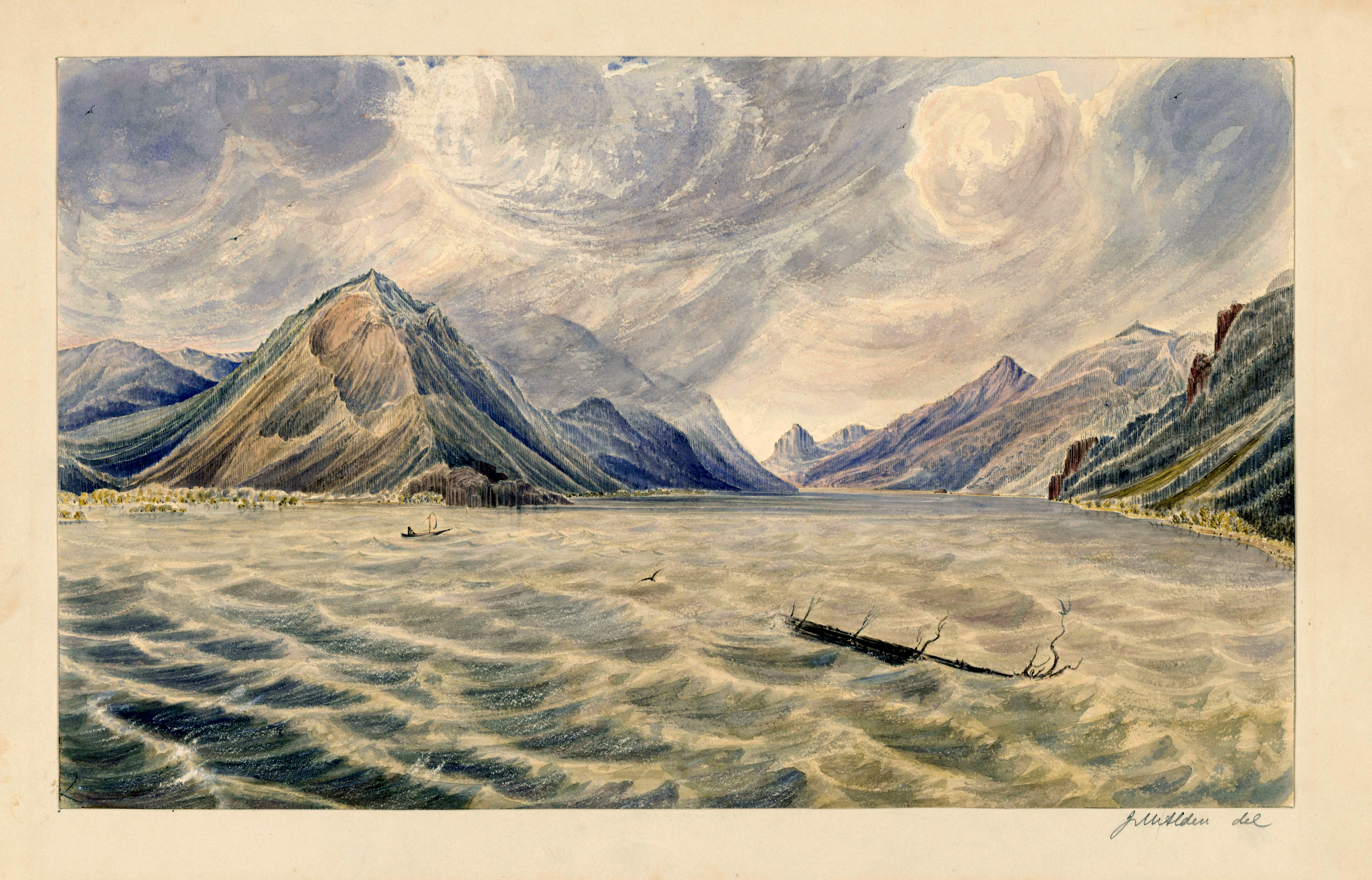
Wind Mountain, watercolor painting (between 1857 and 1862) by James Madison Alden

History painting was a less popular genre in U.S. art during the 19th century, although Washington Crossing the Delaware, painted by the German-born Emanuel Leutze, is among the best-known U.S. paintings. The historical and military paintings of William B. T. Trego were widely published after his death (according to Edwin A. Peeples, "There is probably not an American History book which doesn't have (a) Trego picture in it").

Portrait painters in the U.S. in the 19th century included untrained limners such as Ammi Phillips, and painters schooled in the European tradition such as Thomas Sully and G.P.A. Healy. Middle-class city life found its painter in Thomas Eakins, an uncompromising realist whose unflinching honesty undercut the genteel preference for romantic sentimentalism. As a result, he was not notably successful in his lifetime, although he has since been recognized as one of the most significant U.S. artists. One of his students was Henry Ossawa Tanner, the first African-American painter to achieve international acclaim. A trompe-l'œil style of still-life painting, originating mainly in Philadelphia, included Raphaelle Peale (one of several artists of the Peale family), William Michael Harnett, and John F. Peto.

Hiram Powers, the most successful U.S. sculptor of his era, left the U.S. to spend the rest of his life in Europe, where he adopted a conventional style for his idealized female nudes such as Eve Tempted. Several important painters who are considered American spent much of their lives in Europe, notably Mary Cassatt, James McNeill Whistler, and John Singer Sargent, all of whom were influenced by French Impressionism. Theodore Robinson visited France in 1887, befriended Claude Monet, and became one of the first U.S. painters to adopt the technique. In the last decades of the century American Impressionism, as practiced by artists such as Childe Hassam and Frank W. Benson, became a popular style.

=== Selection of notable 19th-century works ===
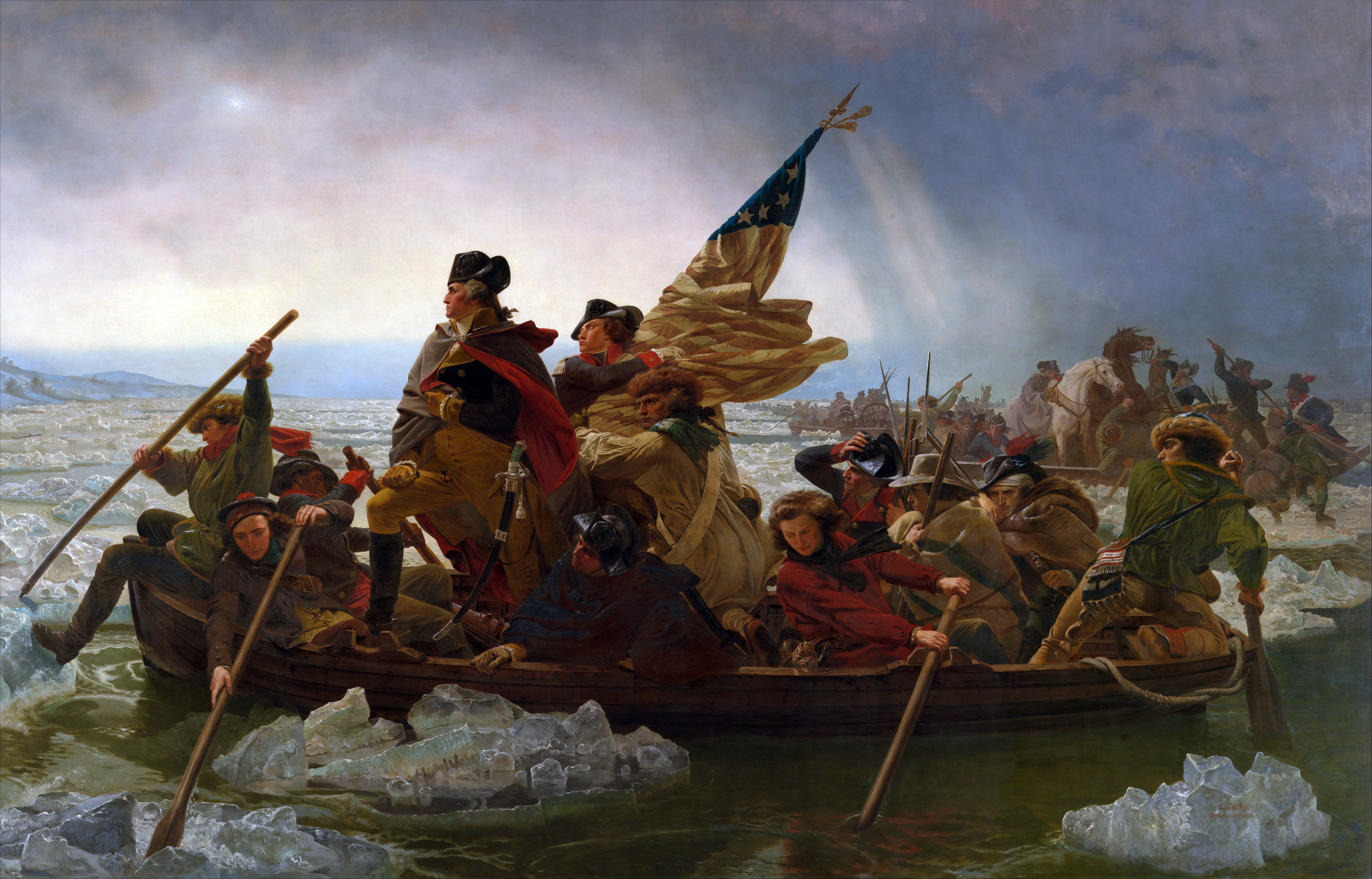
Emanuel Leutze, Washington Crossing the Delaware, 1851, Metropolitan Museum of Art

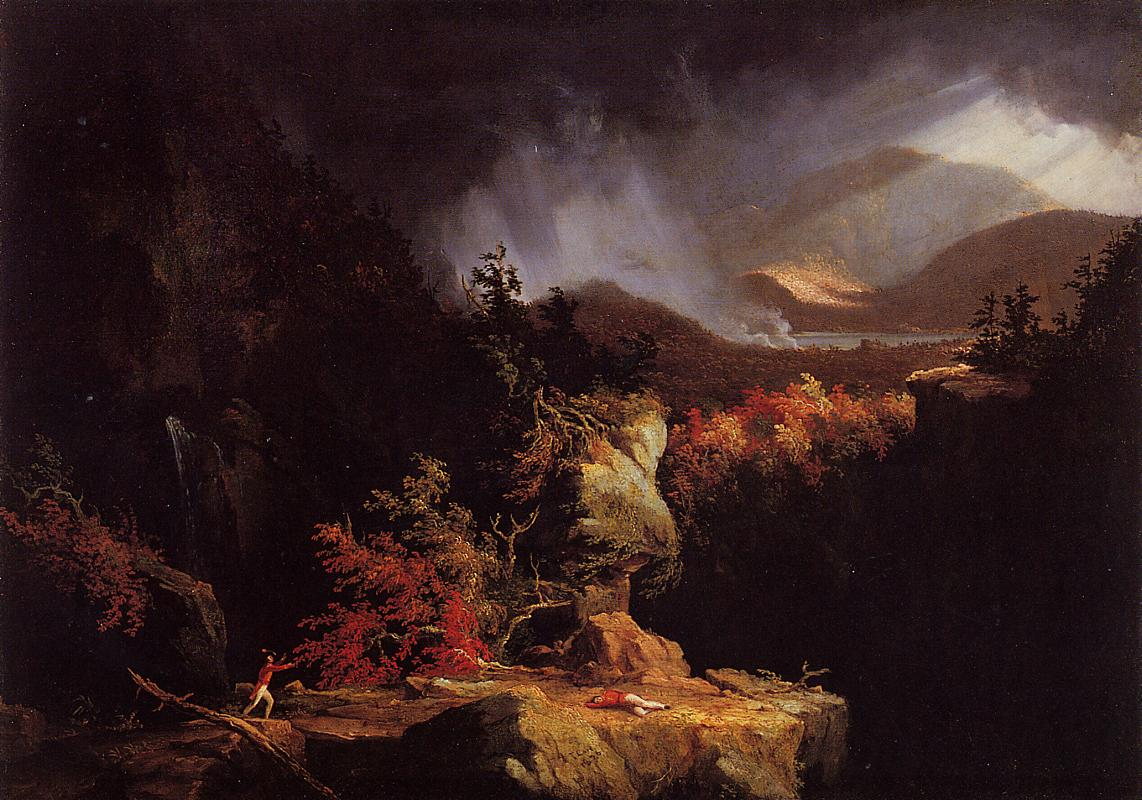
Thomas Cole, Gelyna (View near Ticonderoga), 1826–1828, Fort Ticonderoga Museum

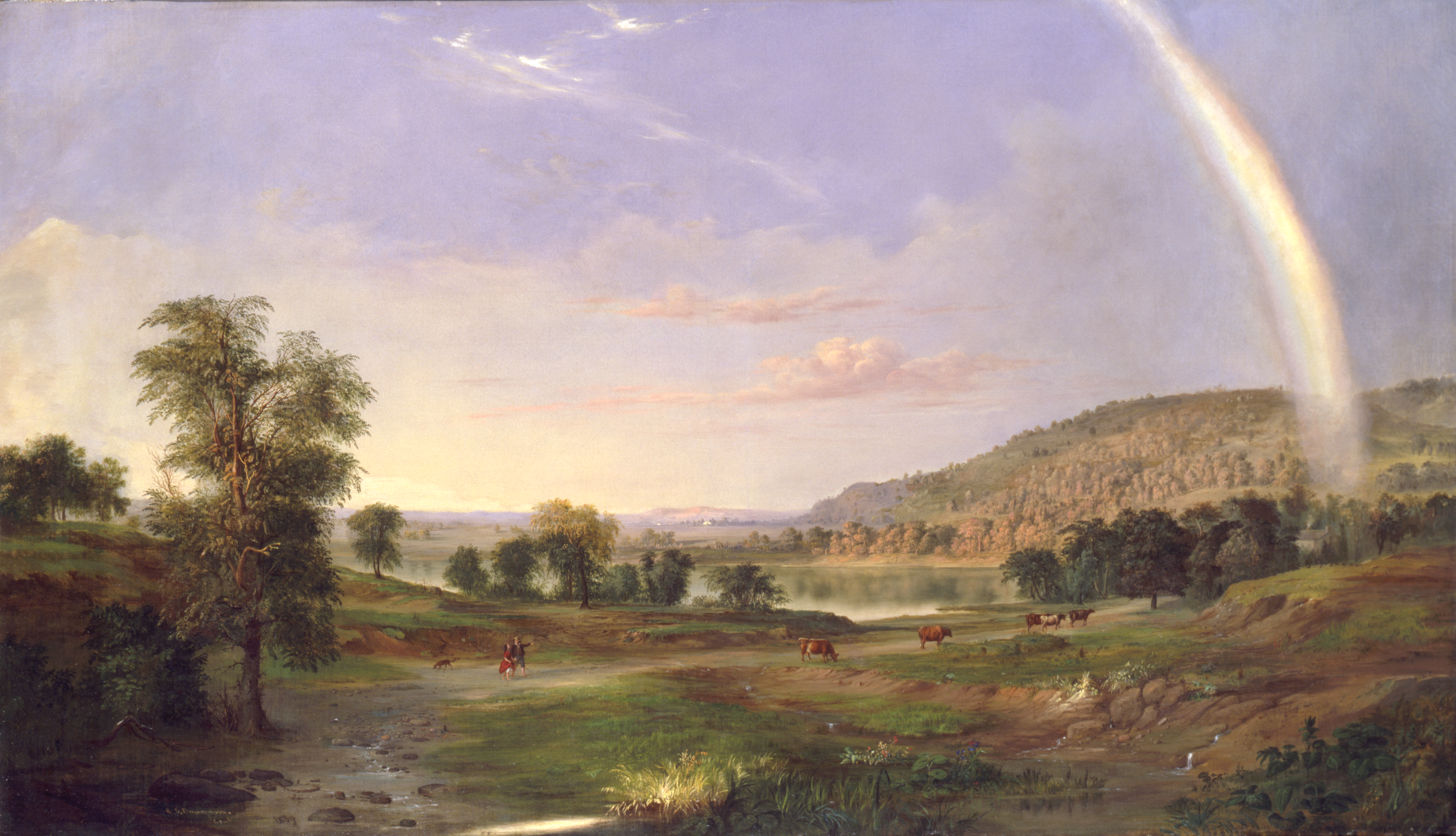
Robert S. Duncanson, Landscape with Rainbow (1859), Smithsonian American Art Museum

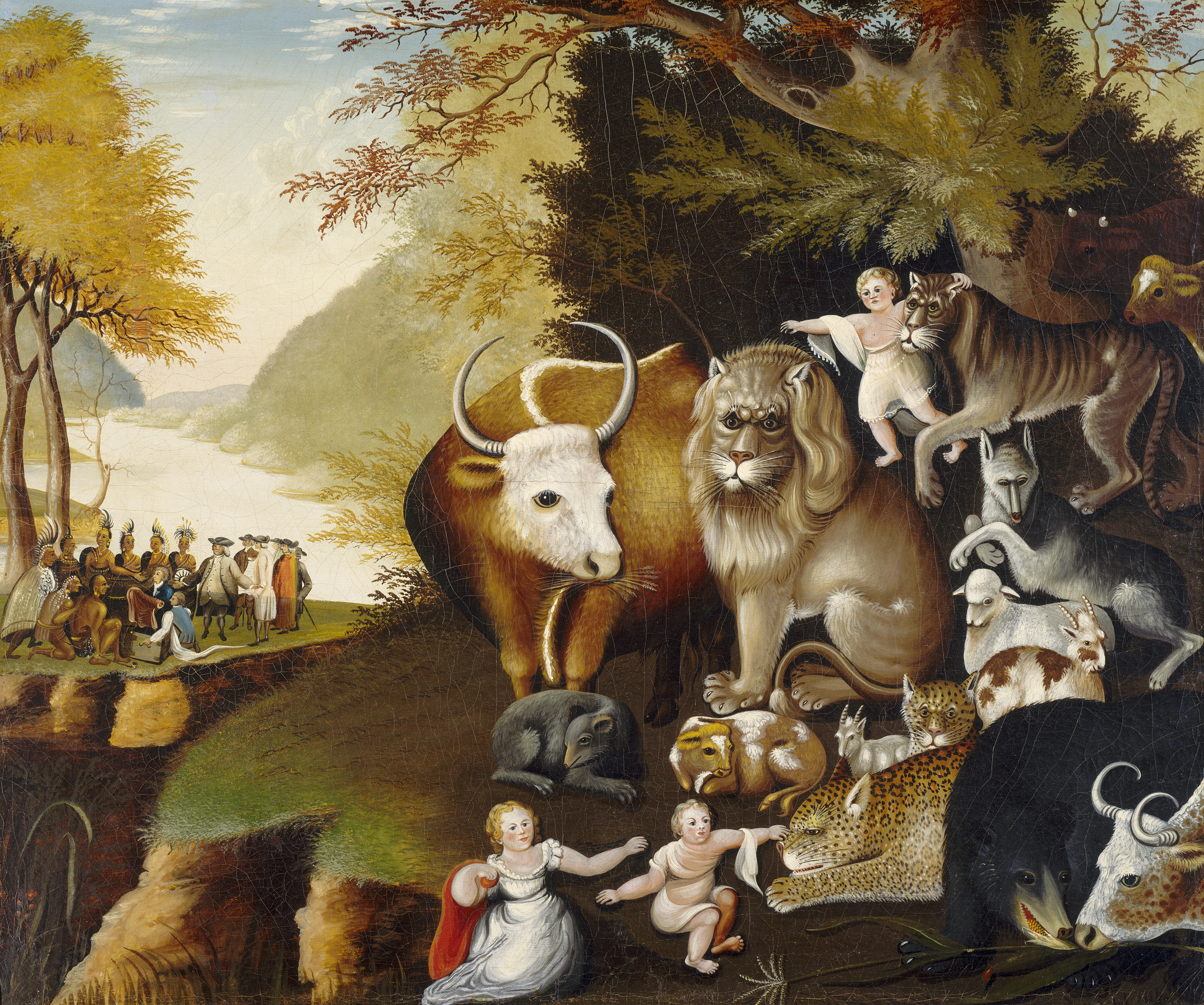
Edward Hicks, Peaceable Kingdom, c. 1834, National Gallery of Art

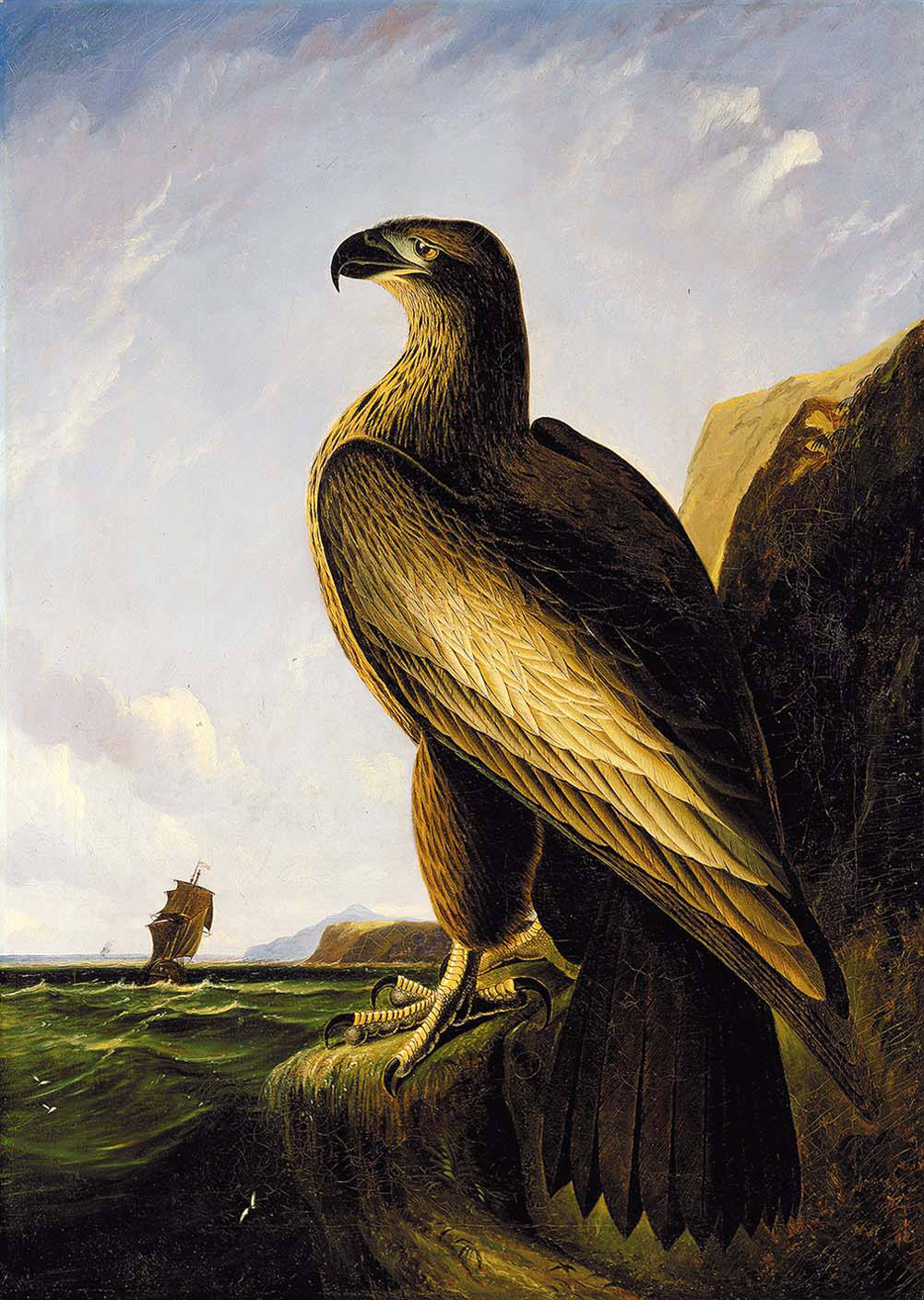
John J. Audubon, Washington Sea Eagle, c. 1836–1839, Smithsonian American Art Museum

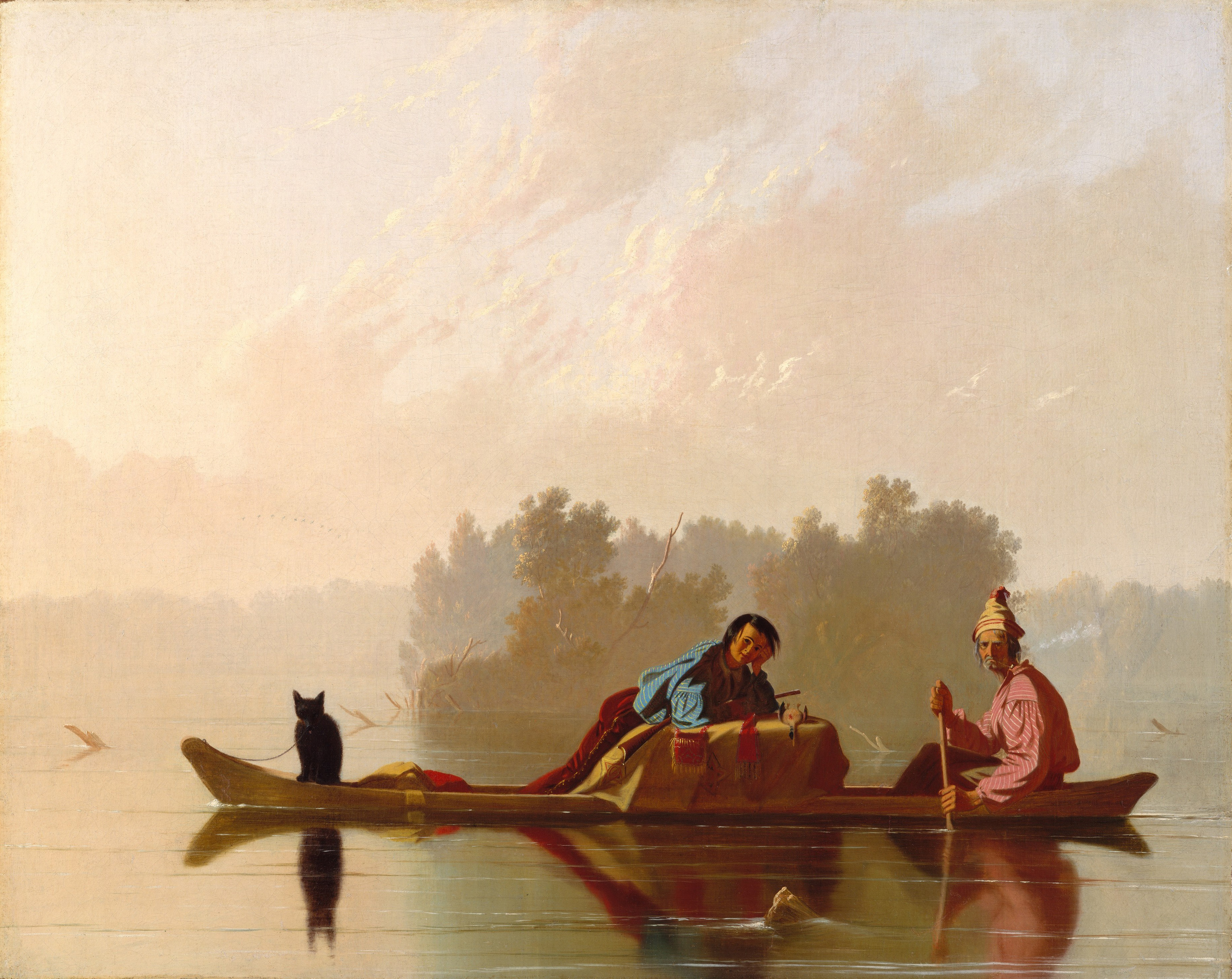
George Caleb Bingham, Fur Traders Descending the Missouri, c. 1845, Metropolitan Museum of Art

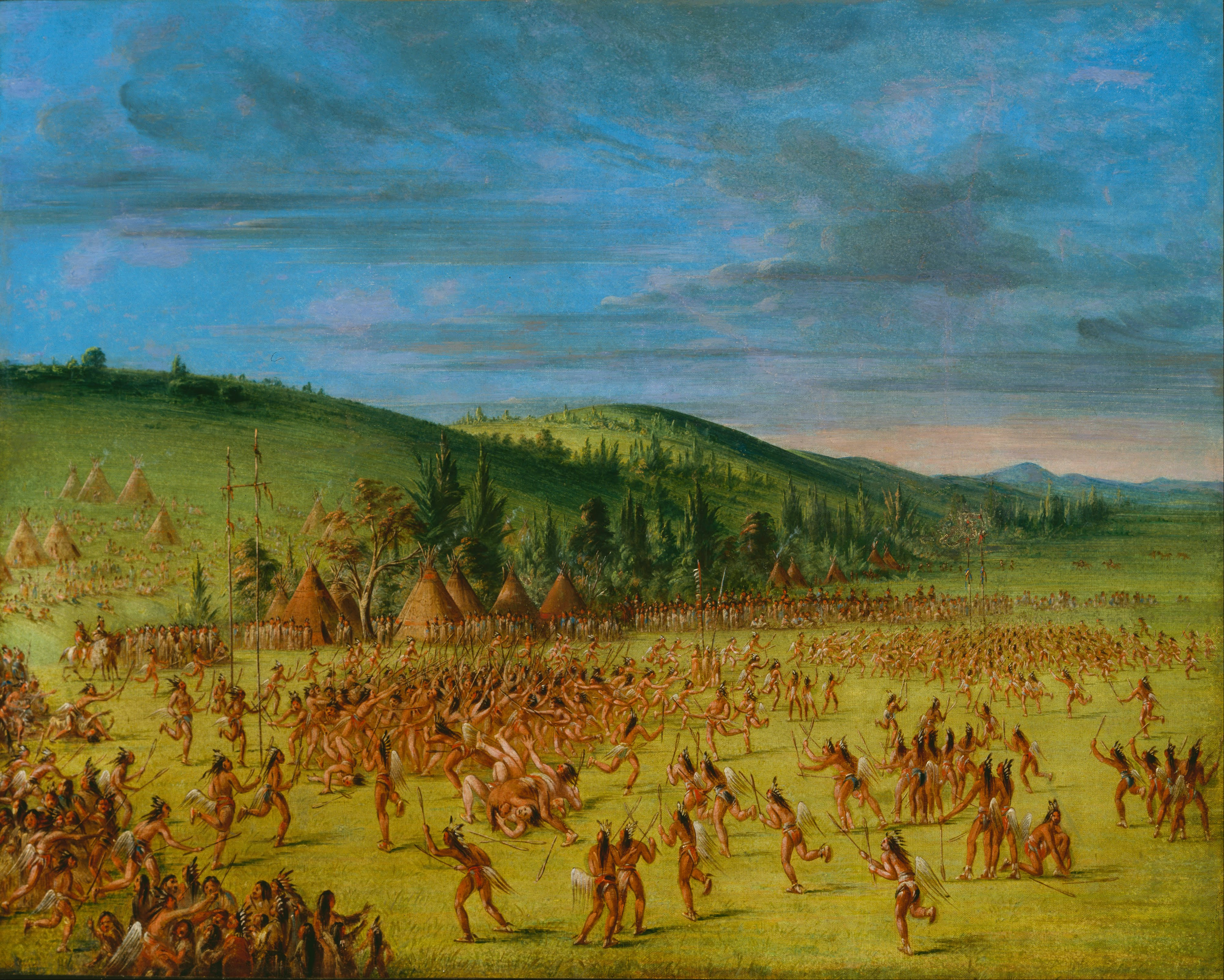
George Catlin, An Indian Ball-Play c. 1846–1850, Smithsonian American Art Museum

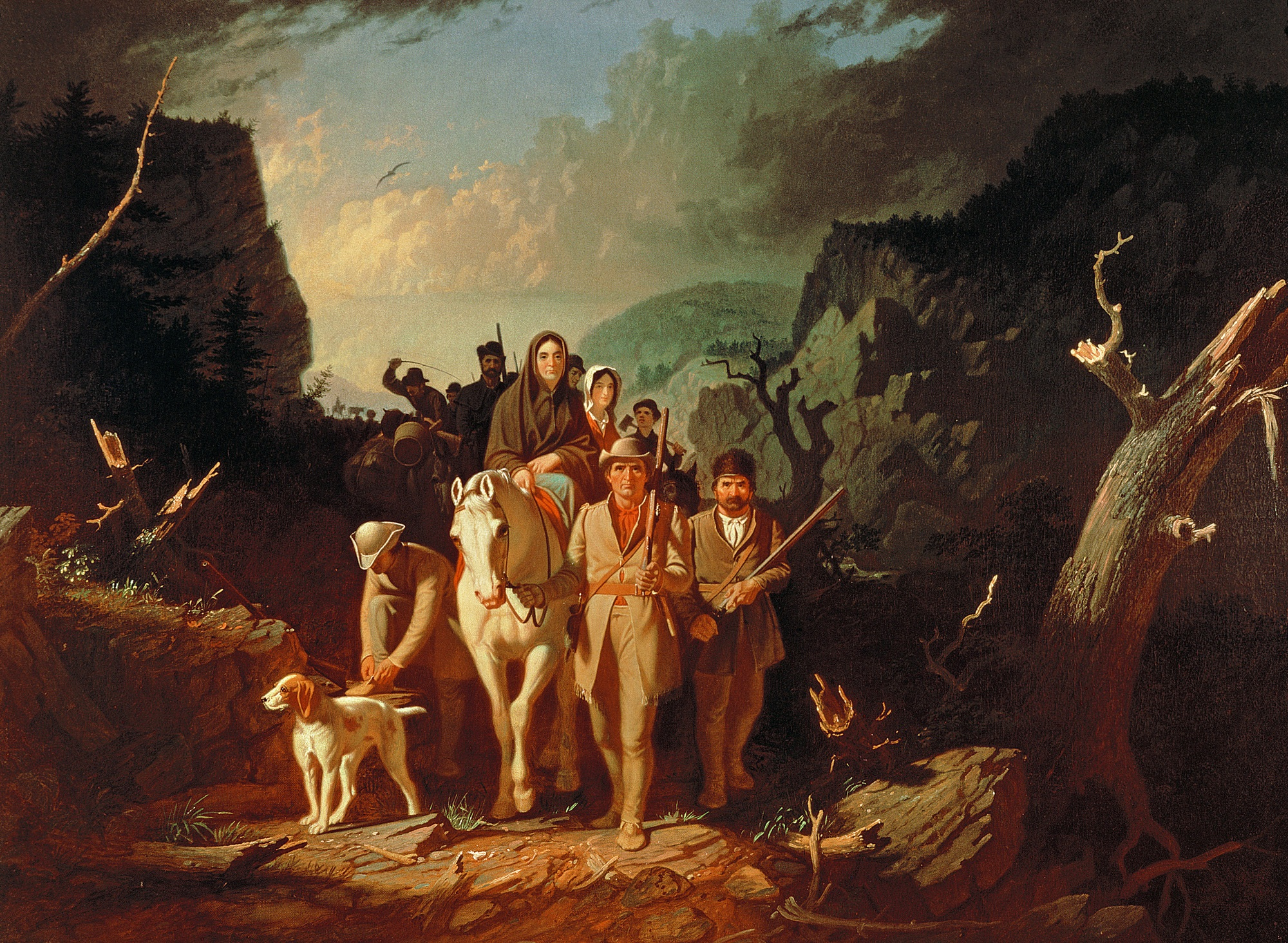
George Caleb Bingham, Daniel Boone Escorting Settlers through the Cumberland Gap, 1851–52

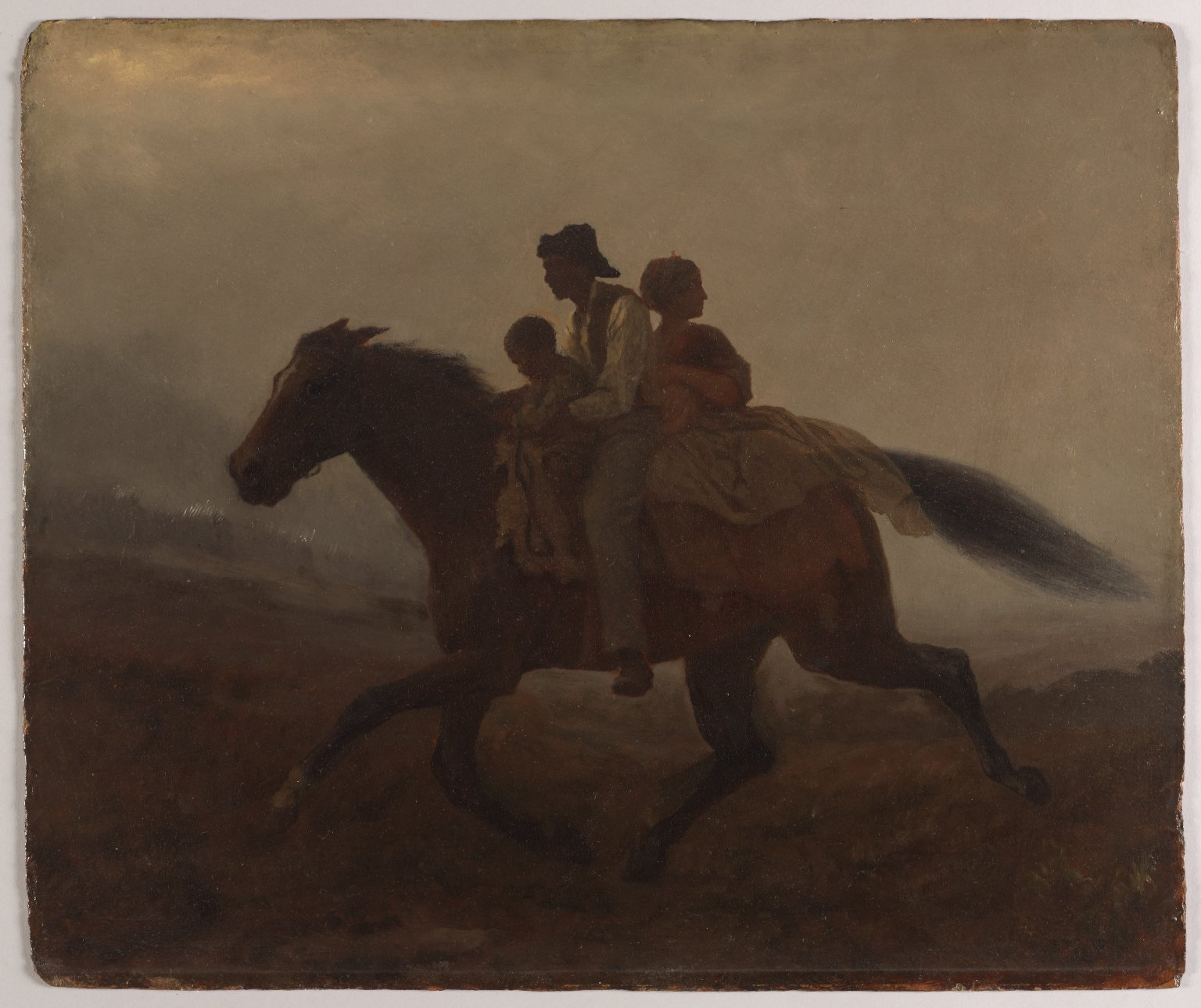
Eastman Johnson, A Ride for Liberty – The Fugitive Slaves, oil on paperboard, ca. 1862, Brooklyn Museum

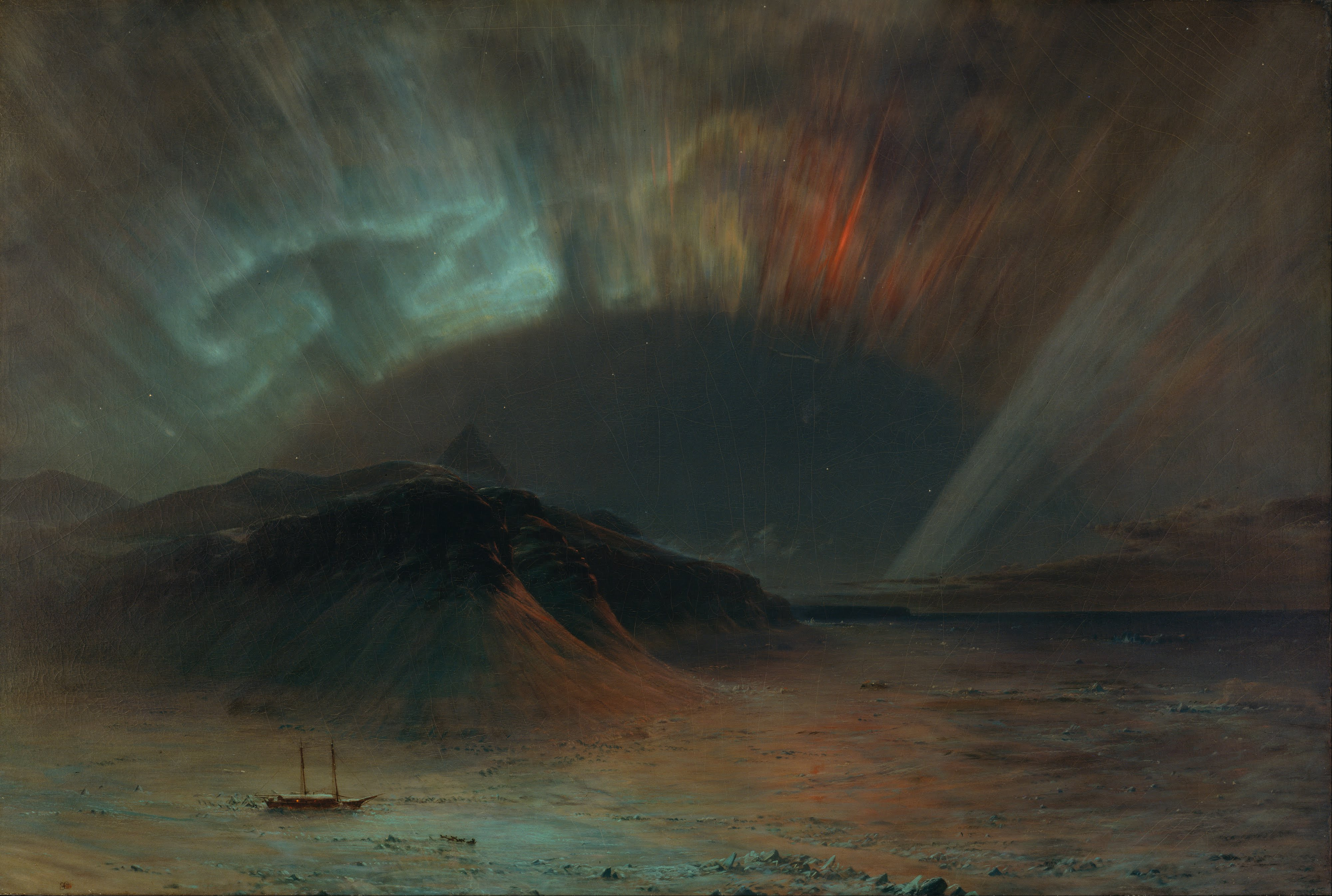
Frederic Edwin Church, Aurora Borealis, 1865, Smithsonian American Art Museum, Washington, D.C.

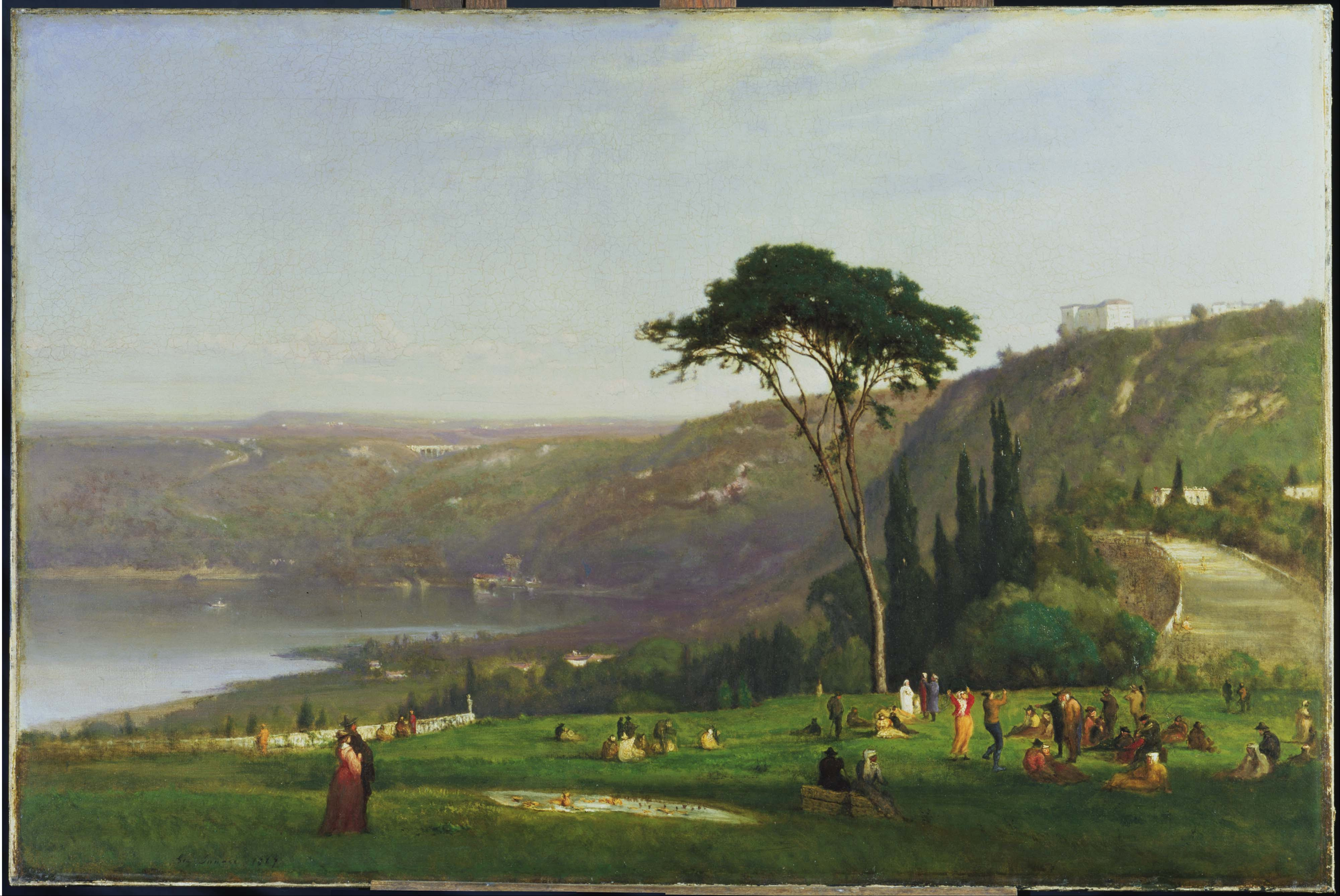
George Inness, Lake Albano, 1869. Phillips Collection

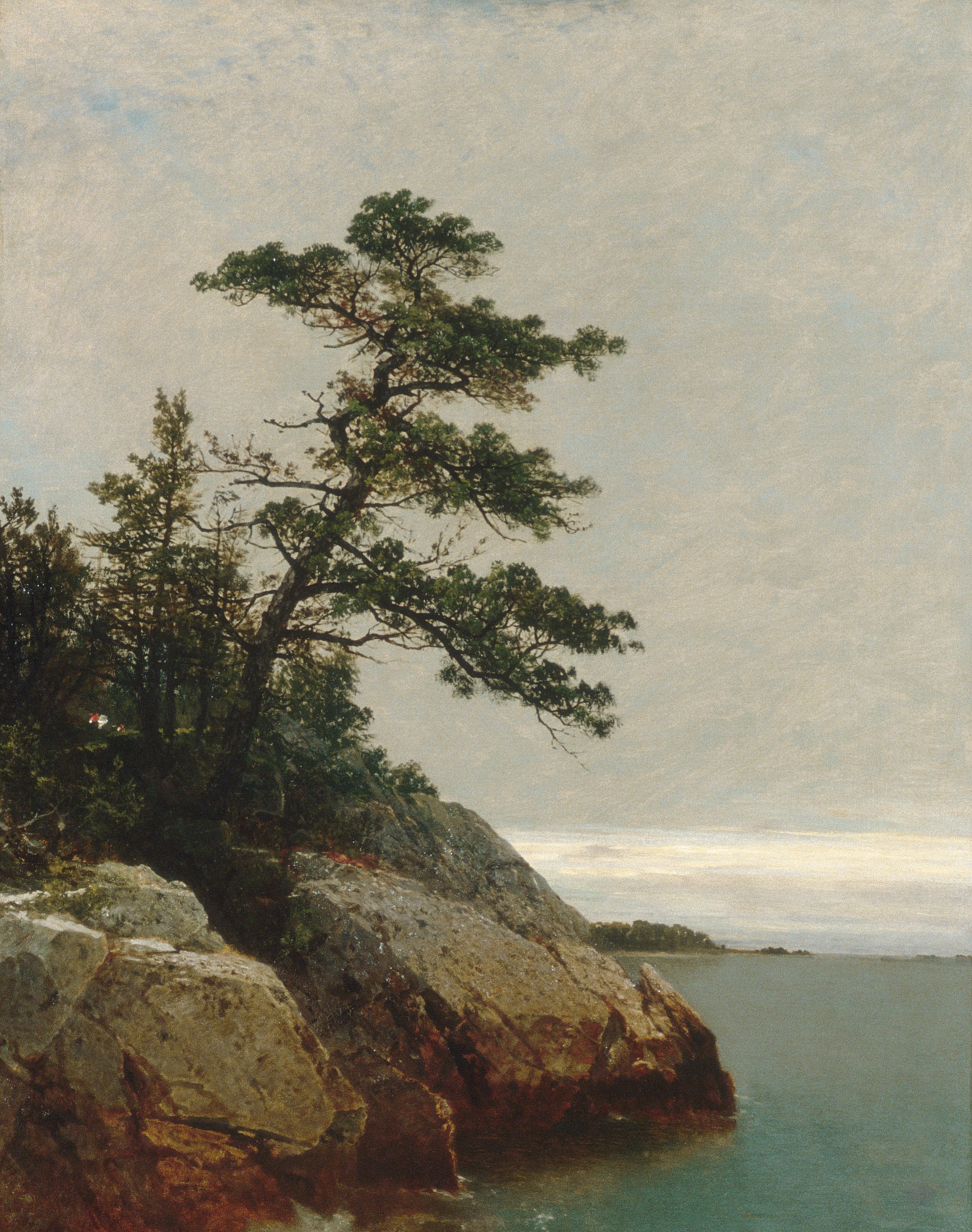
John Kensett, The Old Pine, Darien, Connecticut, c. 1872, Metropolitan Museum of Art, New York City

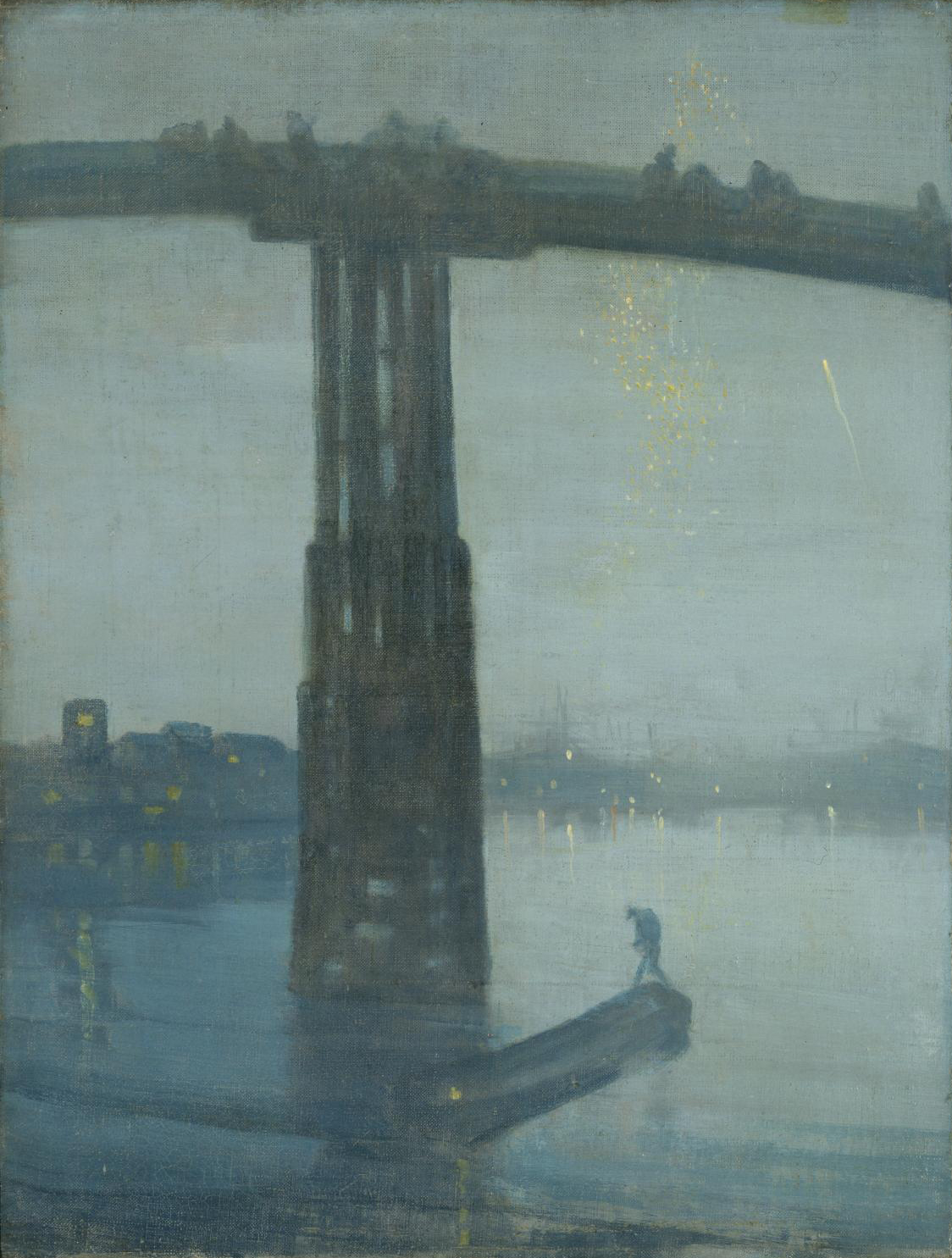
James Abbott McNeill Whistler, Nocturne: Blue and Gold - Old Battersea Bridge (1872), Tate Britain, London, England

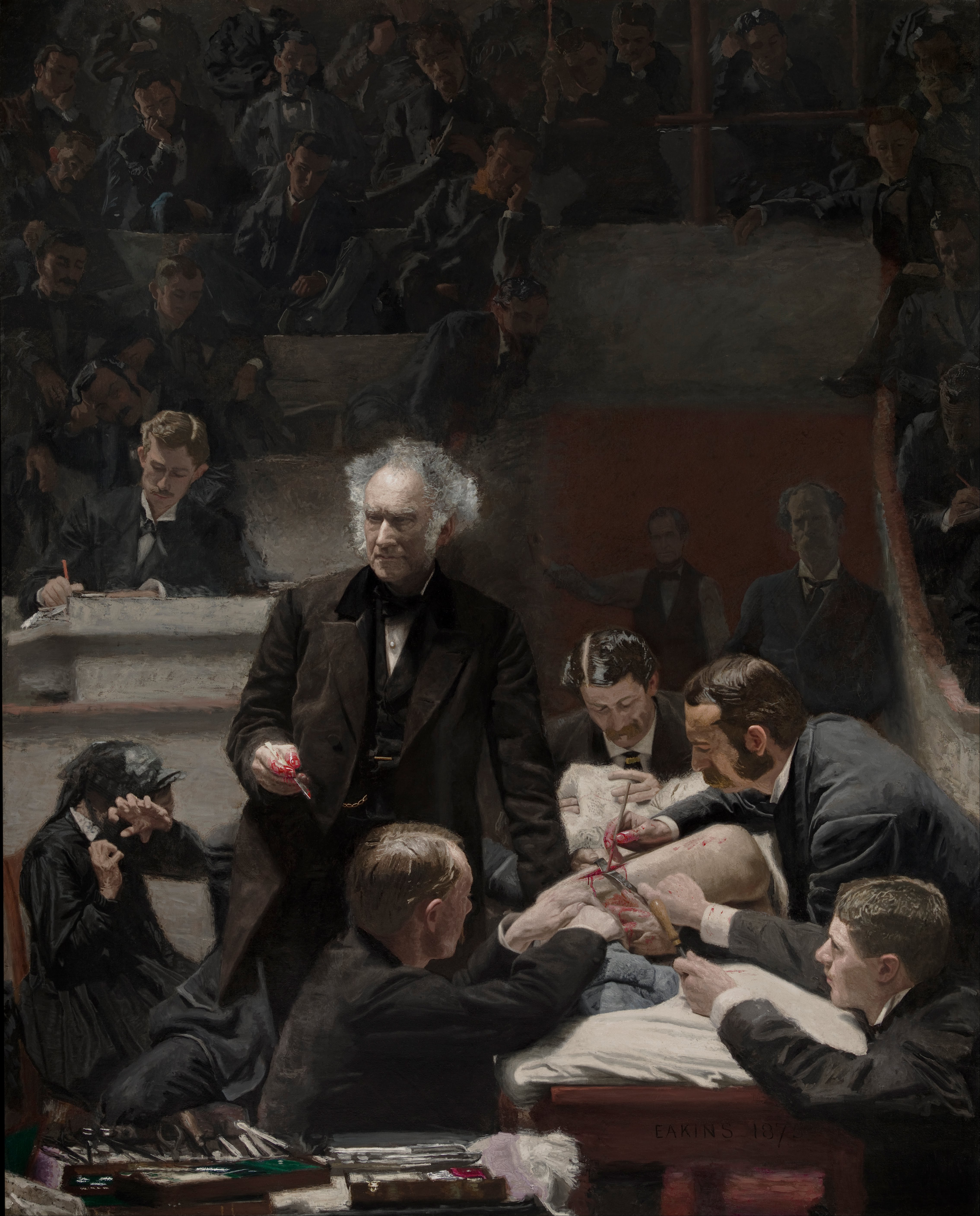
Thomas Eakins, The Gross Clinic, 1875, Philadelphia Museum of Art and the Pennsylvania Academy of the Fine Arts

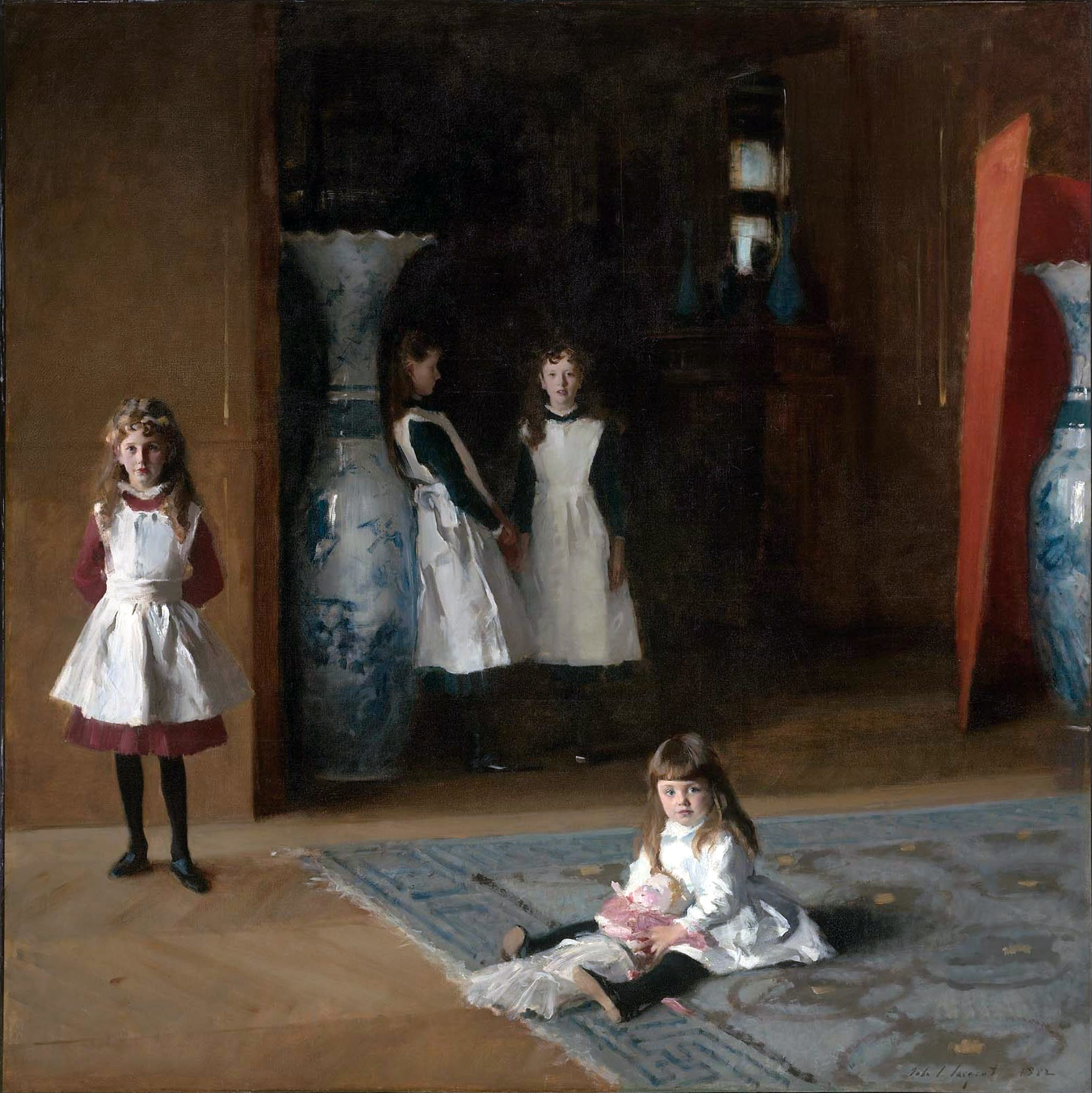
John Singer Sargent, The Daughters of Edward Darley Boit, 1882, Boston Museum of Fine Arts

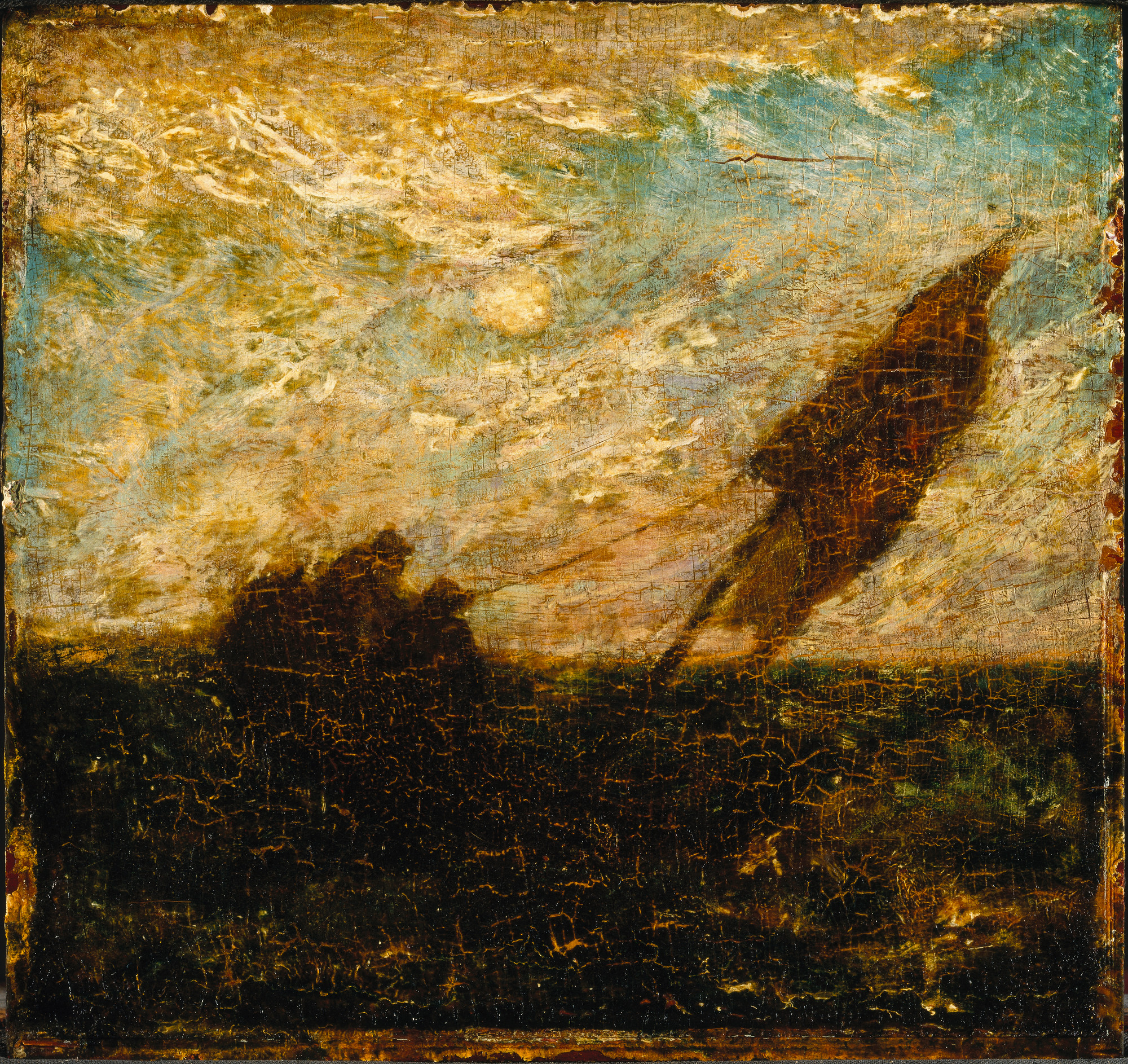
Albert Pinkham Ryder, The Waste of Waters is Their Field, early 1880s, Brooklyn Museum

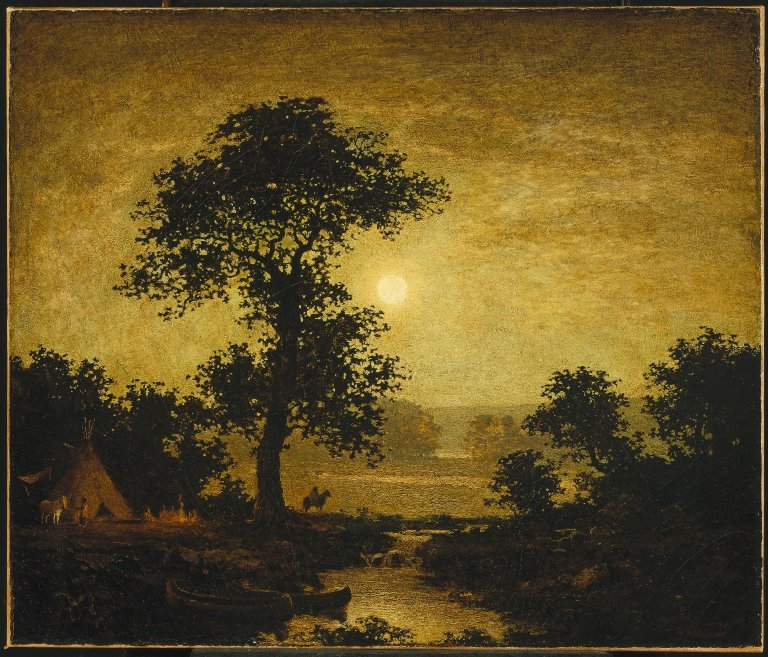
Ralph Albert Blakelock, Moonlight, 1885, Brooklyn Museum

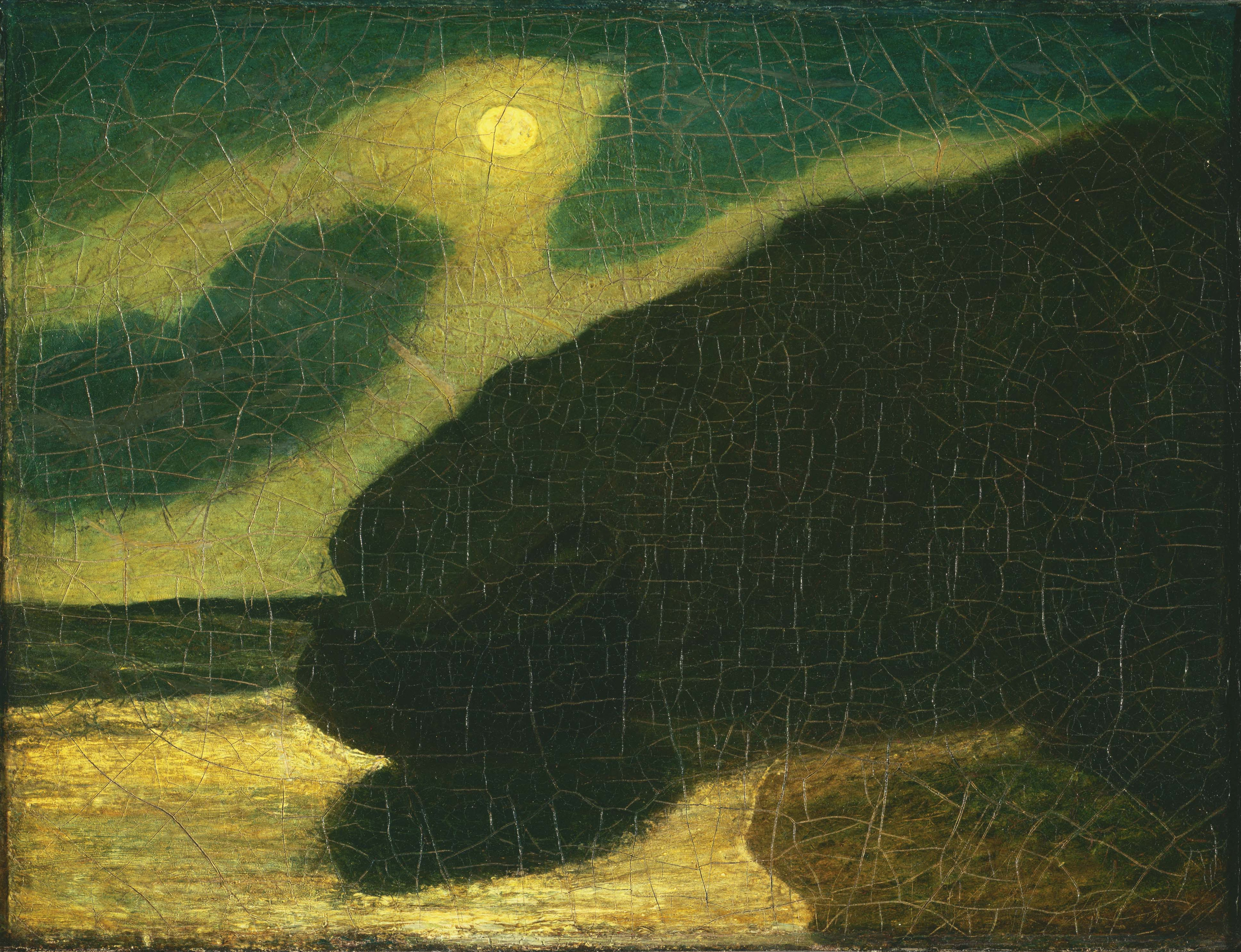
Albert Pinkham Ryder, Seacoast in Moonlight, 1890, the Phillips Collection, Washington, D.C.

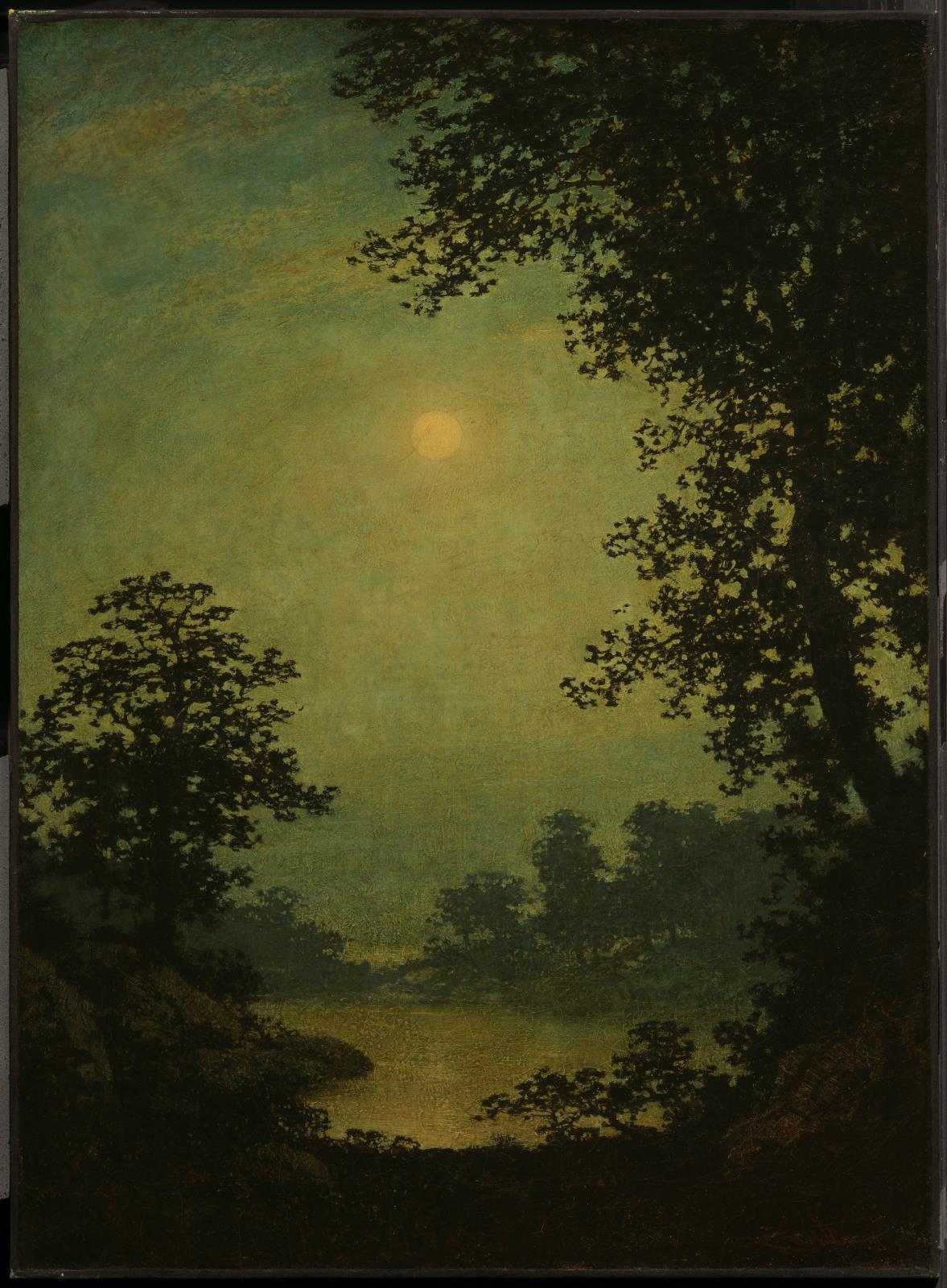
Ralph Albert Blakelock, Moonlight Sonata, 1889–1892, Museum of Fine Arts, Boston

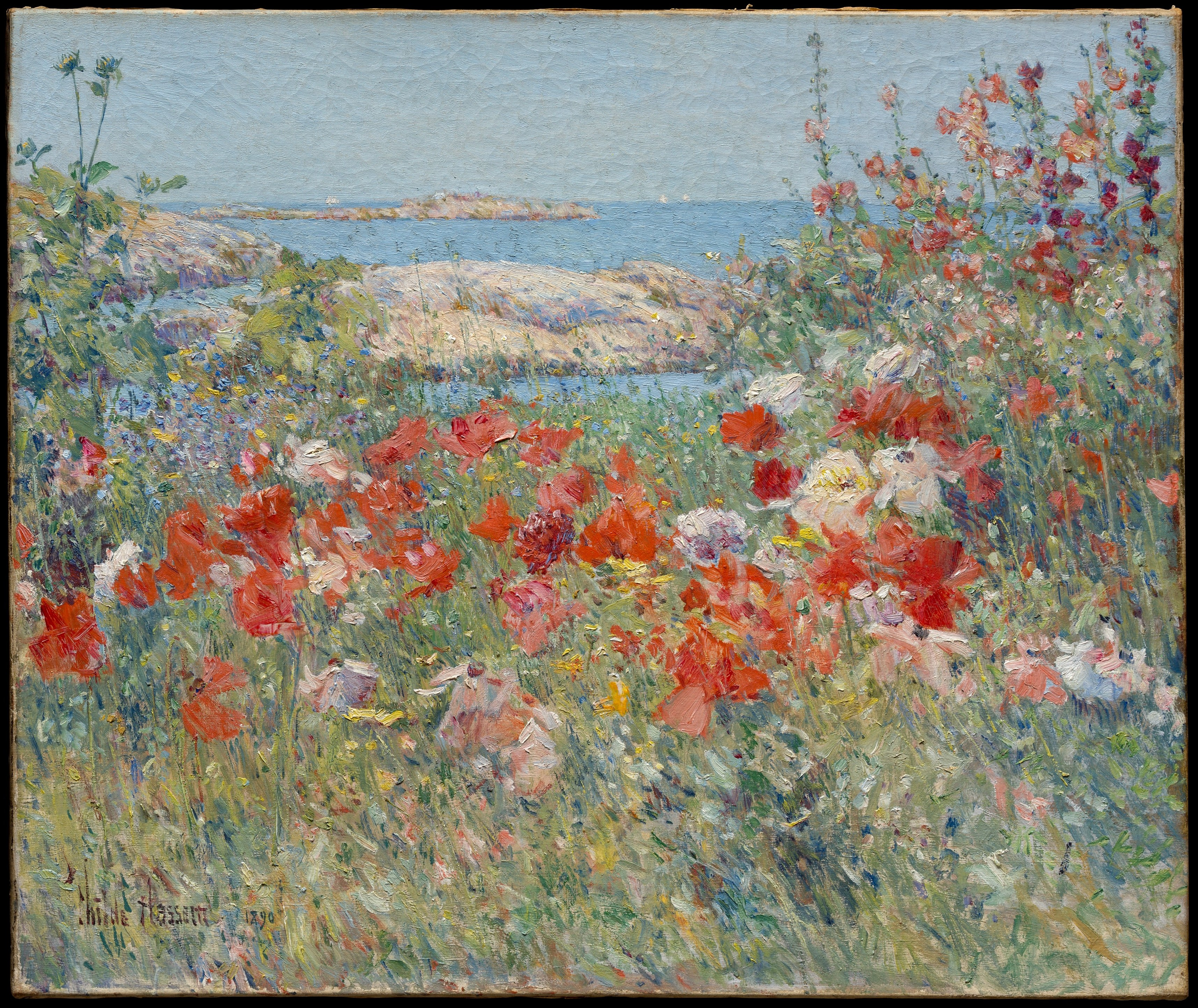
Childe Hassam, Celia Thaxter's Garden, 1890, The Metropolitan Museum of Art, New York City

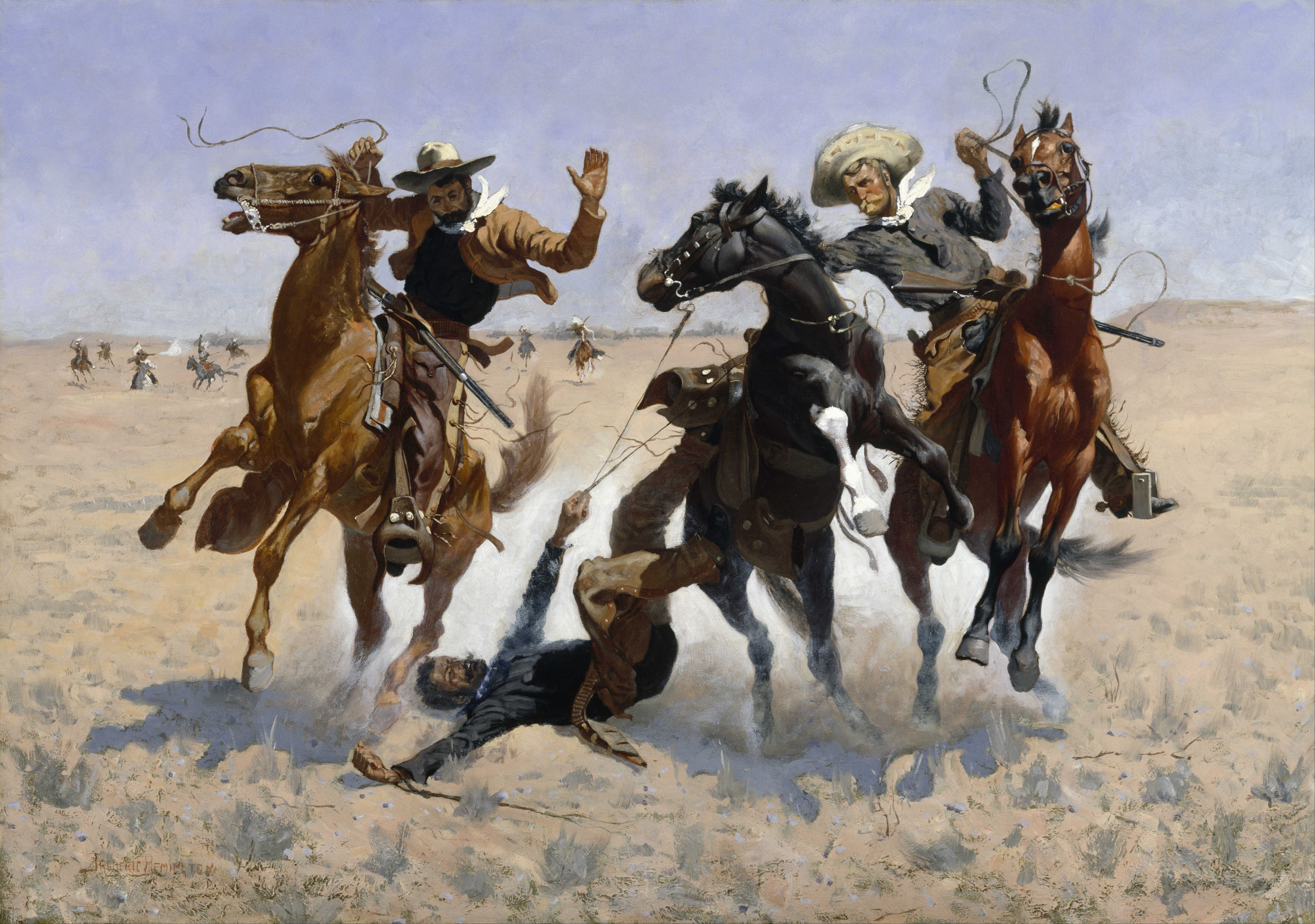
Frederic Remington, Aiding a Comrade, 1890, Museum of Fine Arts, Houston

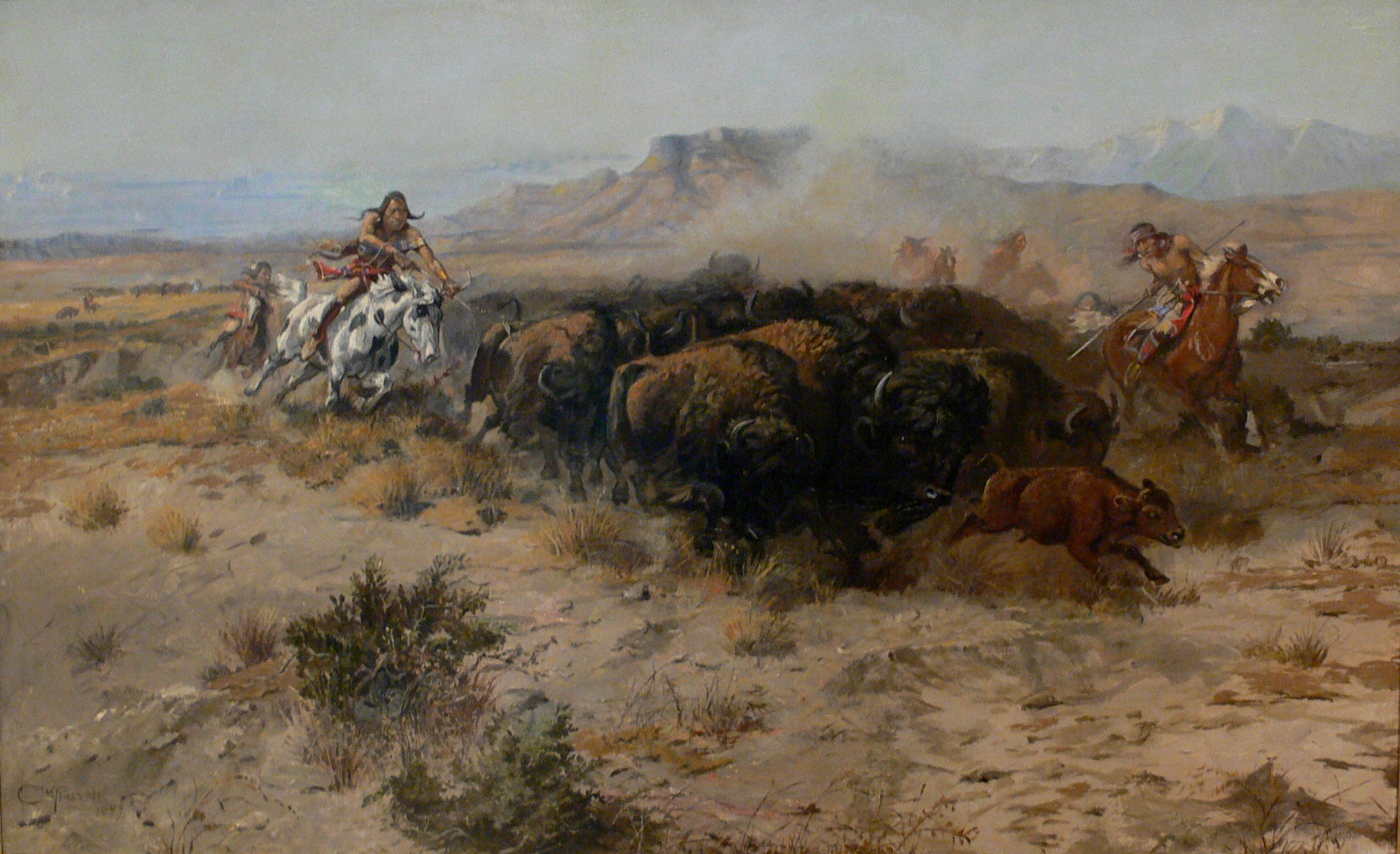
Charles M. Russell, The Buffalo Hunt, 1899, Amon Carter Museum of American Art

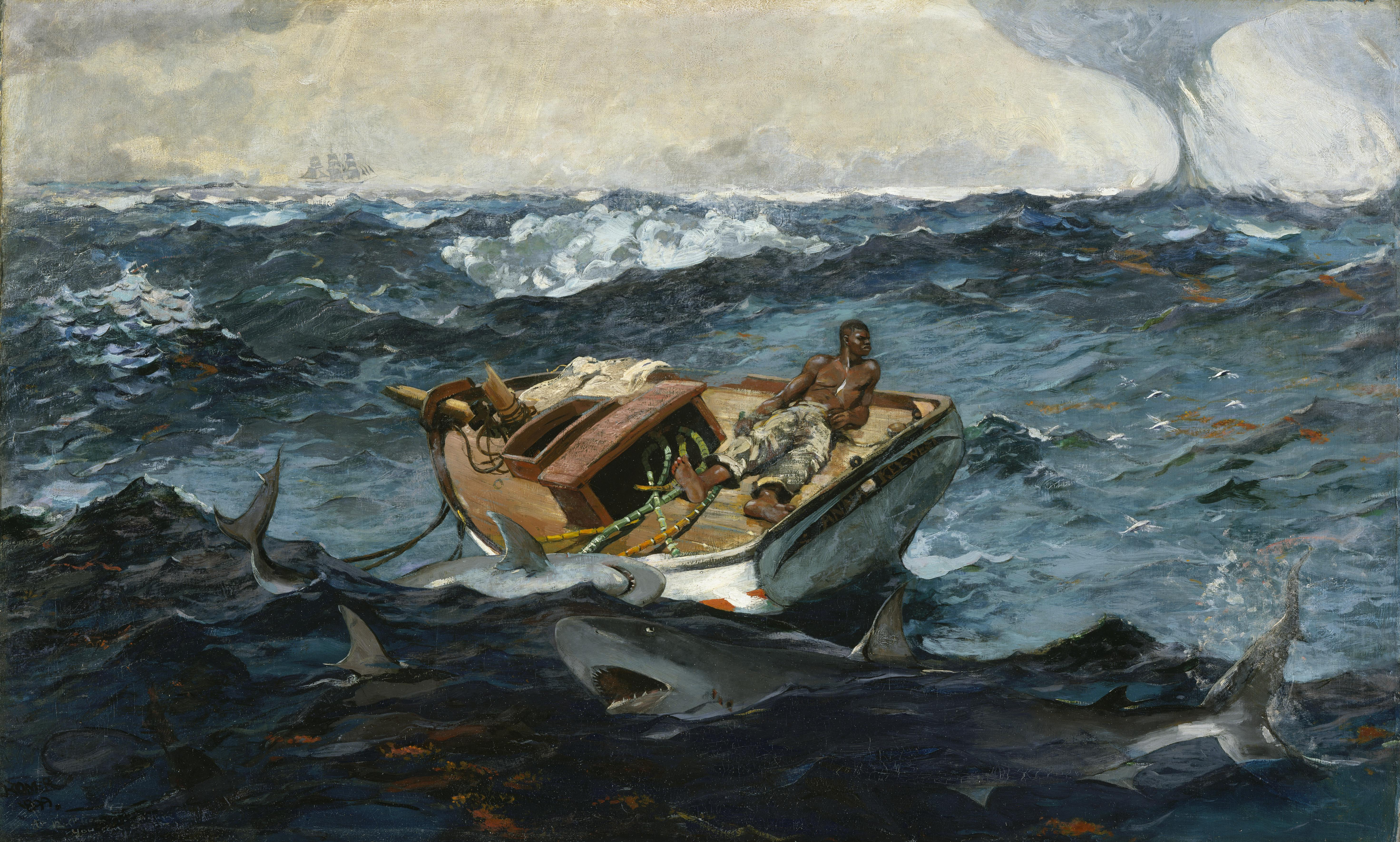
Winslow Homer, The Gulf Stream, 1899, oil on canvas, Metropolitan Museum of Art, New York City

== 20th century ==
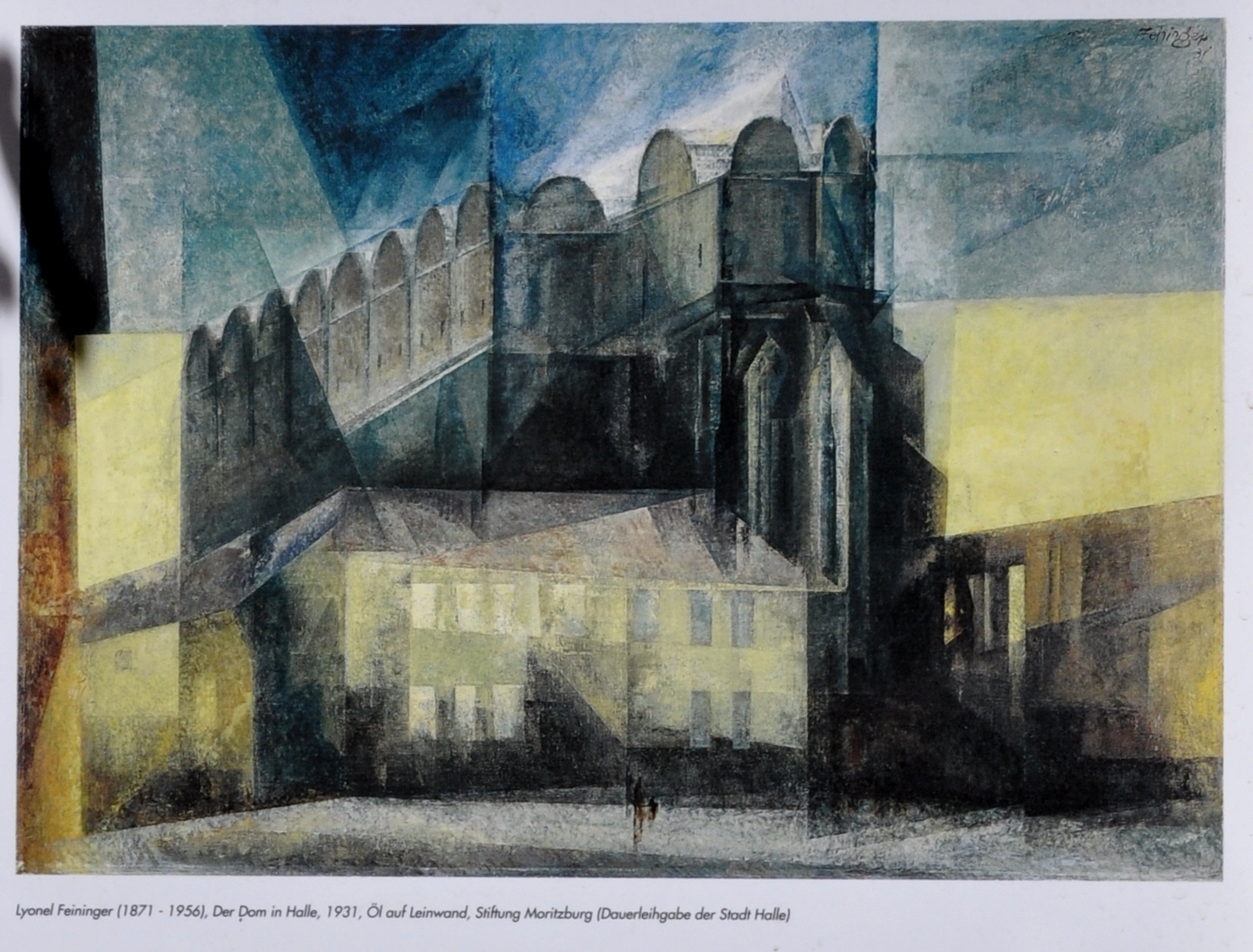
Lyonel Feininger, Dom in Halle, 1931, Cathedral of Halle, Germany

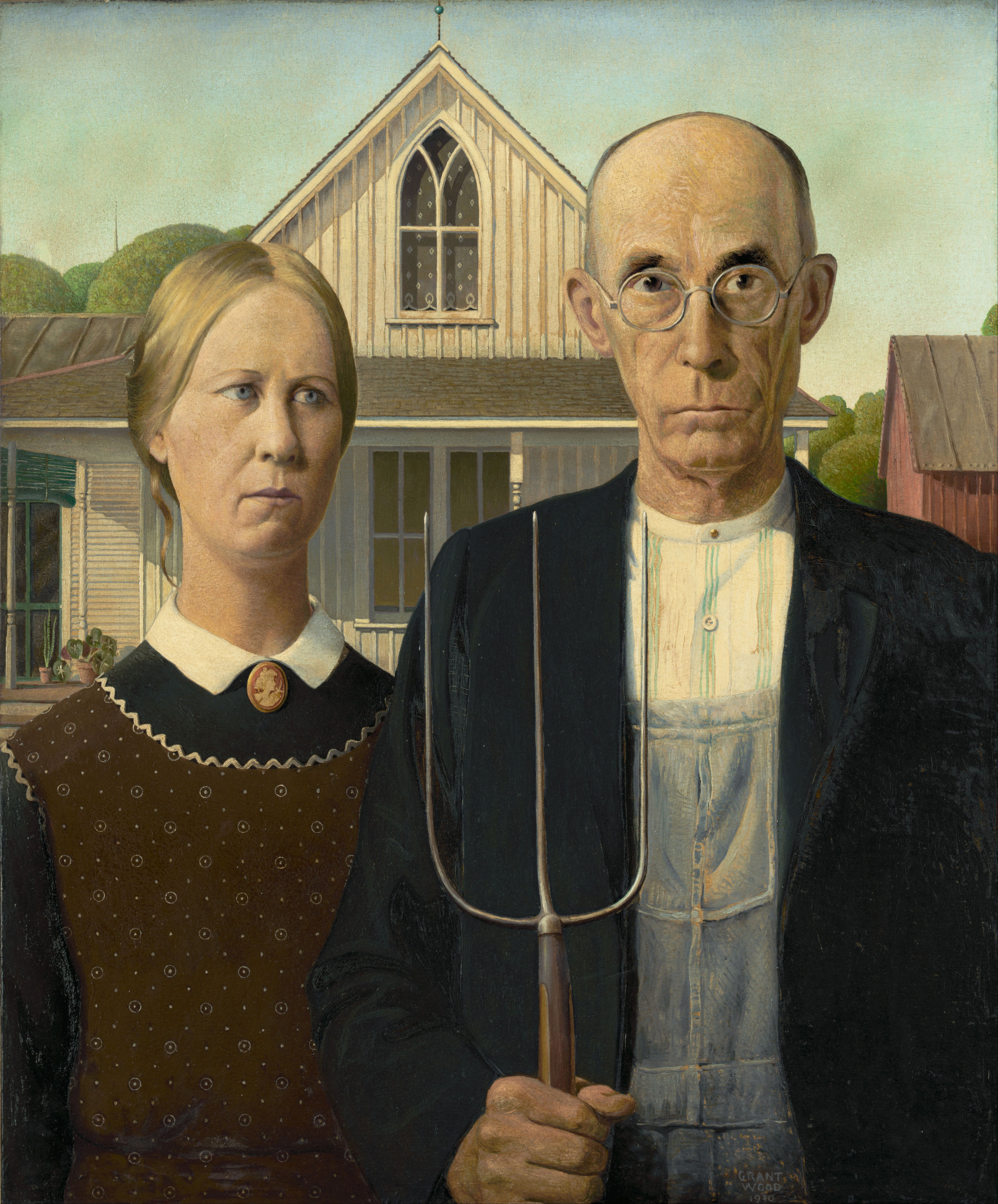
Grant Wood, American Gothic (1930), Art Institute of Chicago

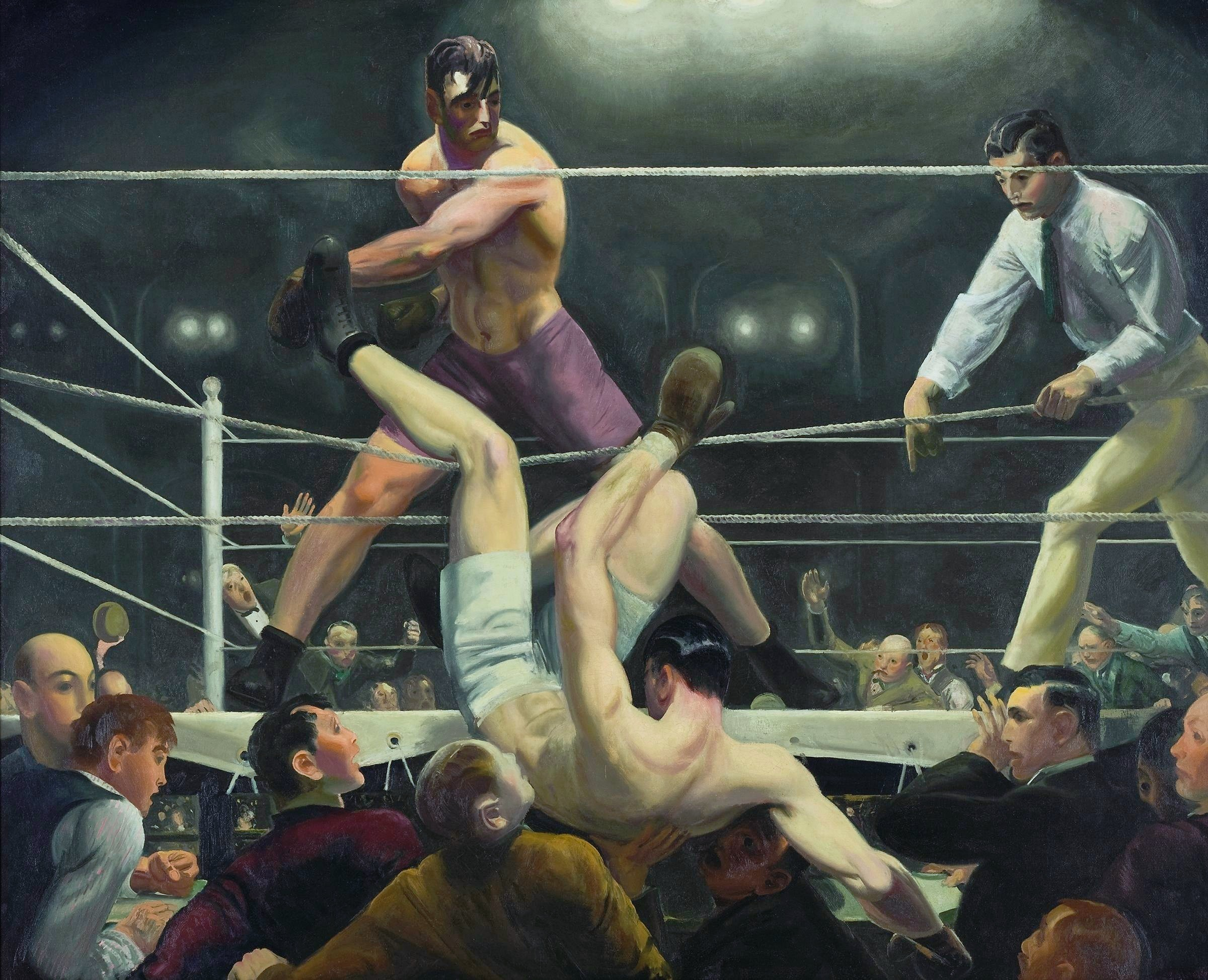
George Bellows, Dempsey and Firpo, 1924, Whitney Museum of American Art

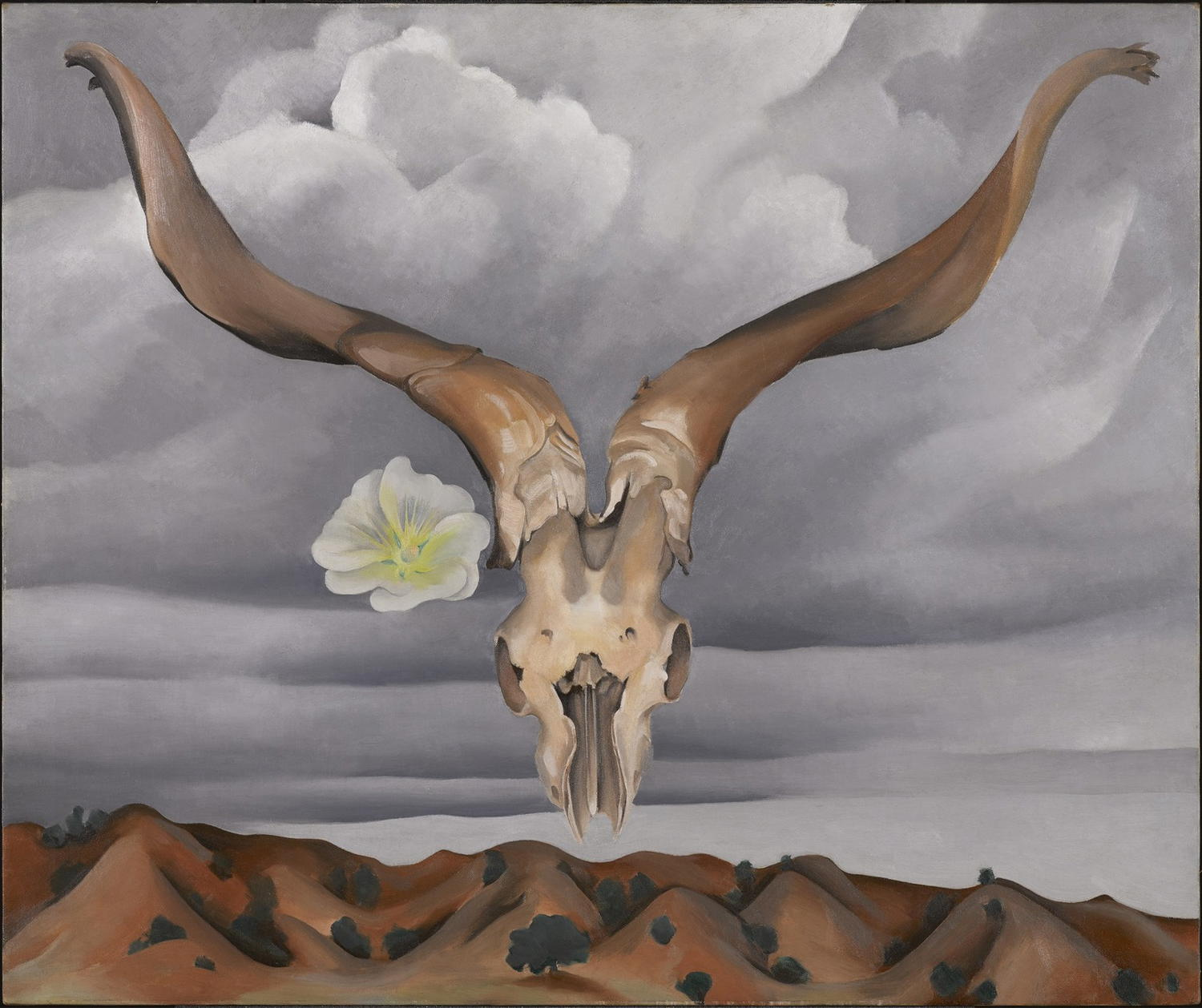
Georgia O'Keeffe, Ram's Head White Hollyhock and Little Hills, 1935, the Brooklyn Museum

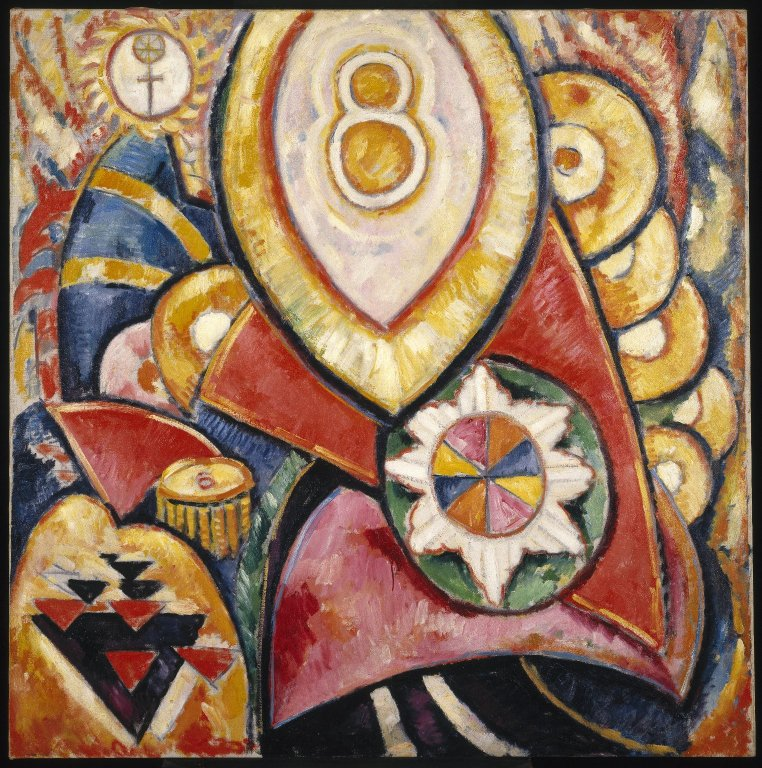
Marsden Hartley, Painting No. 48, 1913, Brooklyn Museum

Controversy soon became a way of life for American artists. In fact, much of American painting and sculpture since 1900 has been a series of revolts against tradition. "To hell with the artistic values," announced Robert Henri. He was the leader of what critics called the Ashcan School of painting, after the group's portrayals of the squalid aspects of city life.

American realism became the new direction for American visual artists at the turn of the 20th century. The Ashcan painters George Bellows, Everett Shinn, George Benjamin Luks, William Glackens, and John Sloan were among those who developed socially conscious imagery in their works. Photographer Alfred Stieglitz led the Photo-Secession movement which created pathways for photography as an emerging art form.

Ashcan School artists gave way to modernists arriving from Europe—the cubists and abstract painters promoted by Stieglitz at his 291 Gallery in New York City. John Marin, Marsden Hartley, Alfred Henry Maurer, Arthur B. Carles, Arthur Dove, Henrietta Shore, Stuart Davis, Wilhelmina Weber, Stanton Macdonald-Wright, Morgan Russell, Patrick Henry Bruce, Andrew Dasburg, Georgia O'Keeffe, and Gerald Murphy were some important early American modernist painters. Early modernist sculptors in America include William Zorach, Elie Nadelman, and Paul Manship. Florine Stettheimer developed an extremely personal faux-naif style.

After World War I many American artists rejected the modern trends emanating from the Armory Show and European influences such as those from the School of Paris. Instead they chose to adopt various—in some cases academic—styles of realism in depicting American urban and rural scenes. Grant Wood, Reginald Marsh, Guy Pène du Bois, and Charles Sheeler exemplify the realist tendency in different ways. Sheeler and the modernists Charles Demuth and Ralston Crawford were referred to as Precisionists for their sharply defined renderings of machines and architectural forms. Edward Hopper, who studied under Henri, developed an individual style of realism by concentrating on light and form, and avoiding overt social content.

=== American Southwest ===
Following the first World War, the completion of the Santa Fe Railroad enabled American settlers to travel across the west, as far as the California coast. Artists' colonies started growing up around Santa Fe and Taos, the artists' primary subject matter being the native people and landscapes of the Southwest.

Images of the Southwest became a popular form of advertising, used most significantly by the Santa Fe Railroad to entice settlers to come west and enjoy the "unsullied landscapes." Walter Ufer, Bert Geer Phillips, E. Irving Couse, William Henry Jackson, Marsden Hartley, Andrew Dasburg, and Georgia O'Keeffe were some of the more prolific artists of the Southwest. O'Keeffe, who was born in the late 19th century, became known for her paintings featuring flowers, bones, and landscapes of New Mexico as seen in Ram's Head White Hollyhock and Little Hills. O'Keeffe visited the Southwest in 1929 and moved there permanently in 1949; she lived and painted there until she died in 1986.

=== Harlem Renaissance (1920s–1930s) ===
The Harlem Renaissance was a significant development in American art. In the 1920s and 30s a generation of educated and politically astute African-American men and women emerged who sponsored literary societies and art and industrial exhibitions to combat racist stereotypes. The movement, which showcased the range of talents within African-American communities, included artists from across America but was centered in Harlem. The work of painter and graphic artist Aaron Douglas and photographer James VanDerZee became emblematic of the movement. Artists associated with the Harlem Renaissance include Romare Bearden, Jacob Lawrence, Charles Alston, Augusta Savage, Archibald Motley, Lois Mailou Jones, Palmer Hayden and Sargent Johnson.

=== New Deal art (1930s) ===
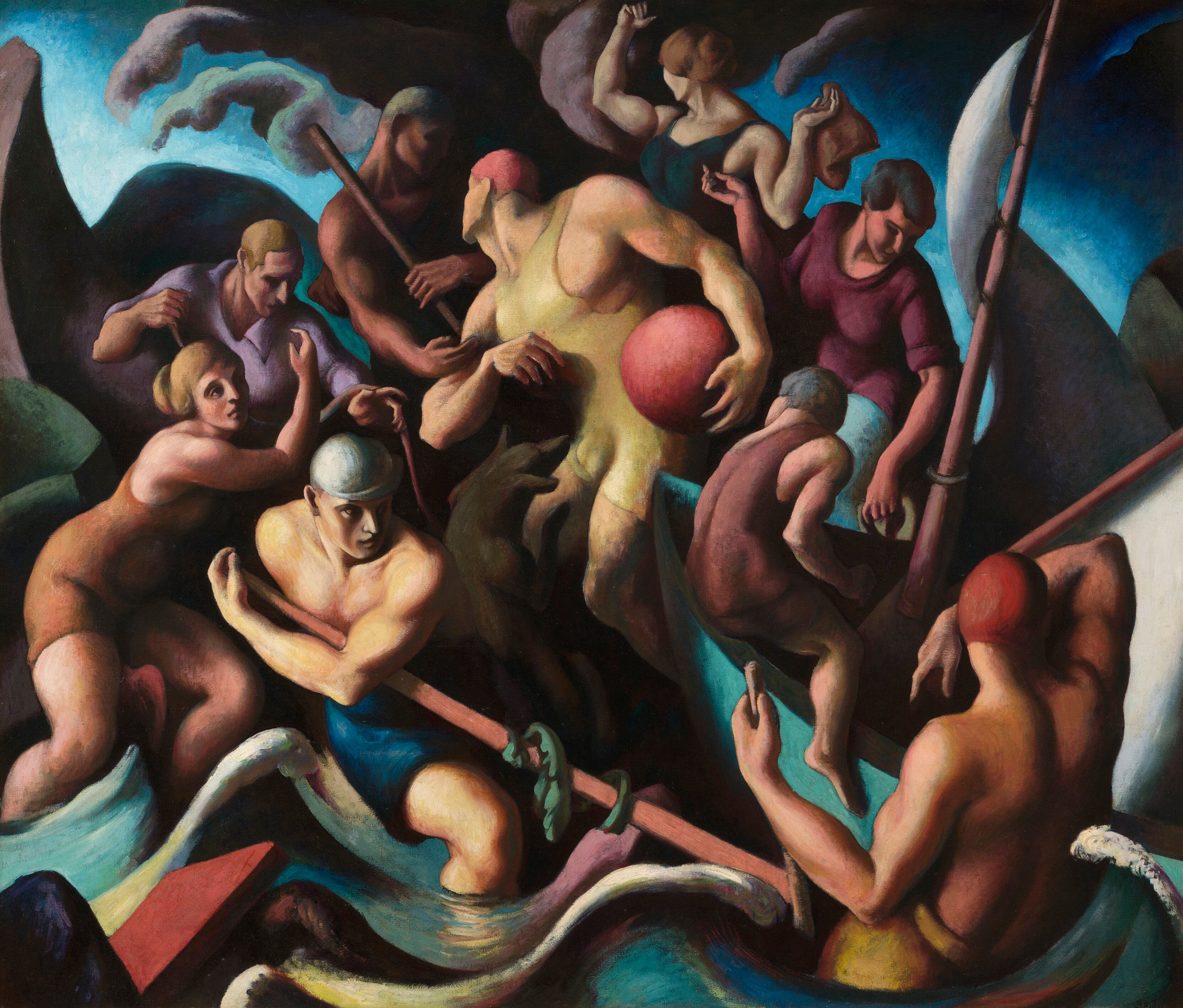
Thomas Hart Benton, People of Chilmark (Figure Composition), 1920, Hirshhorn Museum and Sculpture Garden, Washington, D.C.

When the Great Depression worsened, President Franklin D. Roosevelt's New Deal created several public arts programs. The purpose of the programs was to give work to artists and decorate public buildings, usually with a national theme. The first of these projects, the Public Works of Art Project (PWAP), was created after successful lobbying by the unemployed artists of the Artists Union. The PWAP lasted less than one year and produced nearly 15,000 works of art. It was followed by the Federal Art Project of the Works Progress Administration (FAP/WPA) in 1935, which funded some of the most well-known American artists.

The style of much of the public art commissioned by the WPA was influenced by the work of Diego Rivera and other artists of the contemporary Mexican muralism movement. Several separate and related movements began and developed during the Great Depression including American scene painting, Regionalism, and Social Realism. Thomas Hart Benton, John Steuart Curry, Grant Wood, Maxine Albro, Ben Shahn, Joseph Stella, Reginald Marsh, Isaac Soyer, Raphael Soyer, Spencer Baird Nichols and Jack Levine were some of the best-known artists.

Not all of the artists who emerged in the years between the wars were Regionalists or Social Realists; Milton Avery's paintings, often nearly abstract, had a significant influence on several of the younger artists who would soon become known as Abstract Expressionists. Joseph Cornell, inspired by Surrealism, created boxed assemblages incorporating found objects and collage.

=== Abstract expressionism ===
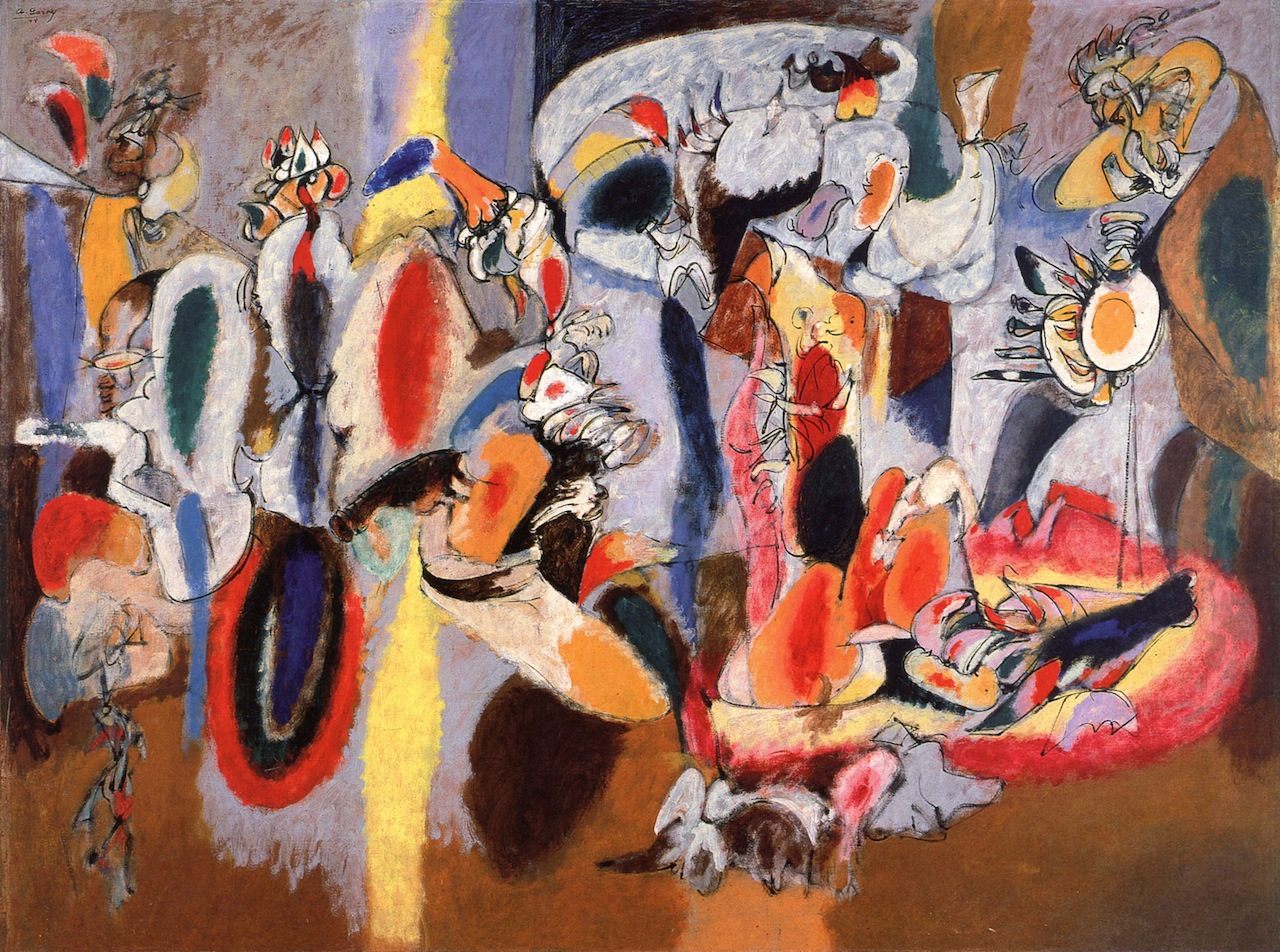
Arshile Gorky, The Liver is the Cock's Comb (1944), oil on canvas, 73 1/4 in × 98 in (186 cm × 249 cm), Albright–Knox Art Gallery, Buffalo, New York. The painting represents the peak of Gorky's achievement and his individual style, after he had emerged from the influence of Cézanne and Picasso.

In the years after World War II, a group of New York artists formed the first American movement to exert major influence internationally: abstract expressionism. This term, which had first been used in 1919 in Berlin, was used again in 1946 by Robert Coates in The New York Times, and was taken up by the two major art critics of that time, Harold Rosenberg and Clement Greenberg. It has been criticized as too large and paradoxical, yet the common definition implies the use of abstract art to express feelings, emotions, what is within the artist, and not what stands without.

The first generation of abstract expressionists included Jackson Pollock, Willem de Kooning, Mark Rothko, Franz Kline, Arshile Gorky, Robert Motherwell, Clyfford Still, Barnett Newman, Adolph Gottlieb, Phillip Guston, Ad Reinhardt, James Brooks, Richard Pousette-Dart, William Baziotes, Mark Tobey, Bradley Walker Tomlin, Theodoros Stamos, Jack Tworkov, Wilhelmina Weber Furlong, David Smith, and Hans Hofmann, among others. Milton Avery, Lee Krasner, Louise Bourgeois, Alexander Calder, Tony Smith, Morris Graves and others were also related, important and influential artists during that period.

Though the numerous artists encompassed by this label had widely different styles, contemporary critics found several common points between them. Gorky, Pollock, de Kooning, Kline, Hofmann, Motherwell, Gottlieb, Rothko, Still, Guston, and others were an American painters associated with the abstract expressionist movement and in most cases Action painting (as seen in Kline's Painting Number 2, 1954); as part of the New York School in the 1940s and 1950s.

Many first generation abstract expressionists were influenced both by the cubists' works (which they knew from photographs in art reviews and by seeing the works at the 291 Gallery or the Armory Show), by the European surrealists, and by Pablo Picasso, Joan Miró and Henri Matisse as well as the Americans Milton Avery, John D. Graham, and Hans Hofmann. Most of them abandoned formal composition and representation of real objects. Often the abstract expressionists decided to try instinctual, intuitive, spontaneous arrangements of space, line, shape and color. Abstract Expressionism can be characterized by two major elements: the large size of the canvases used (partially inspired by Mexican frescoes and the works they made for the WPA in the 1930s), and the strong and unusual use of brushstrokes and experimental paint application with a new understanding of process.

==== Color Field painting ====
The emphasis and intensification of color and large open expanses of surface were two of the principles applied to the movement called color field painting. Ad Reinhardt, Adolph Gottlieb, Mark Rothko, Clyfford Still and Barnett Newman were categorized as such. Another movement was called action painting, characterized by spontaneous reaction, powerful brushstrokes, dripped and splashed paint and the strong physical movements used in the production of a painting. Pollock is an example of an action painter: his creative process, incorporating thrown and dripped paint from a stick or poured directly from the can, revolutionized painting methods.

Willem de Kooning famously said about Pollock "he broke the ice for the rest of us." Ironically Pollock's large repetitious expanses of linear fields are characteristic of color field painting as well, as art critic Michael Fried wrote in his essay for the catalog of Three American painters: Kenneth Noland, Jules Olitski, Frank Stella at the Fogg Art Museum in 1965. Despite the disagreements between art critics, Abstract Expressionism marks a turning point in the history of American art: the 1940s and 1950s saw international attention shift from European (Parisian) art, to American (New York) art.

Color field painting continued as a movement in the 1960s, as Morris Louis, Jules Olitski, Kenneth Noland, Gene Davis, Helen Frankenthaler, and others sought to make paintings which would eliminate superfluous rhetoric with repetition, stripes and large, flat areas of color.

=== After abstract expressionism ===
Mark Rothko, Untitled (Black on Grey), 1969-70, Solomon R. Guggenheim Museum, New York City. One of Rothko's final paintings which relate closely to both Minimal art and Color Field painting.

During the 1950s abstract painting in America evolved into movements such as Neo-Dada, Post painterly abstraction, Op Art, hard-edge painting, Minimal art, Shaped canvas painting, Lyrical Abstraction, and the continuation of Abstract expressionism. As a response to the tendency toward abstraction imagery emerged through various new movements like Pop Art, the Bay Area Figurative Movement and later in the 1970s Neo-expressionism.

Lyrical abstraction along with the Fluxus movement and Postminimalism (a term first coined by Robert Pincus-Witten in the pages of Artforum in 1969) sought to expand the boundaries of abstract painting and Minimalism by focusing on process, new materials and new ways of expression. Postminimalism often incorporating industrial materials, raw materials, fabrications, found objects, installation, serial repetition, and often with references to Dada and Surrealism is best exemplified in the sculptures of Eva Hesse.

Lyrical abstraction, conceptual art, Postminimalism, Earth Art, Video, Performance art, Installation art, along with the continuation of Fluxus, Abstract Expressionism, Color Field Painting, Hard-edge painting, Minimal Art, Op art, Pop Art, Photorealism and New Realism extended the boundaries of Contemporary Art in the mid-1960s through the 1970s. Lyrical abstraction shares similarities with Color Field Painting and Abstract Expressionism, especially in the freewheeling usage of paint texture and surface. Direct drawing, calligraphic use of line, the effects of brushed, splattered, stained, squeegeed, poured, and splashed paint superficially resemble the effects seen in Abstract Expressionism and Color Field Painting. However the styles are markedly different.

During the 1960s, 1970s and 1980s painters as powerful and influential as Adolph Gottlieb, Phillip Guston, Lee Krasner, Cy Twombly, Robert Rauschenberg, Jasper Johns, Richard Diebenkorn, Josef Albers, Elmer Bischoff, Agnes Martin, Al Held, Sam Francis, Barnett Newman, Kenneth Noland, Jules Olitski, Ellsworth Kelly, Morris Louis, Gene Davis, Frank Stella, Joan Mitchell, Friedel Dzubas, Paul Jenkins, Larry Poons and younger artists like Brice Marden, Robert Mangold, Sam Gilliam, Sean Scully, Elizabeth Murray, Walter Darby Bannard, Larry Zox, Ronnie Landfield, Ronald Davis, Dan Christensen, Susan Rothenberg, Ross Bleckner, Richard Tuttle, Julian Schnabel, Peter Halley, Jean-Michel Basquiat, Eric Fischl and dozens of others produced vital and influential paintings.

=== Other modern American movements ===
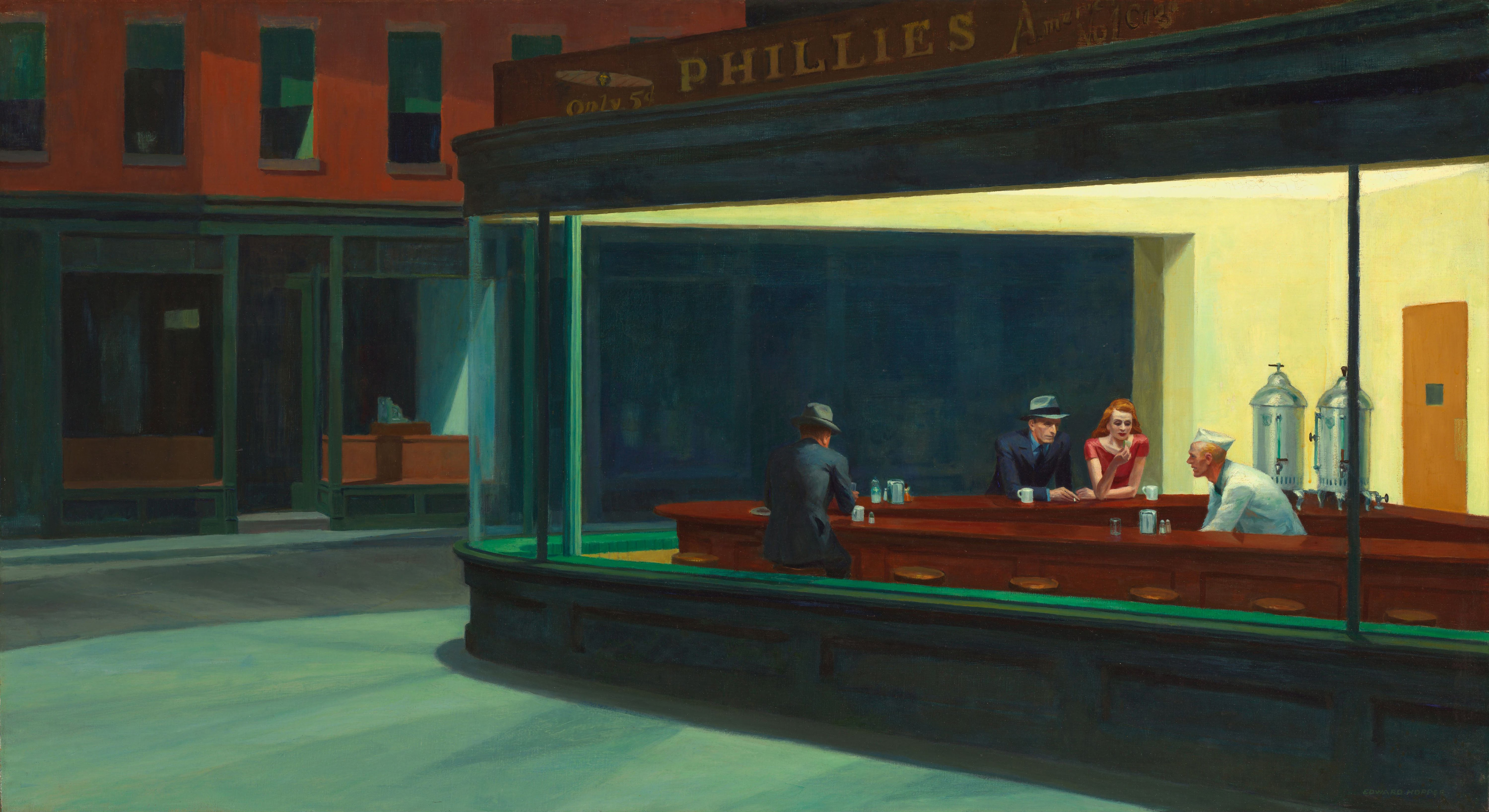
Nighthawks (1942) by Edward Hopper is one of his best-known works, Art Institute of Chicago.

Members of the next artistic generation favored a different form of abstraction: works of mixed media. Among them were Robert Rauschenberg and Jasper Johns, who used photos, newsprint, and discarded objects in their compositions. Pop artists such as Andy Warhol, Larry Rivers, and Roy Lichtenstein, reproduced, with satiric care, everyday objects and images of American popular culture—Coca-Cola bottles, soup cans, comic strips.

Realism has also been continually popular in the United States, despite modernism's impact; the realist tendency is evident in the city scenes of Edward Hopper, the rural imagery of Andrew Wyeth, and the illustrations of Norman Rockwell. In certain places Abstract Expressionism never caught on; for example, in Chicago, the dominant art style was grotesque, symbolic realism, as exemplified by the Chicago Imagists Cosmo Campoli, Jim Nutt, Ed Paschke, and Nancy Spero.

=== Contemporary art into the 21st century ===
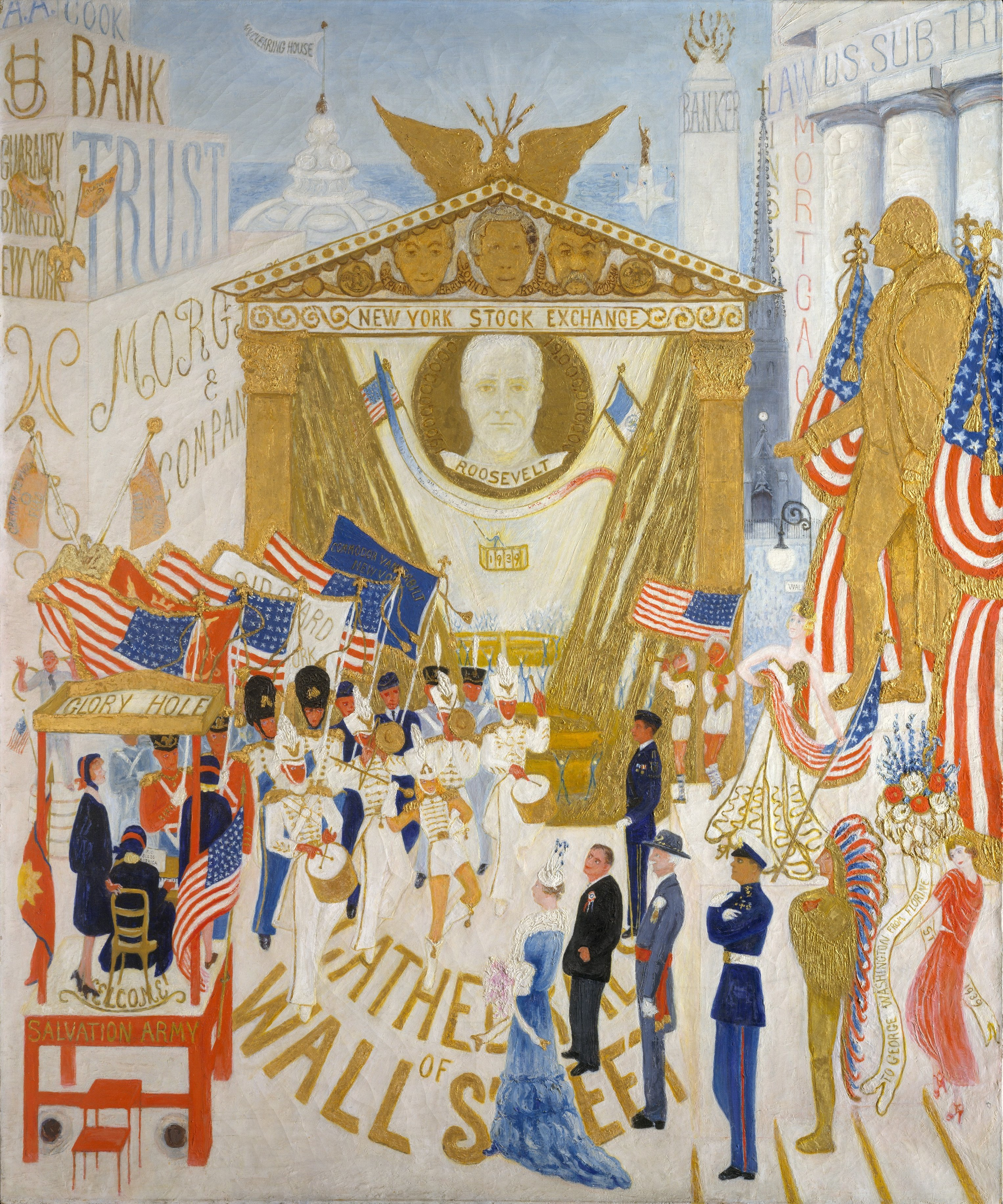
The Cathedrals of Wall Street, 1939, oil on canvas by Florine Stettheimer

At the beginning of the 21st century contemporary art in the United States developed in several contiguous movements, characterized by the idea of Cultural pluralism. This combination of unique cultures lead to a lack of consensus on the representative style of the era. There is an anything goes attitude that prevails with no firm and clear direction. The works produced in this period display a wide variety of styles and aesthetic choices that continue to be enjoyed and studied to this day.

Hard-edge painting, Geometric abstraction, Appropriation, Hyperrealism, Photorealism, Expressionism, Minimalism, Lyrical Abstraction, Pop art, Op art, Abstract Expressionism, Color Field painting, Monochrome painting, Neo-expressionism, Collage, Intermedia painting, Assemblage painting, Digital painting, Postmodern painting, Neo-Dada painting, Shaped canvas painting, environmental mural painting, Graffiti, traditional figure painting, Landscape painting, Portrait painting, are a few continuing and current directions in painting at the beginning of the 21st century.

== Notable figures ==
A few American artists of note include: Ansel Adams, John James Audubon, Milton Avery, Jean-Michel Basquiat, Thomas Hart Benton, Albert Bierstadt, Alexander Calder, Mary Cassatt, Frederic Edwin Church, Chuck Close, Thomas Cole, Robert Crumb, Edward S. Curtis, Richard Diebenkorn, Thomas Eakins, Jules Feiffer, Lyonel Feininger, Helen Frankenthaler, Arshile Gorky, Keith Haring, Marsden Hartley, Al Hirschfeld, Hans Hofmann, Winslow Homer, Edward Hopper, Jasper Johns, Georgia O'Keeffe, Jack Kirby, Franz Kline, Willem de Kooning, Lee Krasner, Dorothea Lange, Roy Lichtenstein, Morris Louis, John Marin, Agnes Martin, Joan Mitchell, Grandma Moses, Robert Motherwell, Nampeyo, Kenneth Noland, Jackson Pollock, Man Ray, Robert Rauschenberg, Frederic Remington, Norman Rockwell, Mark Rothko, Albert Pinkham Ryder, John Singer Sargent, Cindy Sherman, David Smith, Frank Stella, Clyfford Still, Gilbert Stuart, Louis Comfort Tiffany, Cy Twombly, Andy Warhol, Grant Wood, Frank Lloyd Wright, and Andrew Wyeth.

== See also ==
- Aesthetics
- Architecture of United States
- Art education in the United States
- Cinema of the United States
- History of painting
- Ledger art
- List of paintings of George Washington
- List of paintings of John Adams
- List of paintings of Thomas Jefferson
- Modern art museums in the United States
- Museums of American art
- National Museum of the American Indian
- Native American museums in New York
- Photography in the United States of America
- Sculpture of the United States
- Synchromism
- Timeline of Native American art history
- Timeline of 20th century printmaking in America
- Visual arts of Chicago
- Western painting

== Sources ==
- American paradise: the world of the Hudson River school. New York: The Metropolitan Museum of Art. 1987. ISBN 9780870994968.
- Avery, Kevin J. Late Eighteenth-Century American Drawings. The Metropolitan Museum Of Art. 2000-2011 The Metropolitan Museum Of Art
- Bernet, Claus; Nothnagle, Alan L.: Christliche Kunst aus den USA, Norderstedt 2015, ISBN 978-3-7386-1339-1.
- Mayer, Lance and Myers, Gay. American Painters on Technique: The Colonial Period to 1860. Los Angeles: Getty Publications, 2011. ISBN 978-1-60606-077-3
- Mayer, Lance and Myers, Gay. American Painters on Technique: 1860-1945. Los Angeles: Getty Publications, 2013. ISBN 978-1-60606-135-0
- Pohl, Frances K. Framing America. A Social History of American Art. New York: Thames & Hudson, 2002 (pages 74–84, 118–122, 366–365, 385, 343–344, 350–351)
- The United States of America. New York: The Metropolitan Museum of Art. 1987. ISBN 0870994166.
