= George Bellows =

American painter (1882–1925)

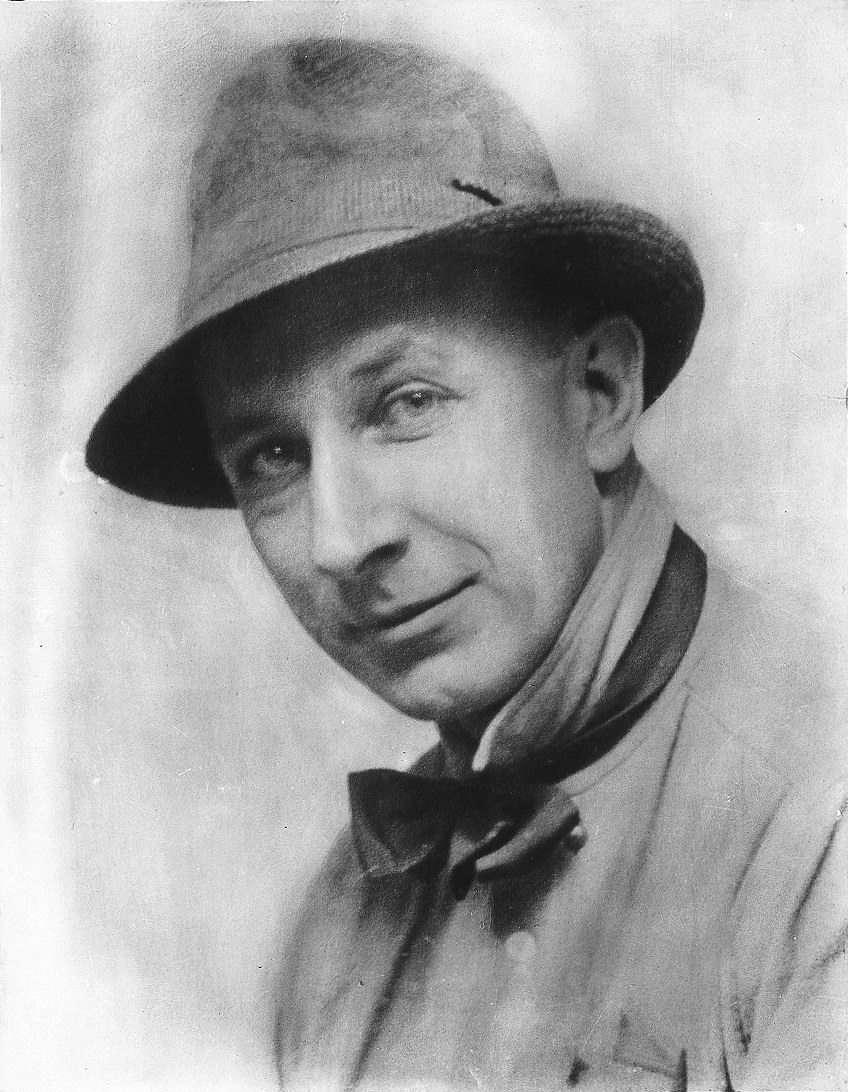
- Born: George Wesley Bellows; August 12, or August 19, 1882; Columbus, Ohio, U.S.
- Died: January 8, 1925 (aged 42); New York City, New York, U.S.
- Resting place: Green-Wood Cemetery
- Education: Robert Henri
- Known for: Painting
- Movement: Ashcan School; The Eight; American realism

George Wesley Bellows (August 12 or August 19, 1882 – January 8, 1925) was an American realist painter, known for his bold depictions of urban life in New York City. He became, according to the Columbus Museum of Art, "the most acclaimed American artist of his generation".

== Youth ==
George Wesley Bellows was born and raised in Columbus, Ohio. He was the only child of George Bellows and Anna Wilhelmina Smith Bellows (he had a half-sister, Laura, 18 years his senior). He was born four years after his parents married, at the ages of fifty (George) and forty (Anna). His mother was the daughter of a whaling captain based in Sag Harbor, Long Island, and his family returned there for their summer vacations. He began drawing well before kindergarten, and his elementary–school teachers often asked him to decorate their classroom blackboards at Thanksgiving and Christmas.

At age 10, George took to athletics, and trained to be a baseball and basketball player. He became good enough at both sports to play semipro ball for years afterward. During his senior year, a baseball scout from the Indianapolis team made him an offer. He declined, opting to enroll at Ohio State University (1901–1904). There he played for the baseball and basketball teams, and provided illustrations for the Makio, the school's student yearbook. He was encouraged to become a professional baseball player, and he worked as a commercial illustrator while a student and continued to accept magazine assignments throughout his life. Despite these opportunities in athletics and commercial art, Bellows desired success as a painter, although his parents didn't encourage it. He left Ohio State in 1904, just before he was to graduate, and moved to New York City to study art.

Bellows was soon a student of Robert Henri, who at the time was teaching at the New York School of Art. While studying there, Bellows became associated with Henri's "The Eight" and the Ashcan School, a group of artists who advocated painting contemporary American society in all its forms. By 1906, Bellows and fellow art student Edward Keefe had set up a studio at 1947 Broadway.

== New York ==
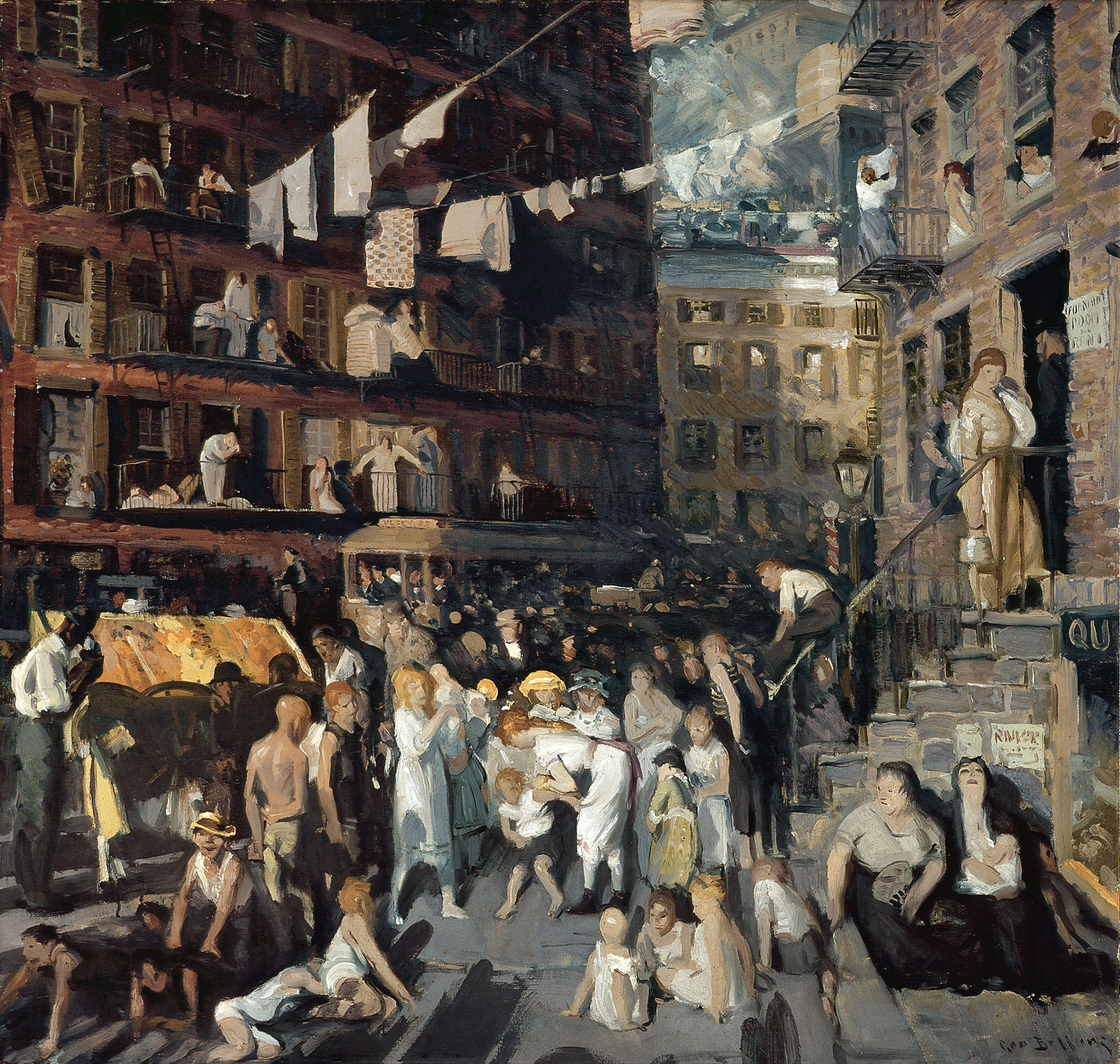
Cliff Dwellers, (1913), Los Angeles County Museum of Art

Bellows first achieved widespread notice in 1908, when he and other pupils of Henri organized an exhibition of mostly urban studies. While many critics considered these to be crudely painted, others found them welcomely audacious, a step beyond the work of his teacher. Bellows taught at the Art Students League of New York in 1909, although he was more interested in pursuing a career as a painter. His fame grew as he contributed to other nationally recognized juried shows.

Bellows's urban New York scenes depicted the crudity and chaos of working-class people and neighborhoods, and satirized the upper classes. From 1907 through 1915, he executed a series of paintings depicting New York City under snowfall. In these paintings Bellows developed his strong sense of light and visual texture, exhibiting a stark contrast between the blue and white expanses of snow and the rough and grimy surfaces of city structures, and creating an aesthetically ironic image of the equally rough and grimy men struggling to clear away the nuisance of the pure snow. However, Bellows's series of paintings portraying amateur boxing matches were arguably his signature contribution to art history. They are characterized by dark atmospheres, through which the bright, roughly laid brushstrokes of the human figures vividly strike with a strong sense of motion and direction.

== Social and political themes ==
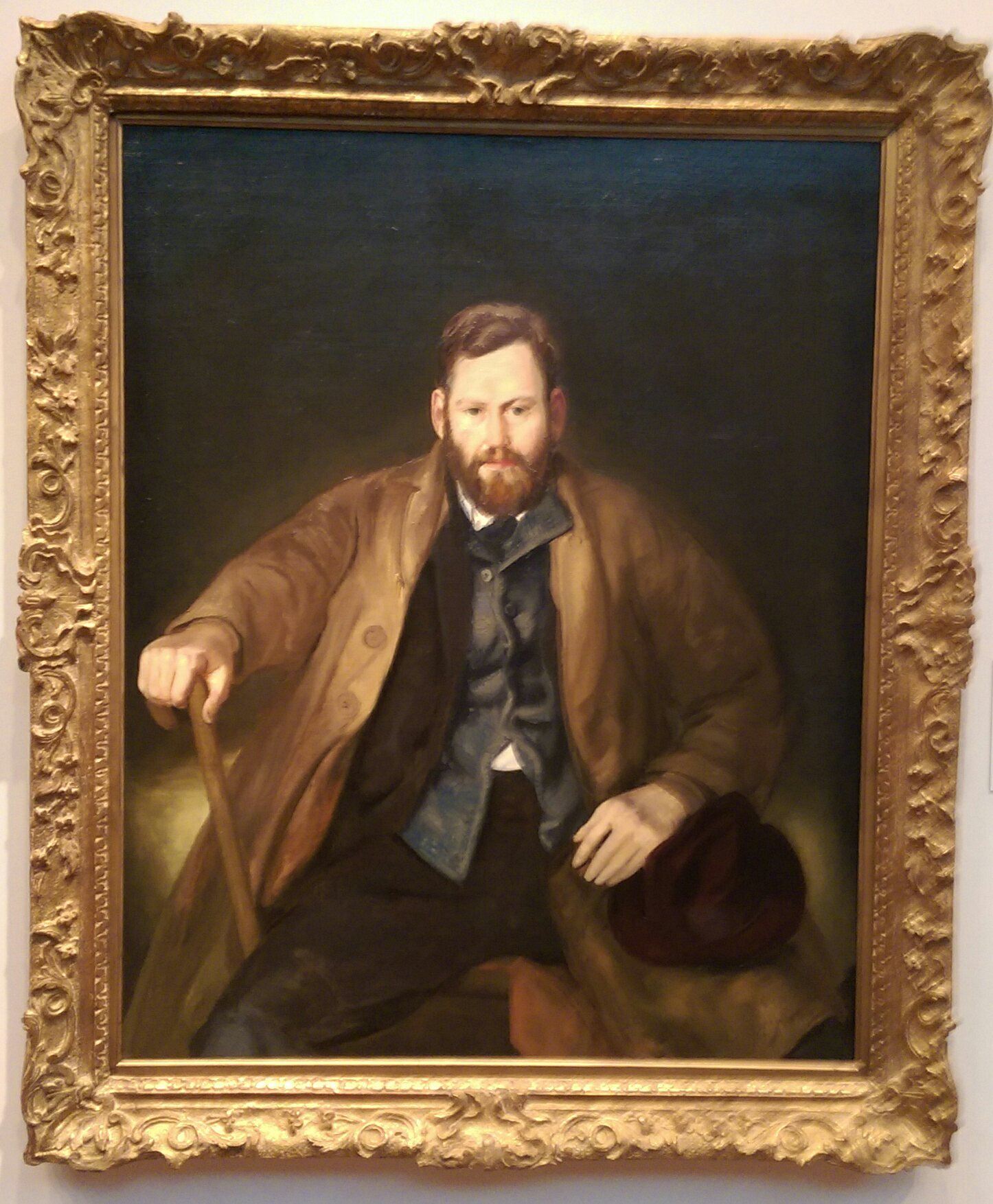
A 1920 portrait painting of Waldo Peirce by George Bellows, on display at the de Young Museum in San Francisco

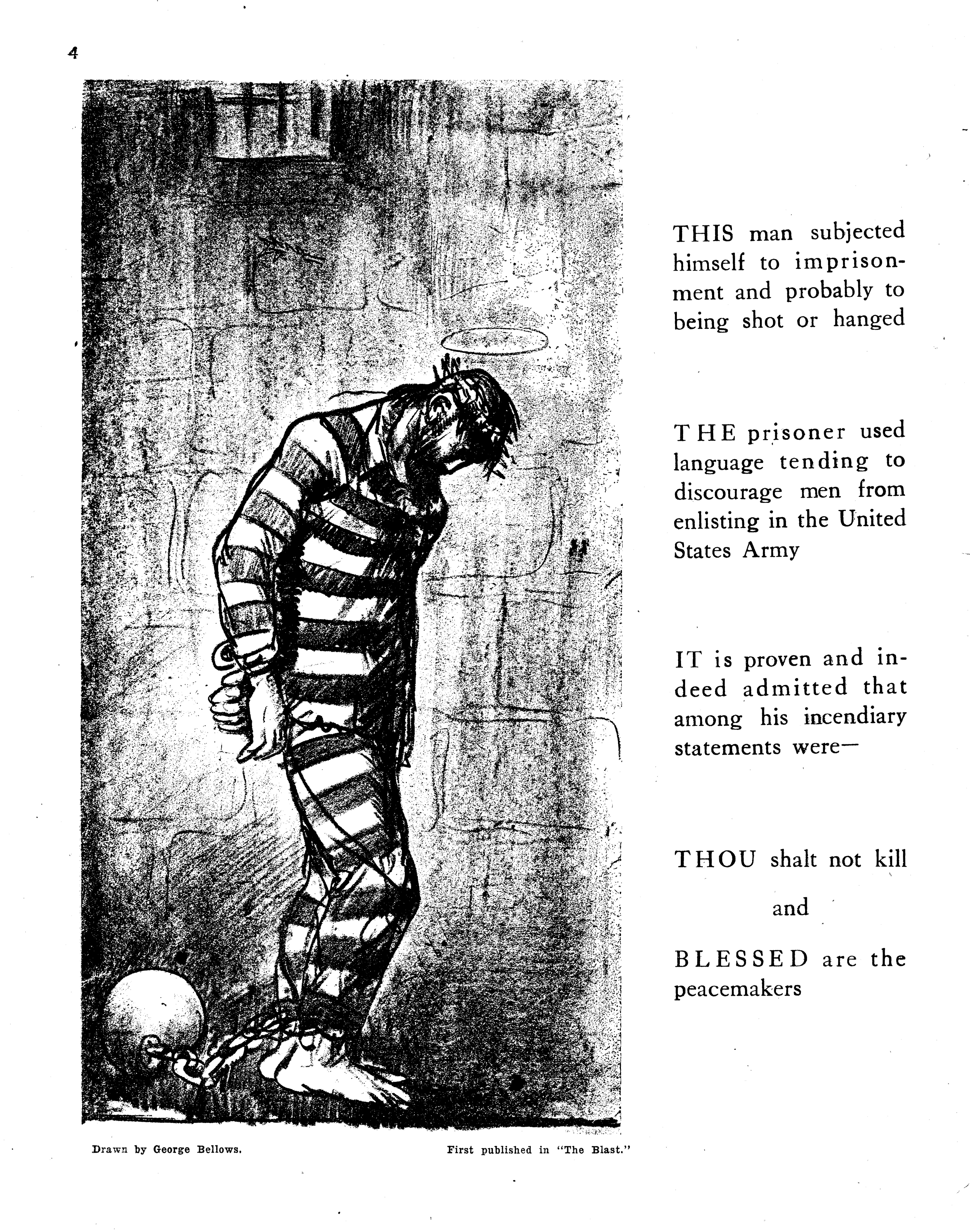
Blessed are the Peacemakers (1917), The Masses

Growing prestige as a painter brought changes in his life and work. Though he continued his earlier themes, Bellows also began to receive portrait commissions, as well as social invitations, from New York's wealthy elite. Additionally, he followed Henri's lead and began to summer in Maine, painting seascapes on Monhegan and Matinicus islands.

At the same time, the always socially conscious Bellows also associated with a group of radical artists and activists called "the Lyrical Left", who tended towards anarchism in their extreme advocacy of individual rights. He taught at the first Modern School in New York City (as did his mentor, Henri), and served on the editorial board of the socialist journal The Masses, to which he contributed many drawings and prints beginning in 1911. However, he was often at odds with other contributors due to his belief that artistic freedom should trump any ideological editorial policy. Bellows also dissented from this circle in his very public support of U.S. intervention in World War I. In 1918, he created a series of lithographs and paintings that graphically depicted atrocities which the Allies said had been committed by Germany during its invasion of Belgium. Notable among these was The Germans Arrive, which gruesomely illustrated a German soldier restraining a Belgian teen whose hands had just been severed. However, his work was also highly critical of the domestic censorship and persecution of antiwar dissenters conducted by the U.S. government under the Espionage Act.

He was criticized for some of the liberties he took in capturing scenes of war. The artist Joseph Pennell argued that because Bellows had not witnessed the events he painted firsthand, he had no right to paint them. Bellows responded that he had not been aware that Leonardo da Vinci "had a ticket to paint the Last Supper".

== Later life ==
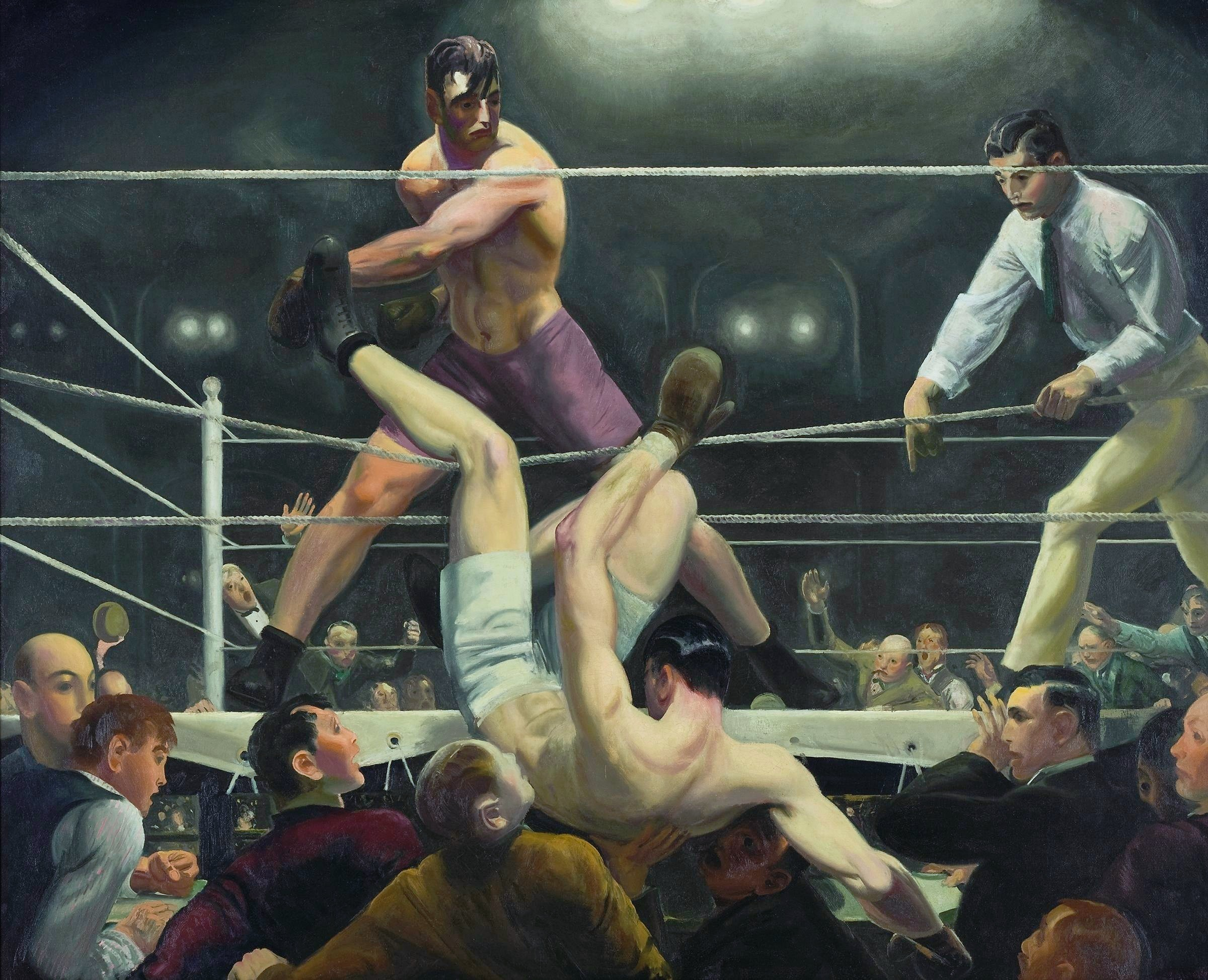
Dempsey and Firpo (1924), Whitney Museum of American Art

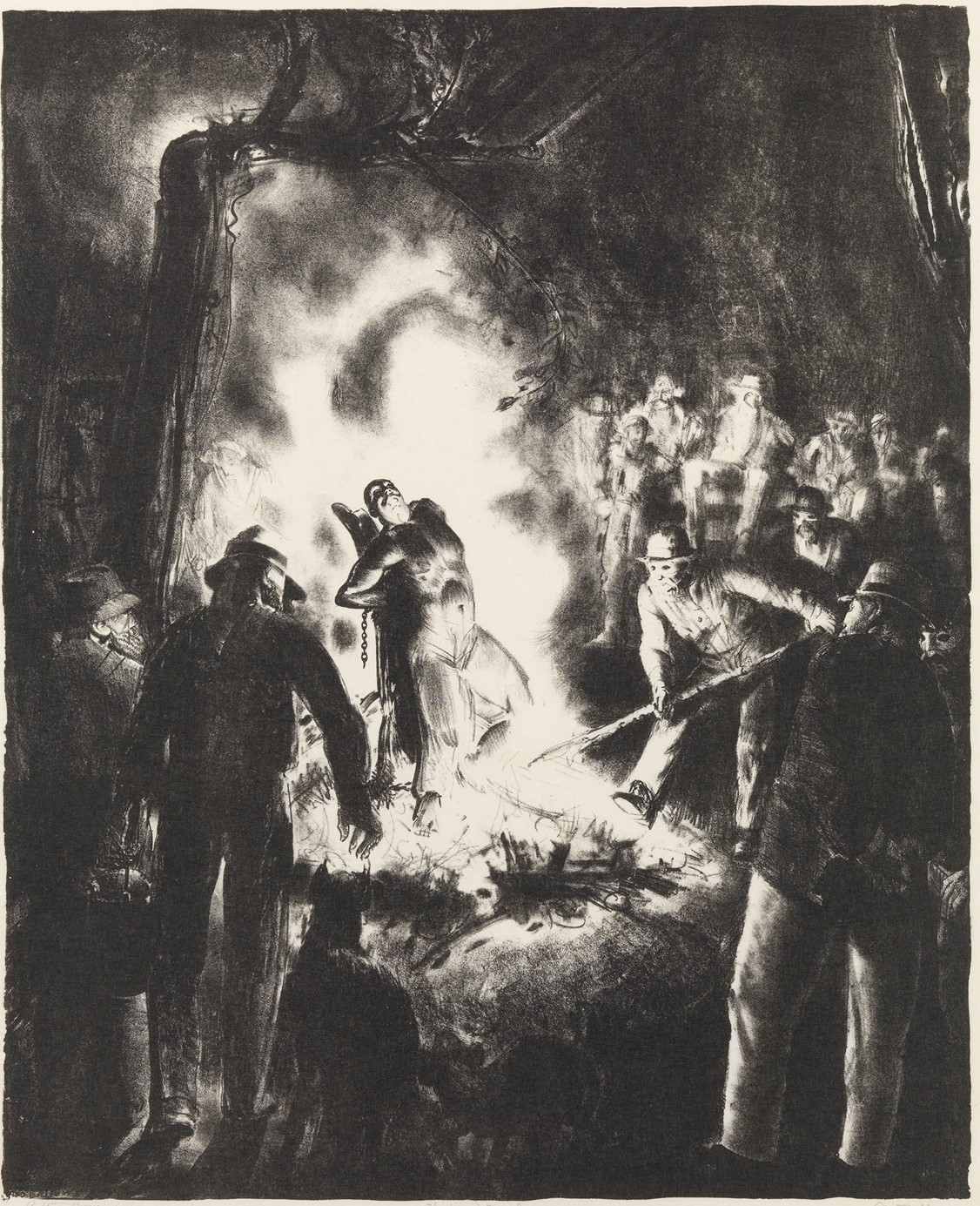
The Law Is Too Slow, used in anti-lynching publications by the National Association for the Advancement of Colored People

As Bellows's later oils focused more on domestic life, with his wife and daughters as beloved subjects, the paintings also displayed an increasingly programmatic and theoretical approach to color and design, a marked departure from the fluid muscularity of the early work.

One of Bellows's central subjects was the sea, and he painted over 250 scenes of it during the course of his career. The Fisherman (1917), a significant late canvas focusing on the topic that he made while visiting Carmel, California, is in the collection of the Amon Carter Museum of American Art.

In addition to painting, Bellows made significant contributions to lithography, helping to expand the use of the medium as a fine art in the U.S. He installed a lithography press in his studio in 1916, and between 1921 and 1924 he collaborated with master printer Bolton Brown on more than a hundred images. The Amon Carter Museum of American Art holds one of the largest collections of Bellows's lithographs, a set of 220 prints acquired from the artist's estate in 1985. There are also large collections of his lithographs at the Boston Public Library and the Cleveland Museum of Art.

Bellows also illustrated numerous books in his later career, including several by H.G. Wells.

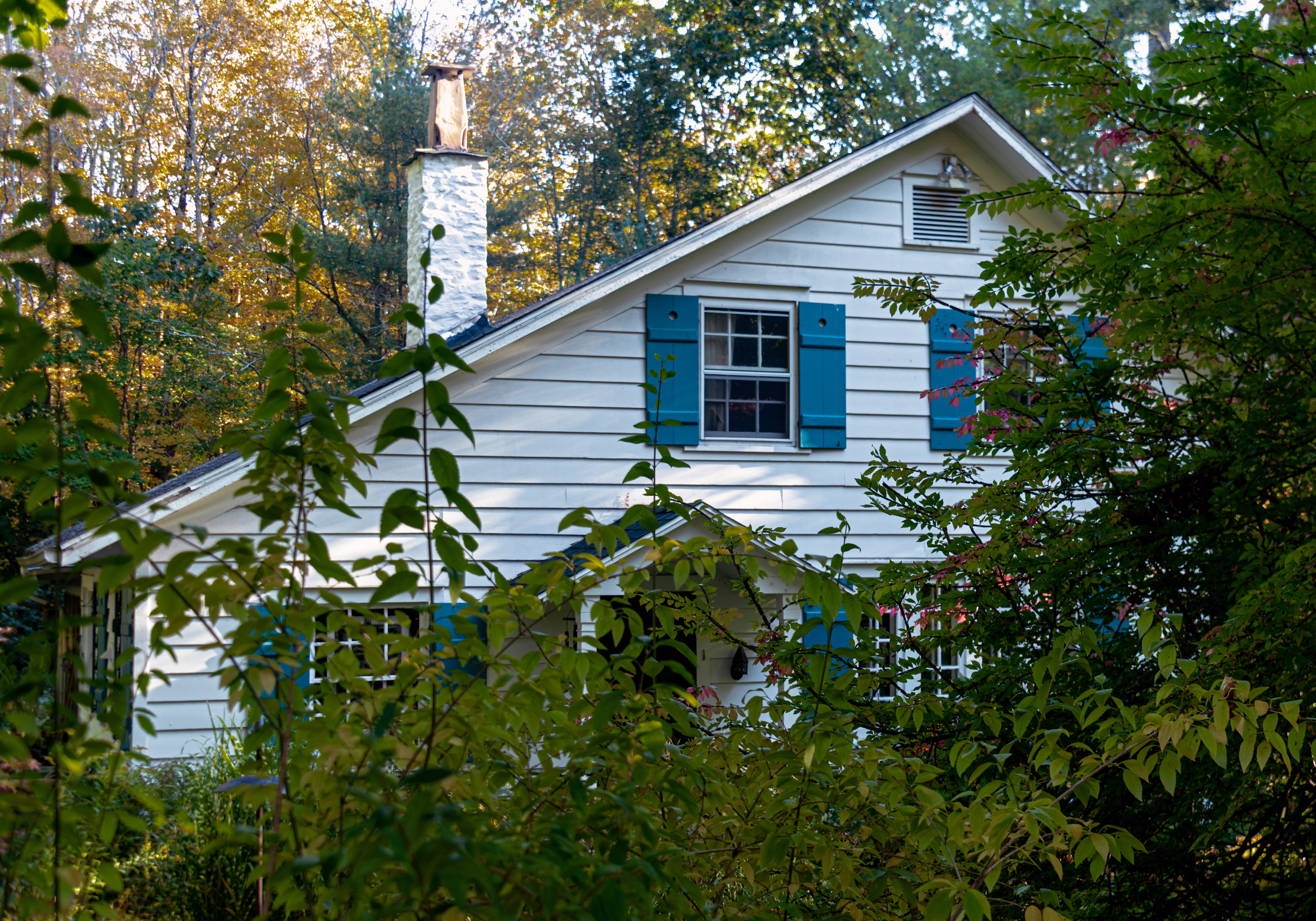
Bellows's summer residence in Woodstock, New York, now listed on the National Register of Historic Places

Bellows taught at the Art Institute of Chicago in 1919. In 1920, he began to spend nearly half of each year in Woodstock, New York, where he built a home for his family. He died on January 8, 1925, at 42 years of age, in New York City, of peritonitis, after failing to tend to a ruptured appendix. He was survived by his wife, Emma Story Bellows (married 1910), and daughters Anne and Jean. Bellows is buried at Green-Wood Cemetery in Brooklyn. "Of American artists of the first rank," wrote Joyce Carol Oates, "none had a more tragically foreshortened career than Bellows.... [He was] the most famous American artist of his time."

Paintings and prints by George Bellows are in the collections of many major and regional American art museums, including the Art Museum of Southeast Texas in Beaumont, Texas, the National Gallery of Art in Washington, D.C., the Memorial Art Gallery of the University of Rochester, and the Whitney and the Museum of Modern Art in New York, and The Hyde Collection, in Glens Falls, New York. The Columbus Museum of Art in Bellows's hometown also has a sizeable collection of both his portraits and New York street scenes. The White House acquired his 1919 painting Three Children in 2007, and it is now displayed in the Green Room.

The Whitney Museum published a biography of Bellows by fellow artist George William Eggers as part of the American Artists Series. In 1992 it mounted an extensive exhibition of his art (the exhibition was a joint venture with the Los Angeles County Museum of Art).

The Archives and Special Collections at Amherst College holds his papers.

== Posthumous sales and exhibitions ==
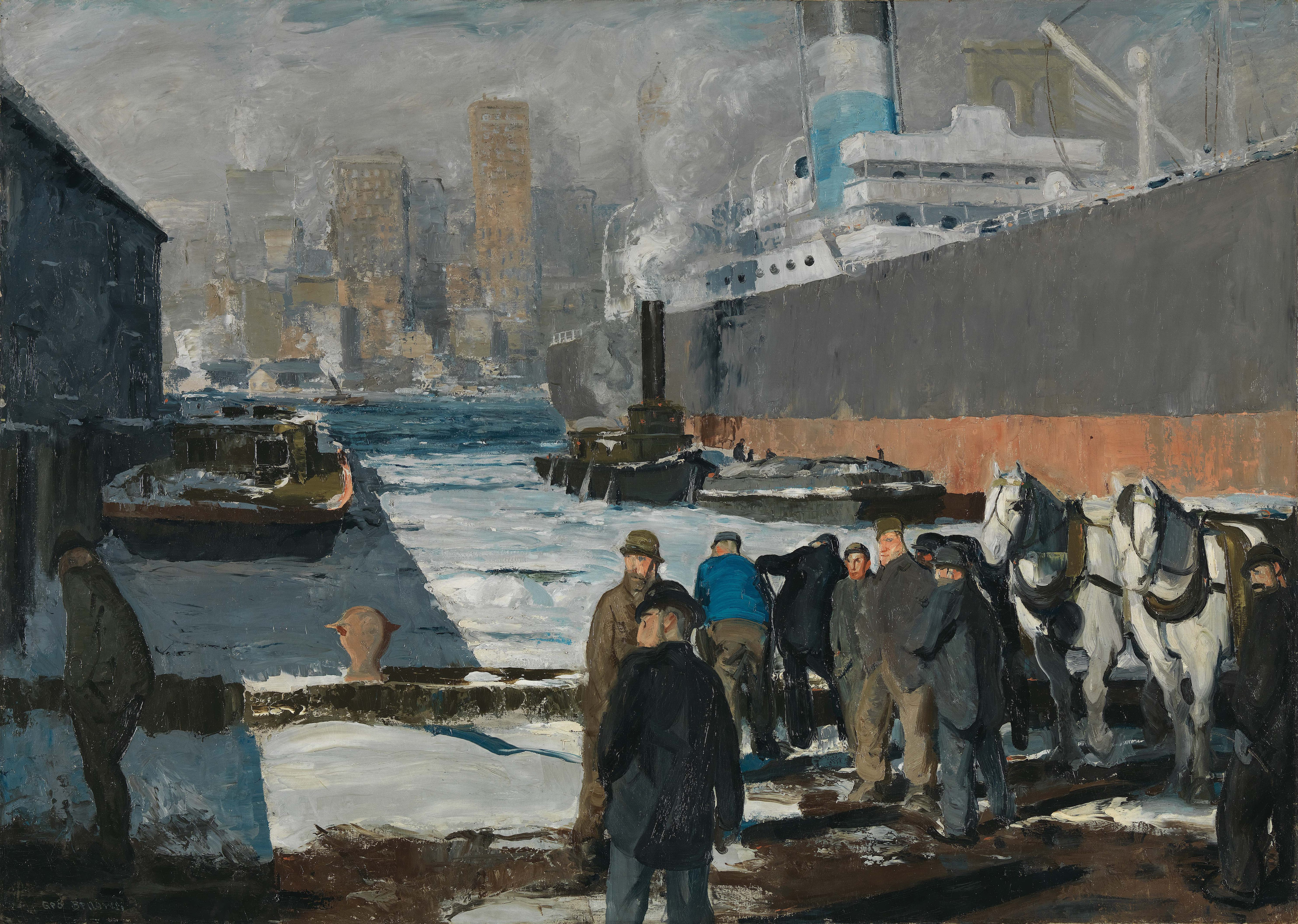
Men of the Docks, 1912

External videos
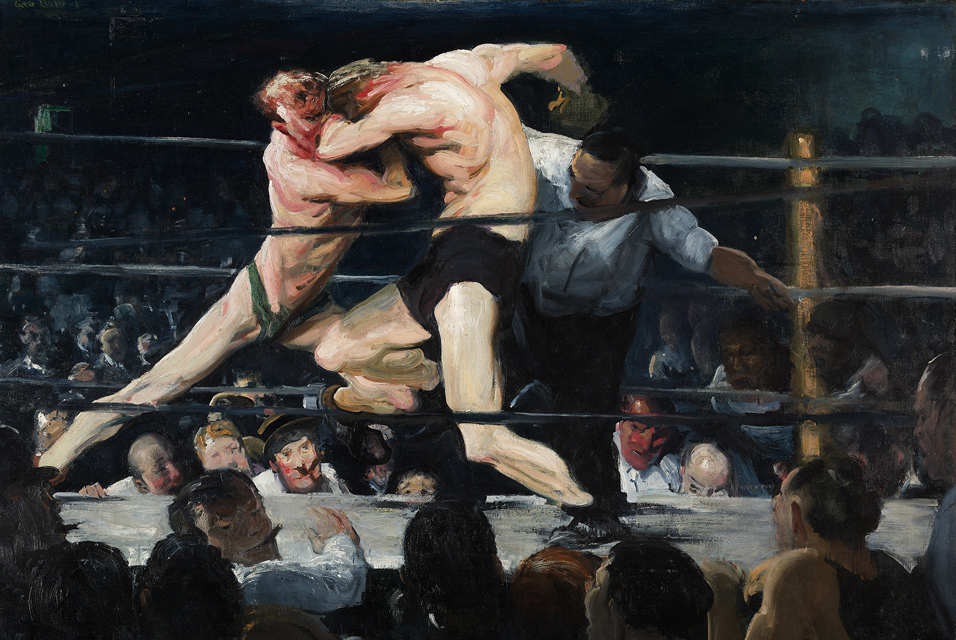
- The Art of Boxing -- "George Bellows" at the National Gallery of Art on YouTube, National Gallery of Art (Washington)
- Bellows's Pennsylvania Station Excavation, Smarthistory

His work was part of the painting event in the art competition at the 1932 Summer Olympics.

In 1957, the National Gallery of Art exhibited A Retrospective Exhibition of the Work of George Bellows. The show included Bellow’s paintings, drawings and lithographs.

In December 1999, Polo Crowd, a 1910 painting, sold for U.S.$27.5 million to billionaire Bill Gates. In November 2008, Bellows's Men of the Docks, a 1912 painting of the Brooklyn docks spanning the East River and depicting the Manhattan skyline in the background, was to be auctioned at Christie's in New York. It was expected to set the record for an American painting sold at auction with an estimate of $25–35 million. The painting's sale however was a source of controversy at Randolph College because it was the first masterpiece purchased for the Maier Museum of Art by students and locals who raised $2,500 to purchase it in 1920. Due to a series of lawsuits and the deflated art market, the painting remained unsold until 2014 when it became the first major American painting to be purchased by the British National Gallery in London.

In 2001, Thomas French Fine Art became the exclusive agent of the George Bellows Family Trust.

In 2012, the National Gallery of Art in association with the Metropolitan Museum of Art and the Royal Academy of Arts organized a retrospective of Bellows's work titled “George Bellows.” The exhibit included more than 130 paintings, drawings, and lithographs; loans from various collections included Dempsey and Firpo from the Whitney Museum of American Art, The White Horse from the Worcester Art Museum, and Men of the Docks from Randolph College. (Men of the Docks is now in the National Gallery collection in London.) The retrospective was exhibited at National Gallery of Art (June 10 – October 8, 2012), the Metropolitan Museum (November 15, 2012 – February 18, 2013) and the Royal Academy of Arts (March 16, 2013 – June 9, 2013). The catalog was edited by Charles Brock ISBN 978-0894683749

In November 2021, the Columbus Museum of Art opened the George Bellows Center to encourage exhibitions, publications and scholarly research on his life and work. Noted Bellows scholar Mark Cole of the Cleveland Museum of Art presented a lecture on Bellows's life with a specific focus on sports subjects in his work.

== Selected works ==
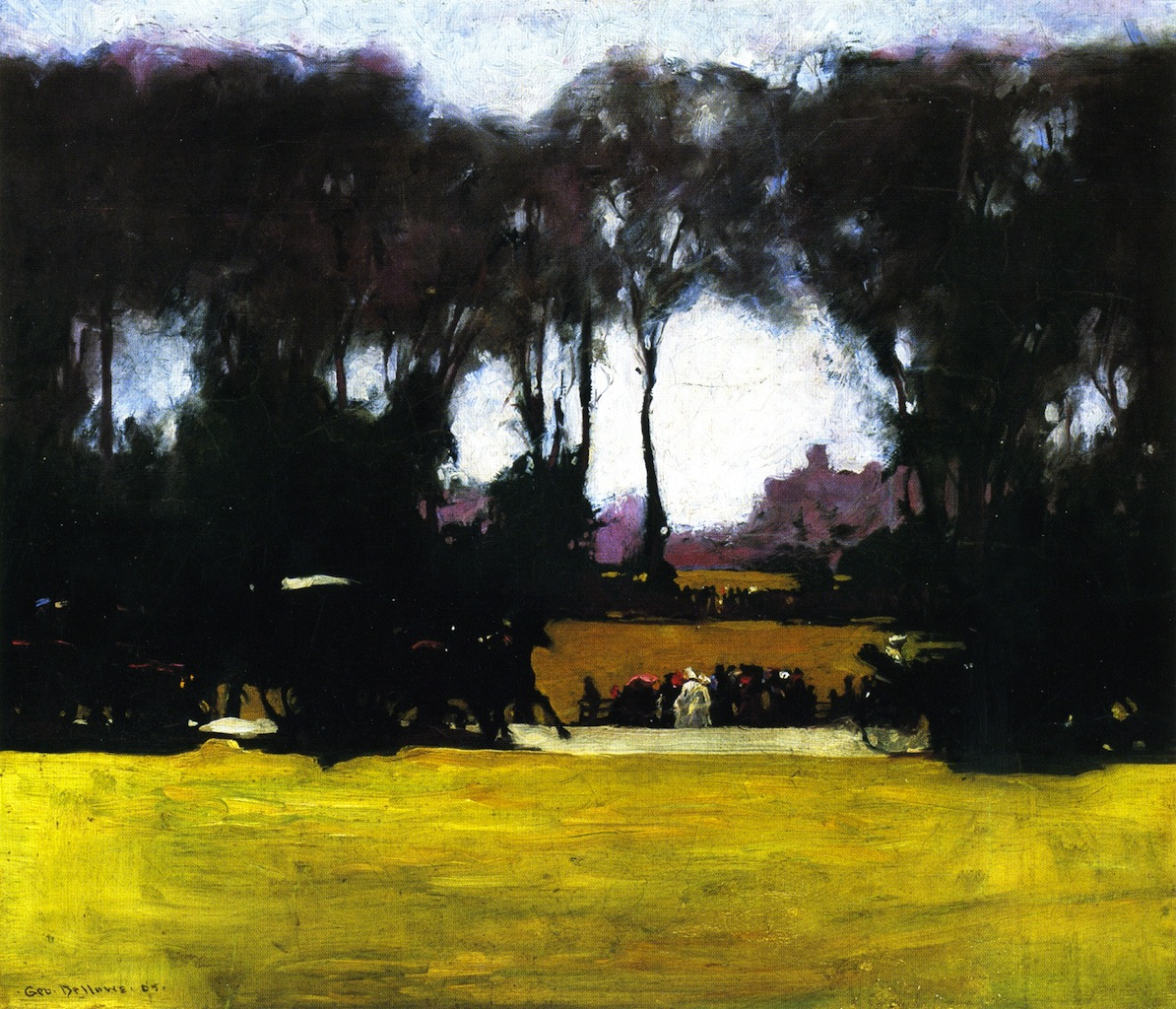
Central Park (1905)

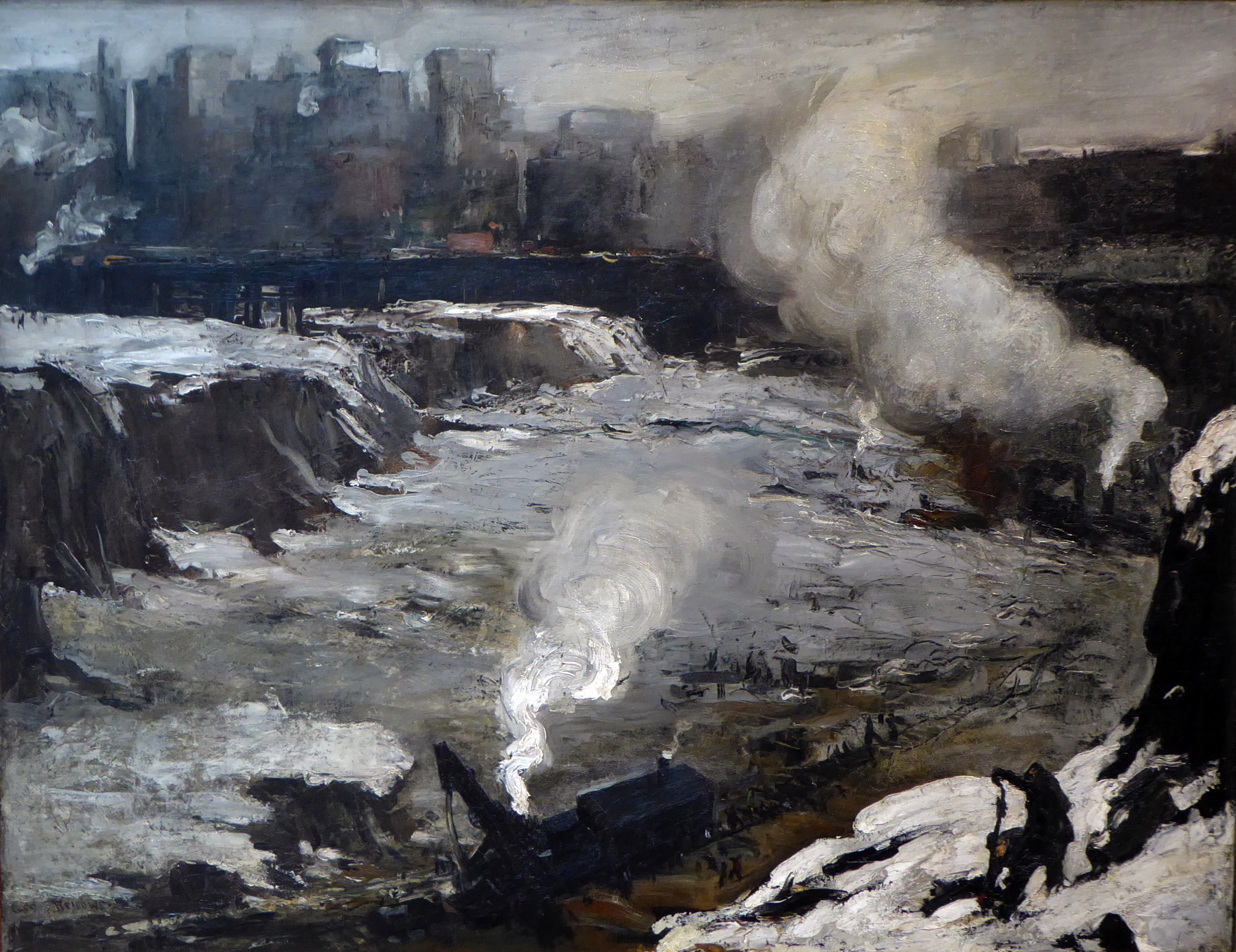
Pennsylvania Excavation (1907), Smith College Museum of Art

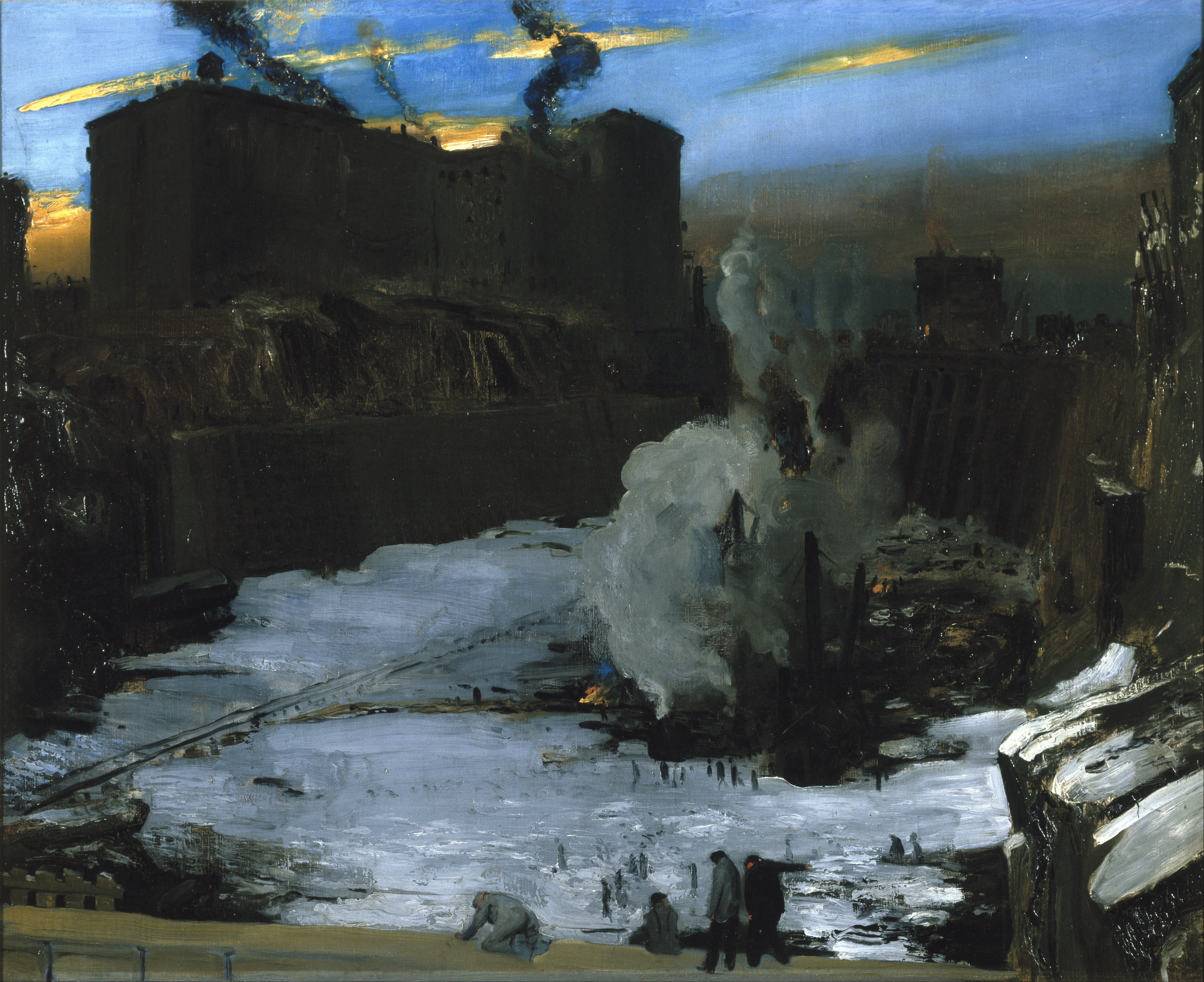
Pennsylvania Station Excavation (1907), Brooklyn Museum

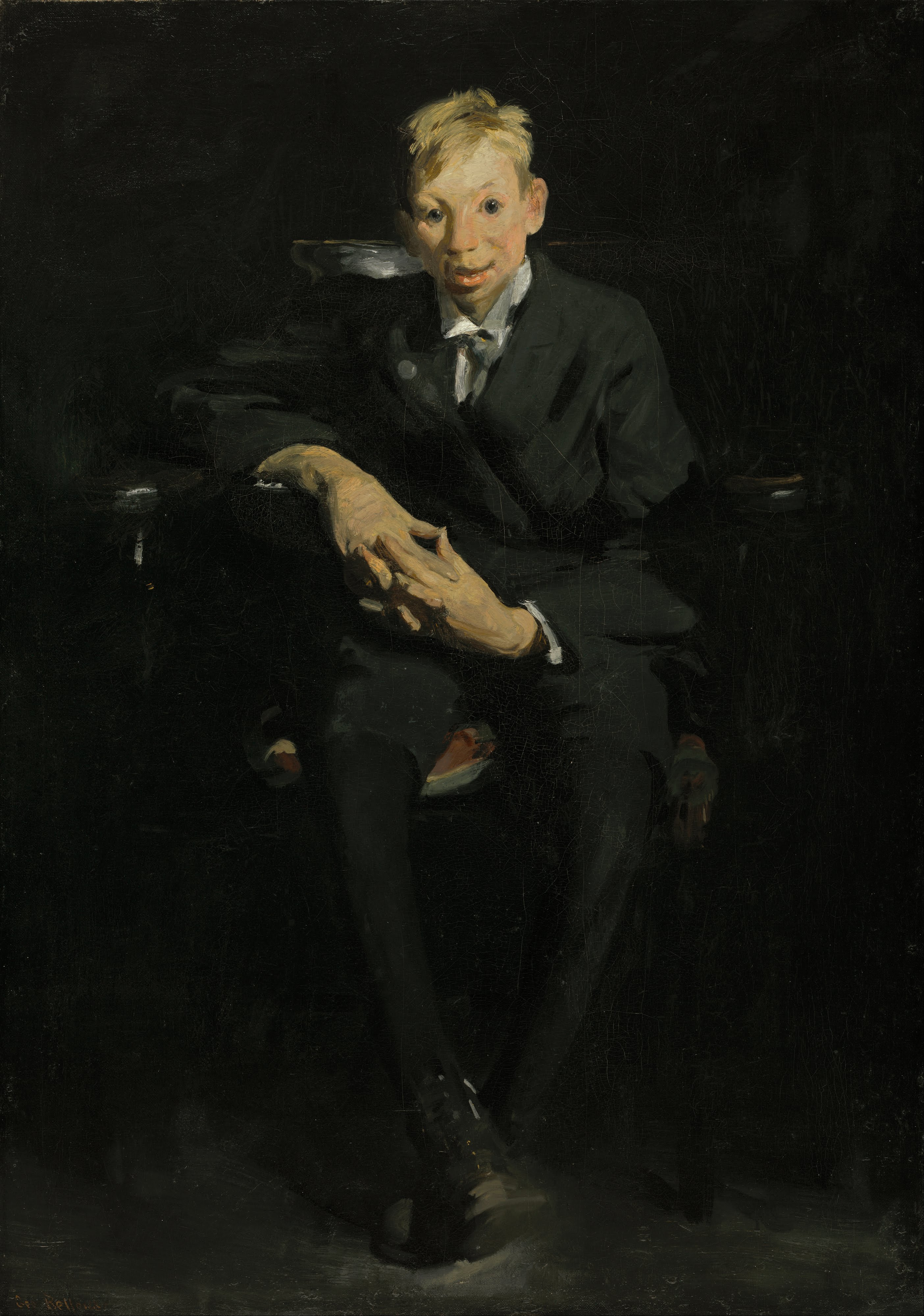
Frankie, the Organ Boy (1907), Nelson-Atkins Museum of Art

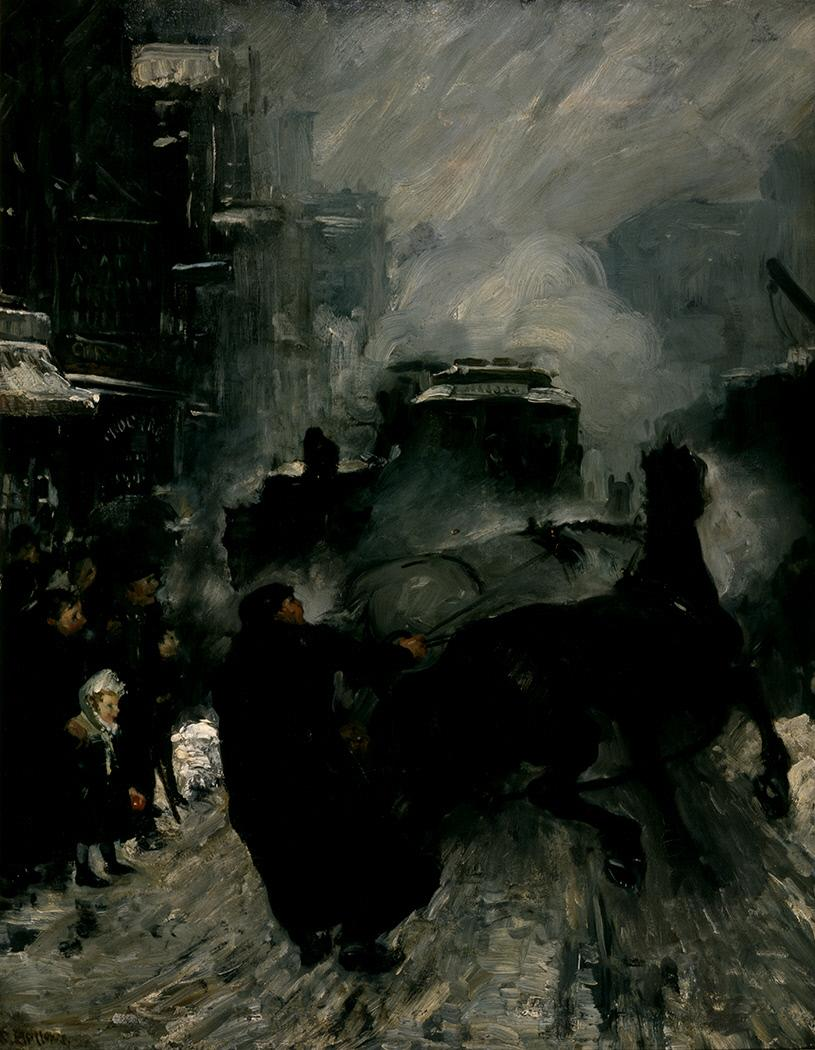
Steaming Streets (1908)

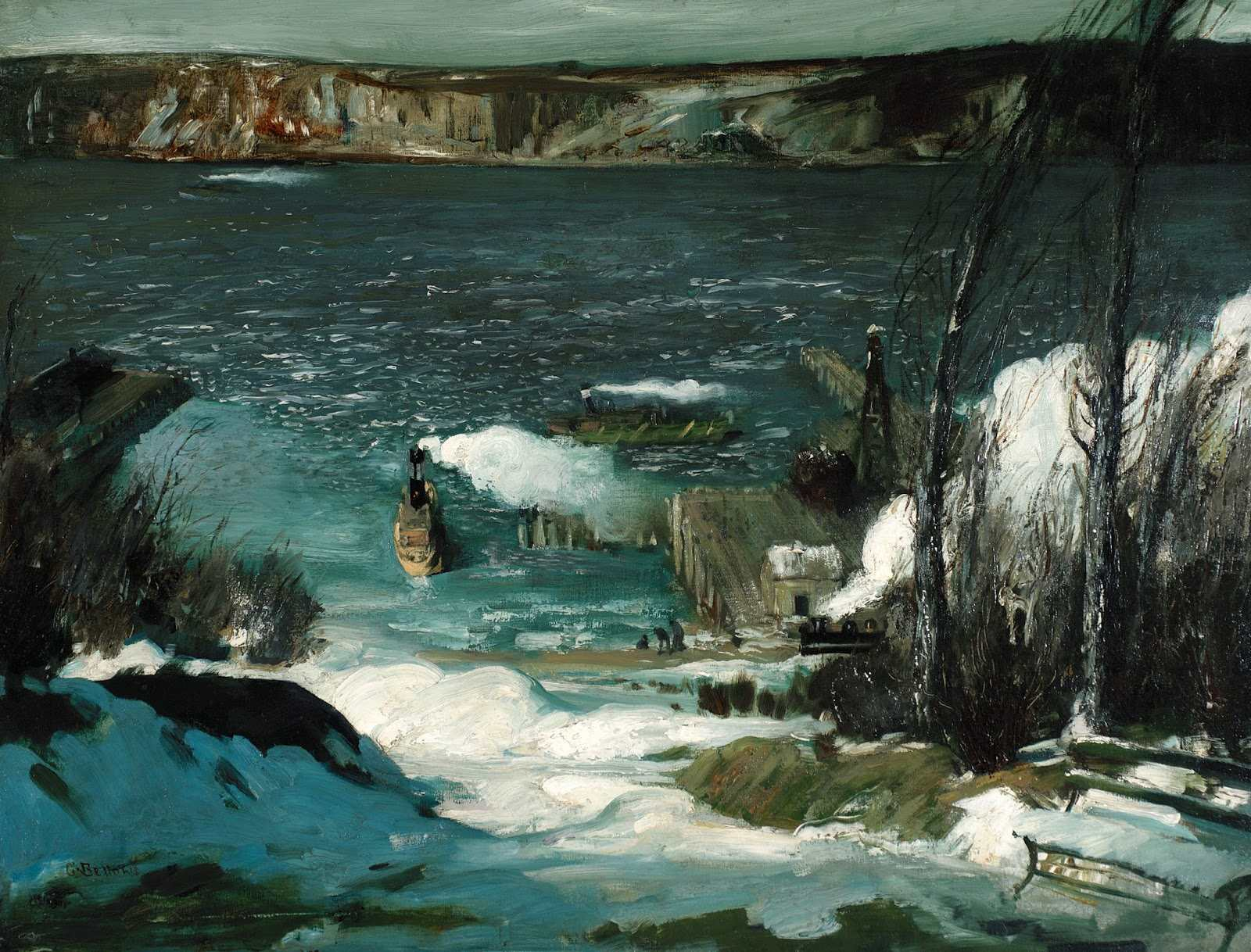
North River (1908), Pennsylvania Academy of the Fine Arts

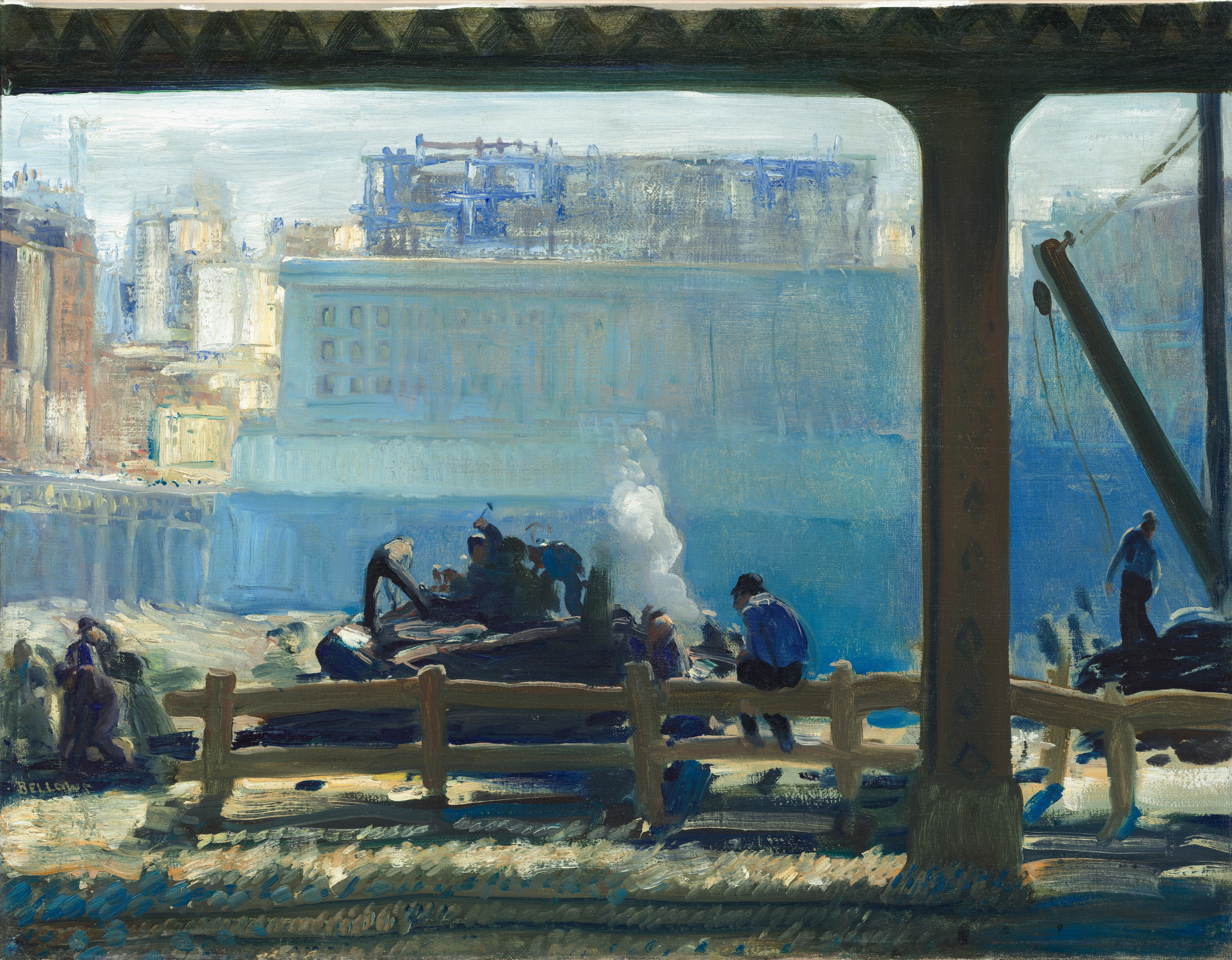
Blue Morning (1909)

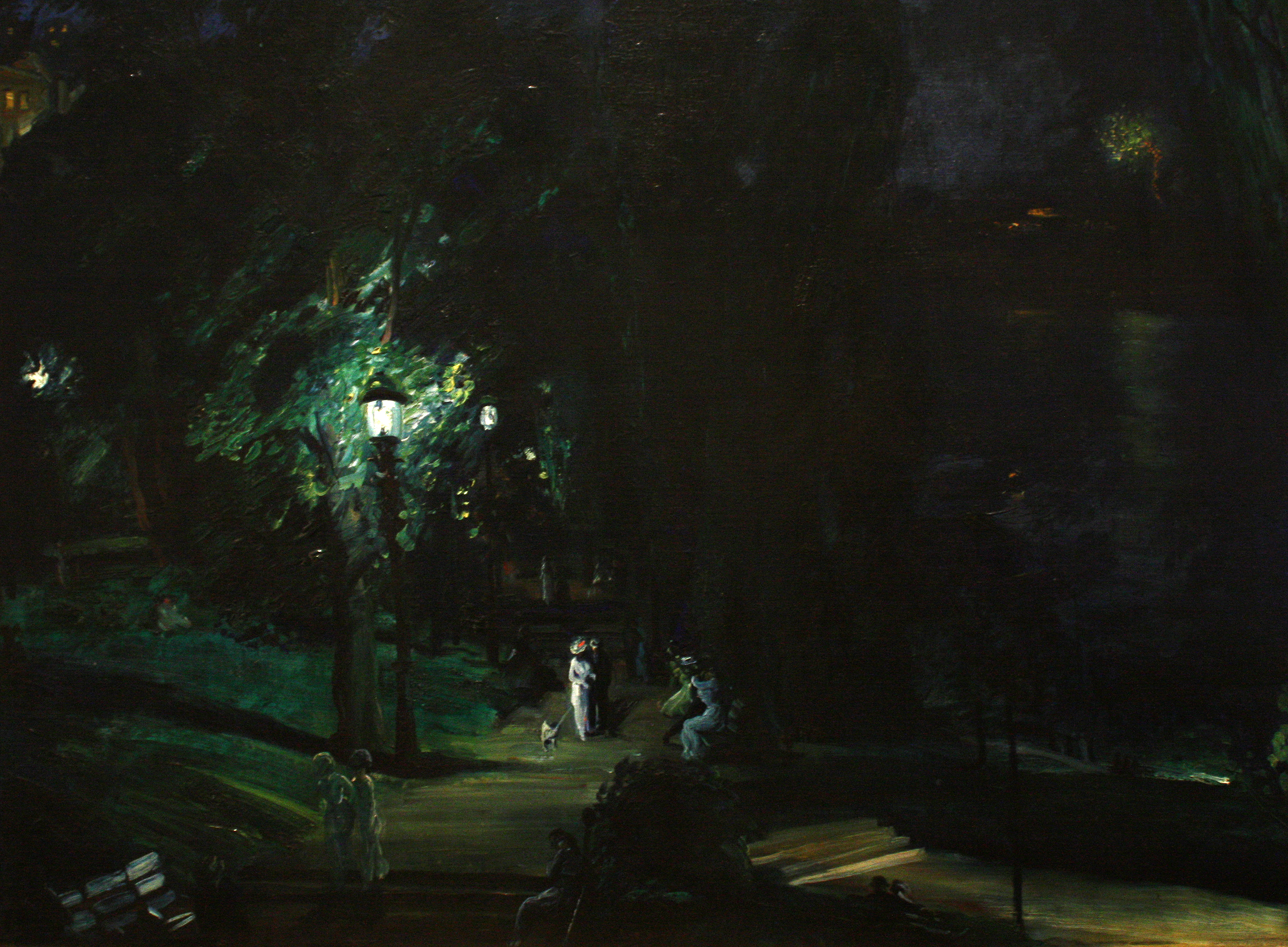
Summer Night, Riverside Drive (1909), Columbus Museum of Art

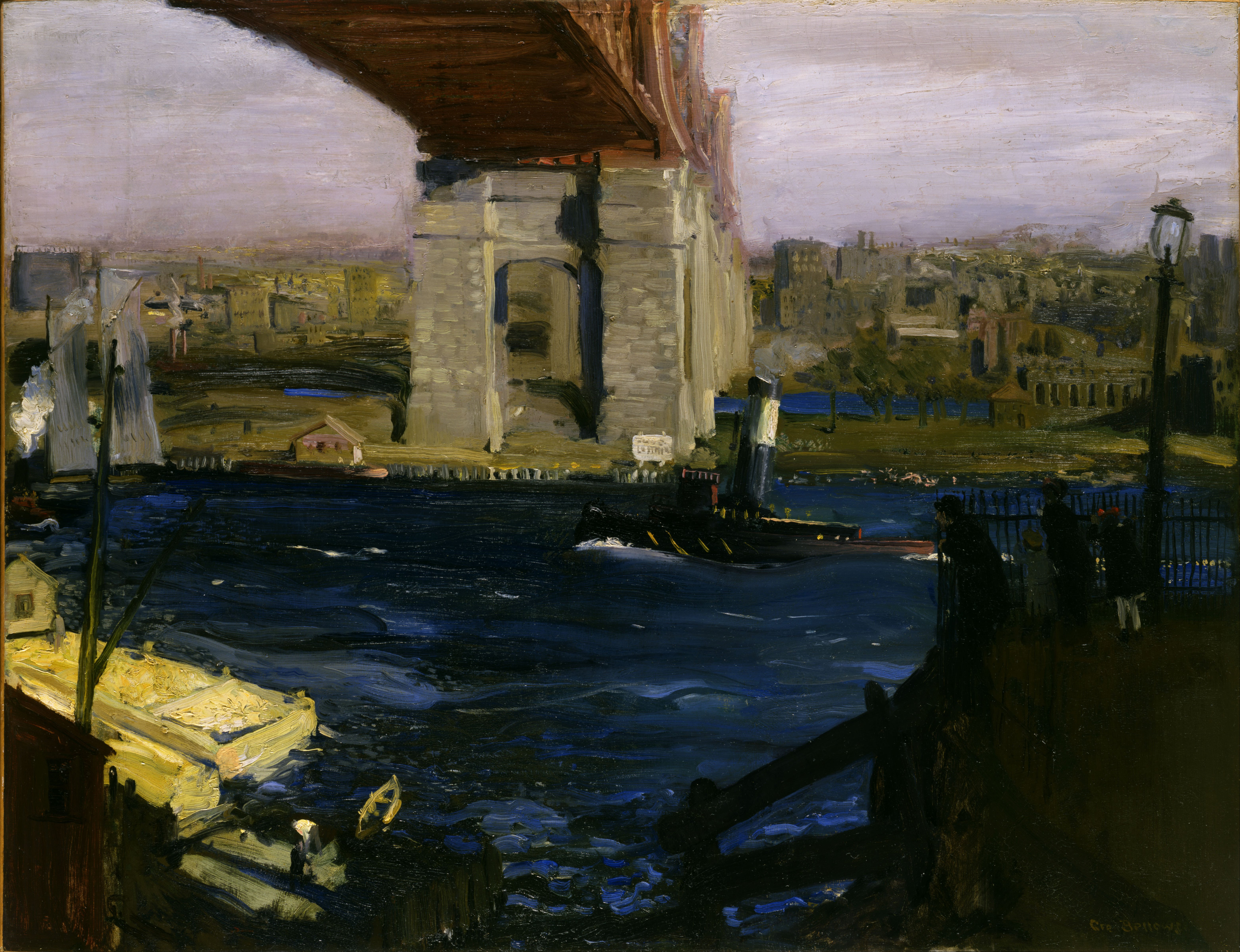
The Bridge, Blackwell's Island (1909), Toledo Museum of Art

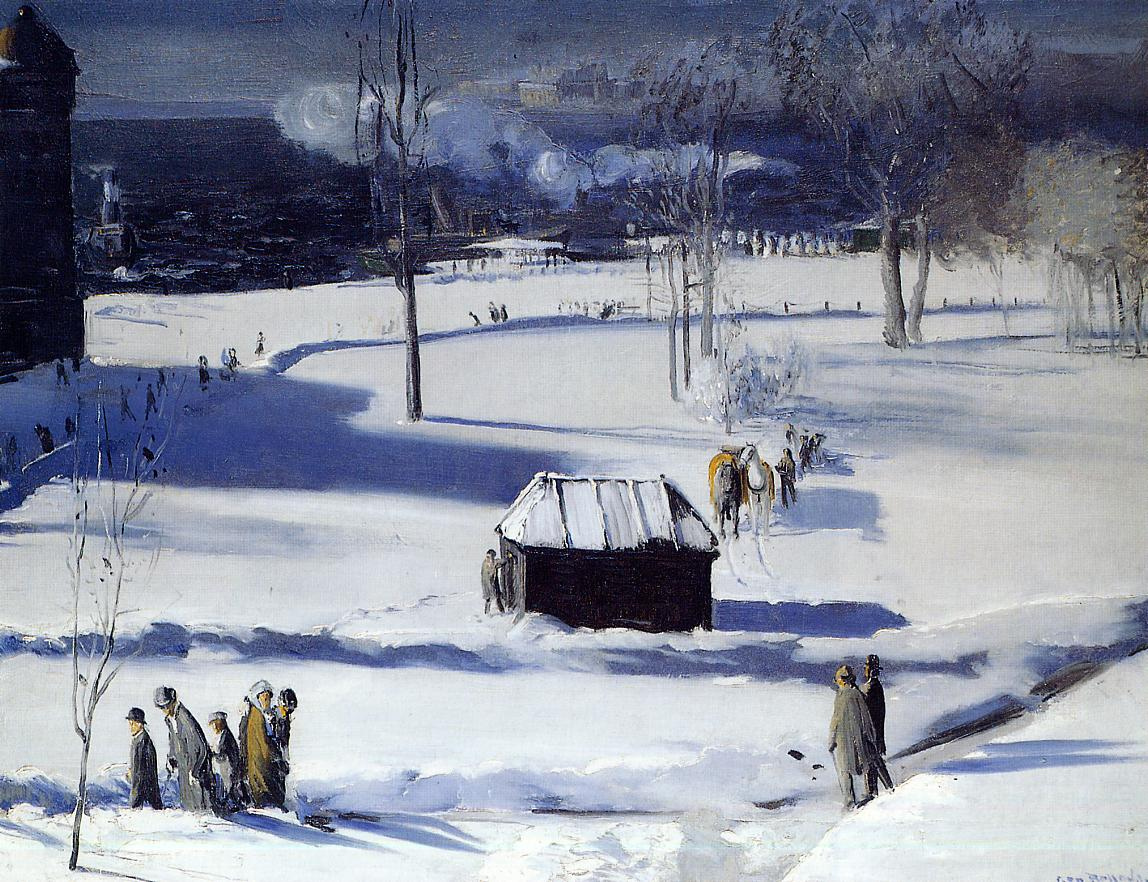
Blue Snow the Battery (1910)

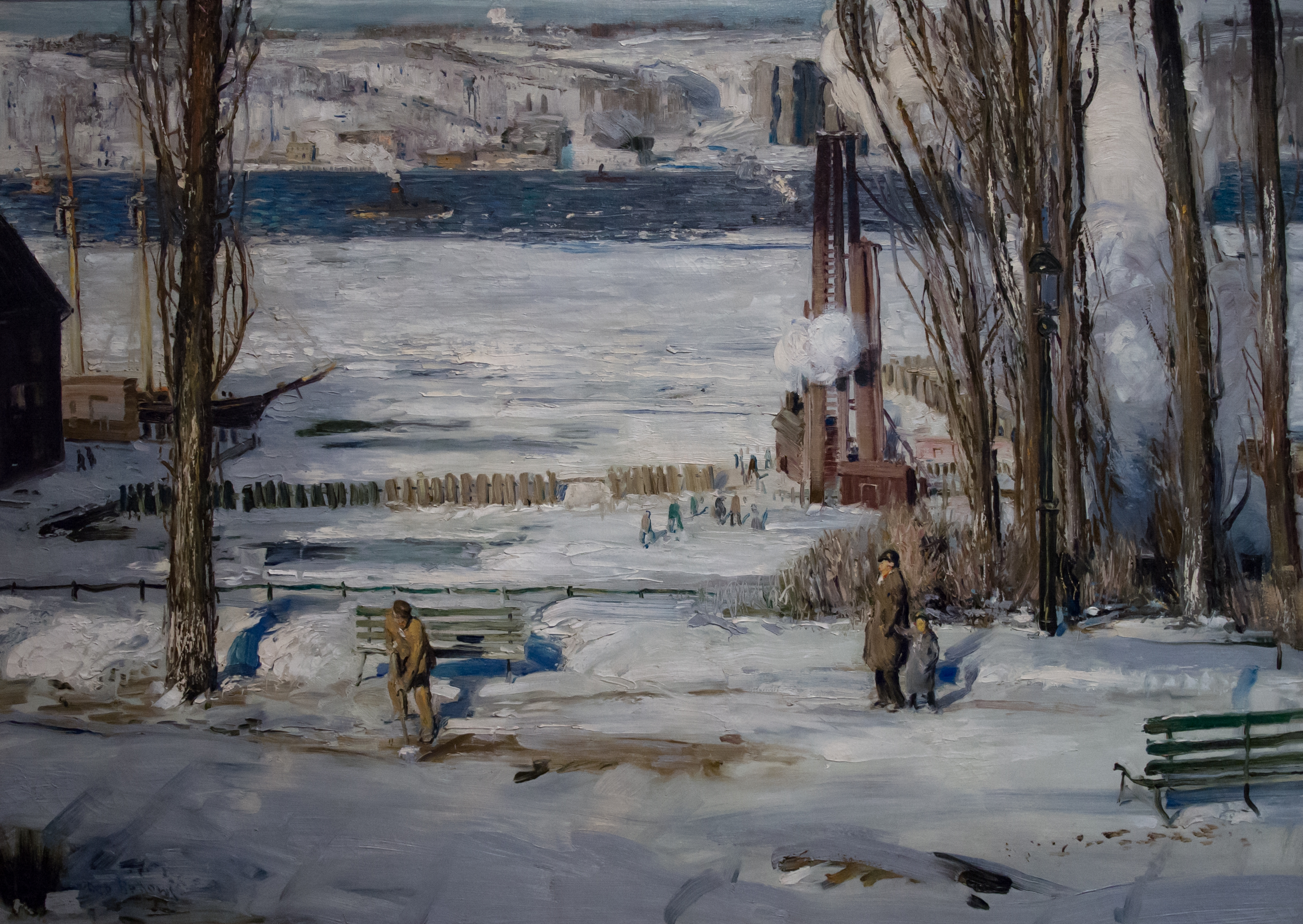
A Morning Snow Hudson River (1910)

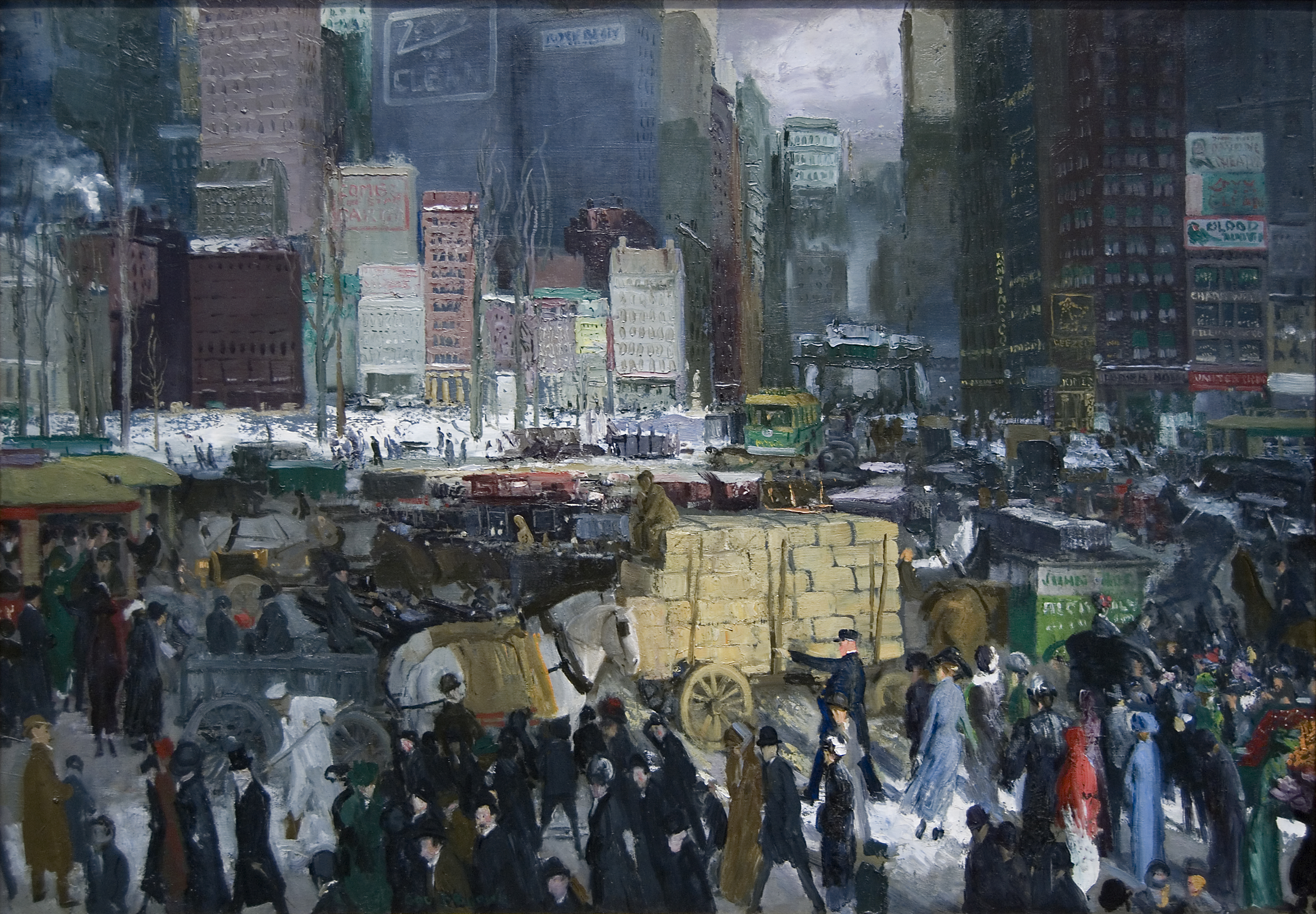
New York (1911)

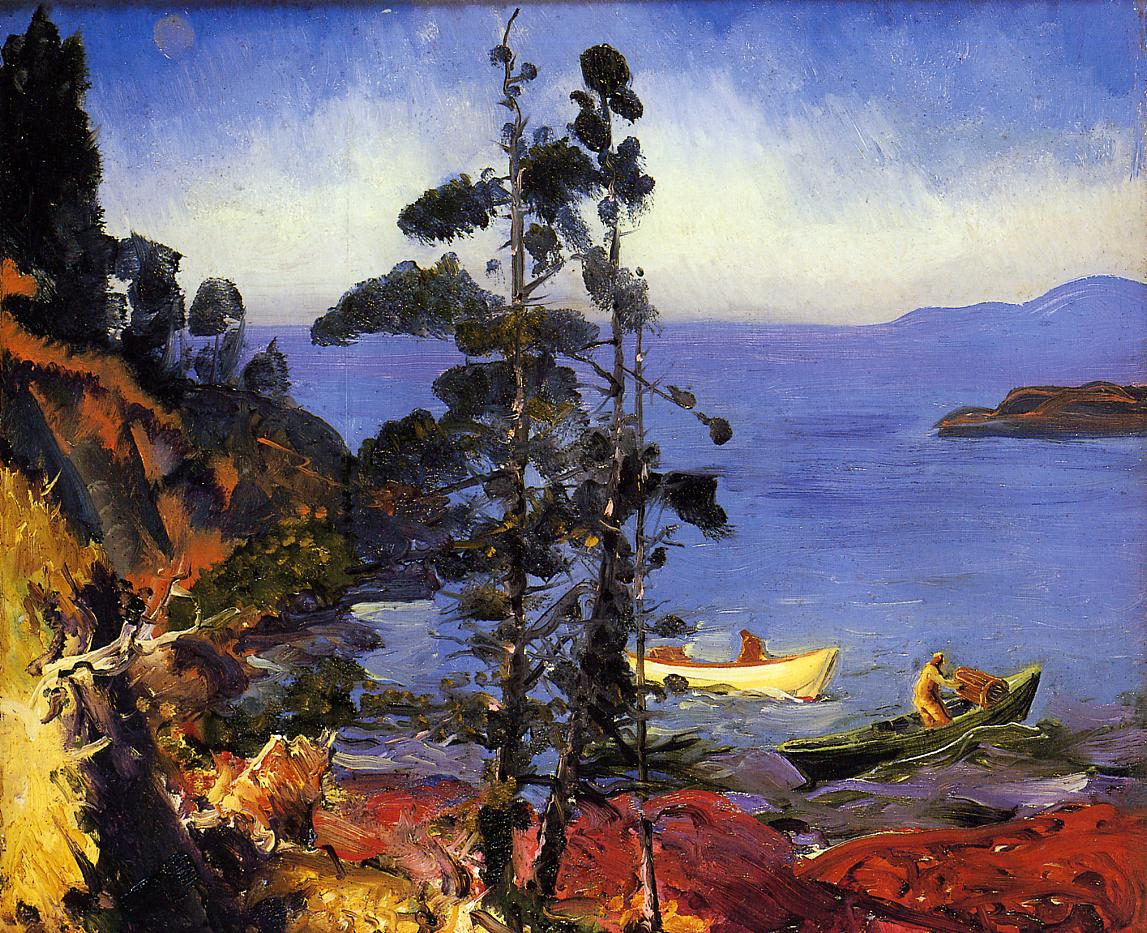
Evening Blue (1913)

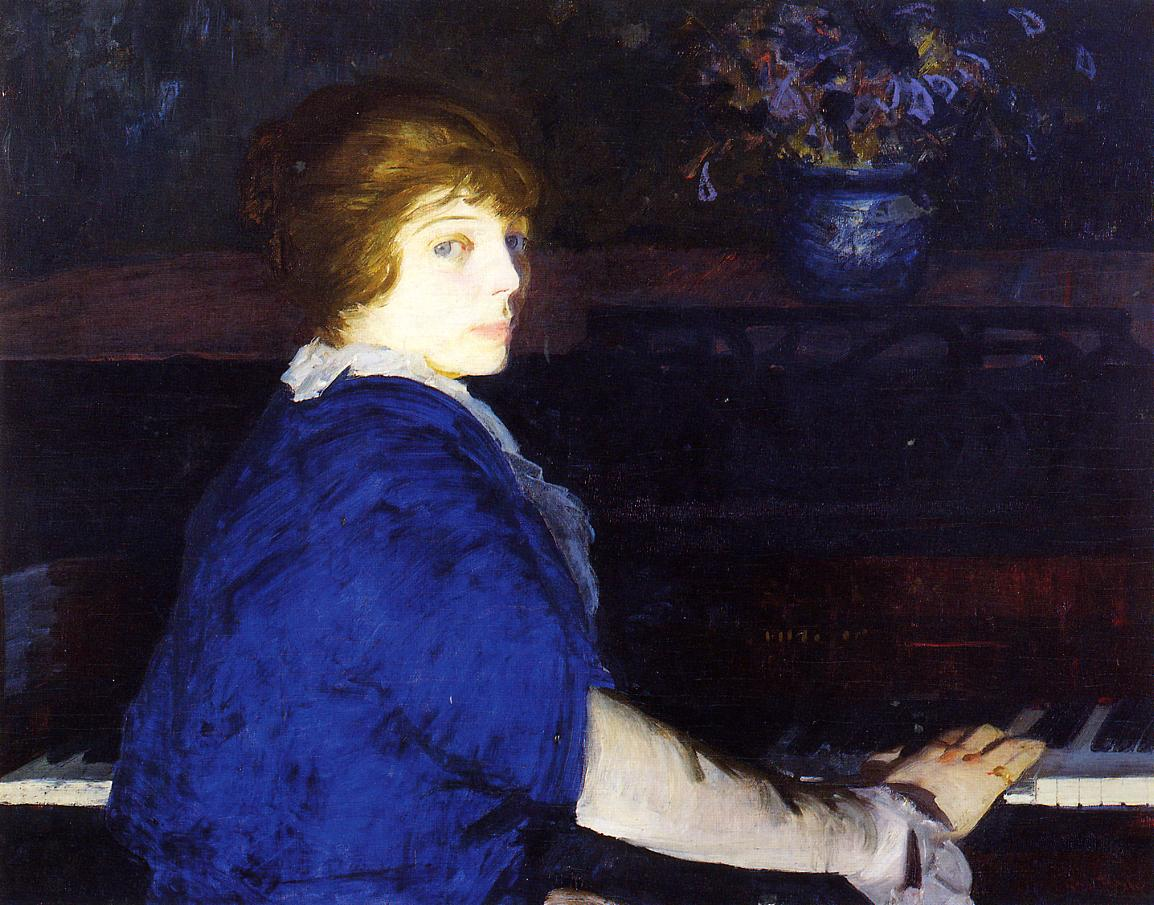
Emma at the Piano, (1914)

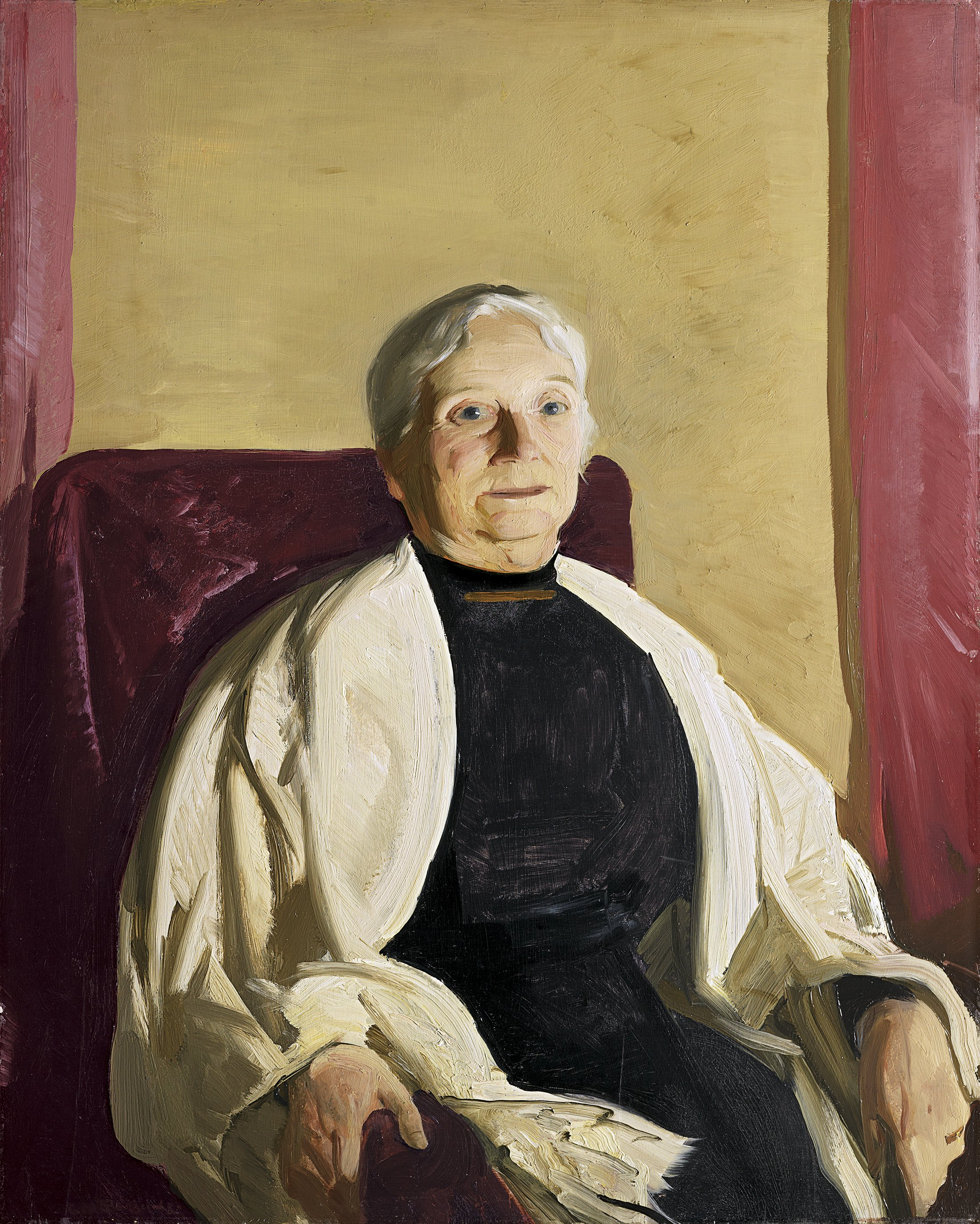
A Grandmother, 1914, Museo Thyssen-Bornemisza

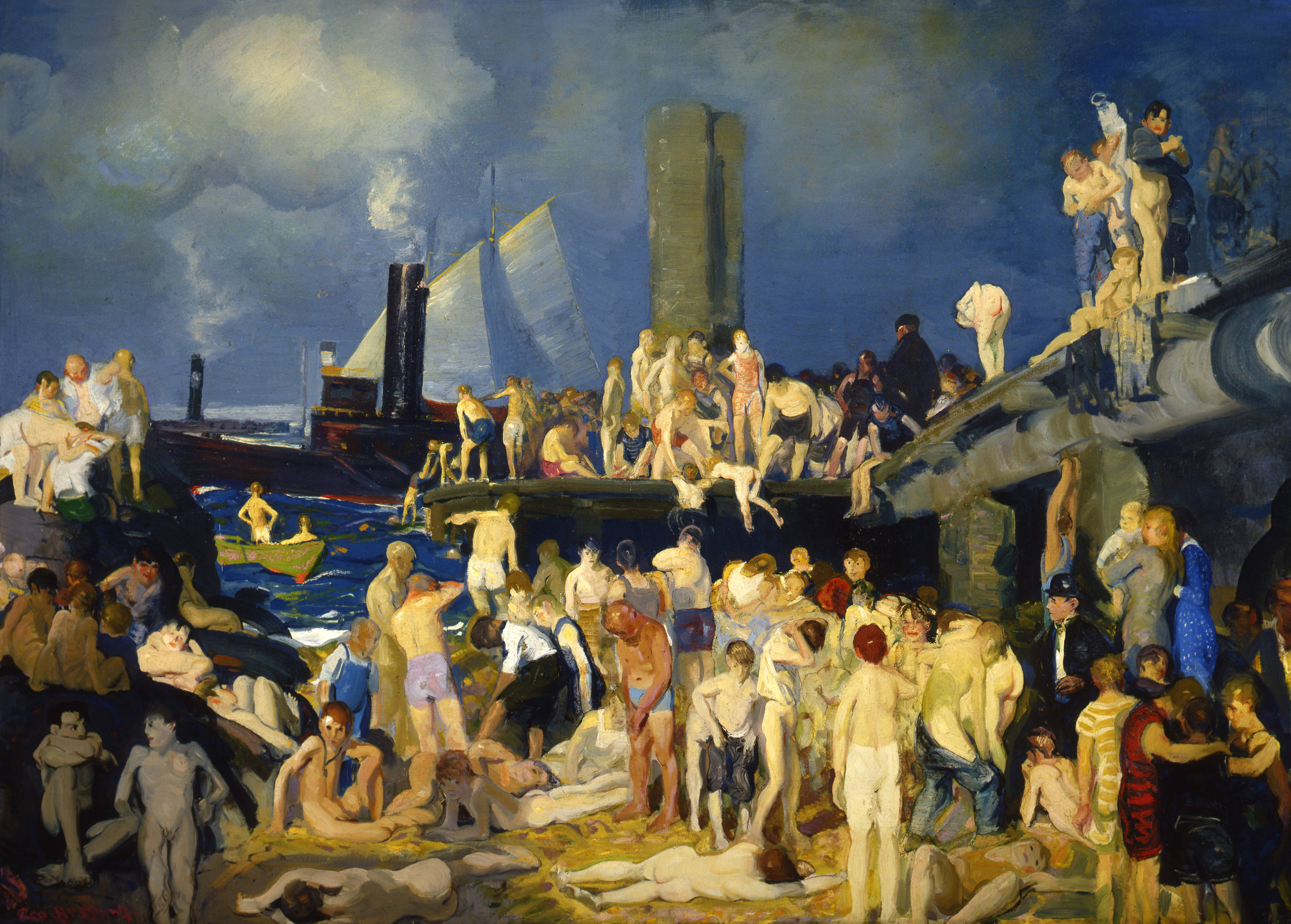
River Front 1, 1915

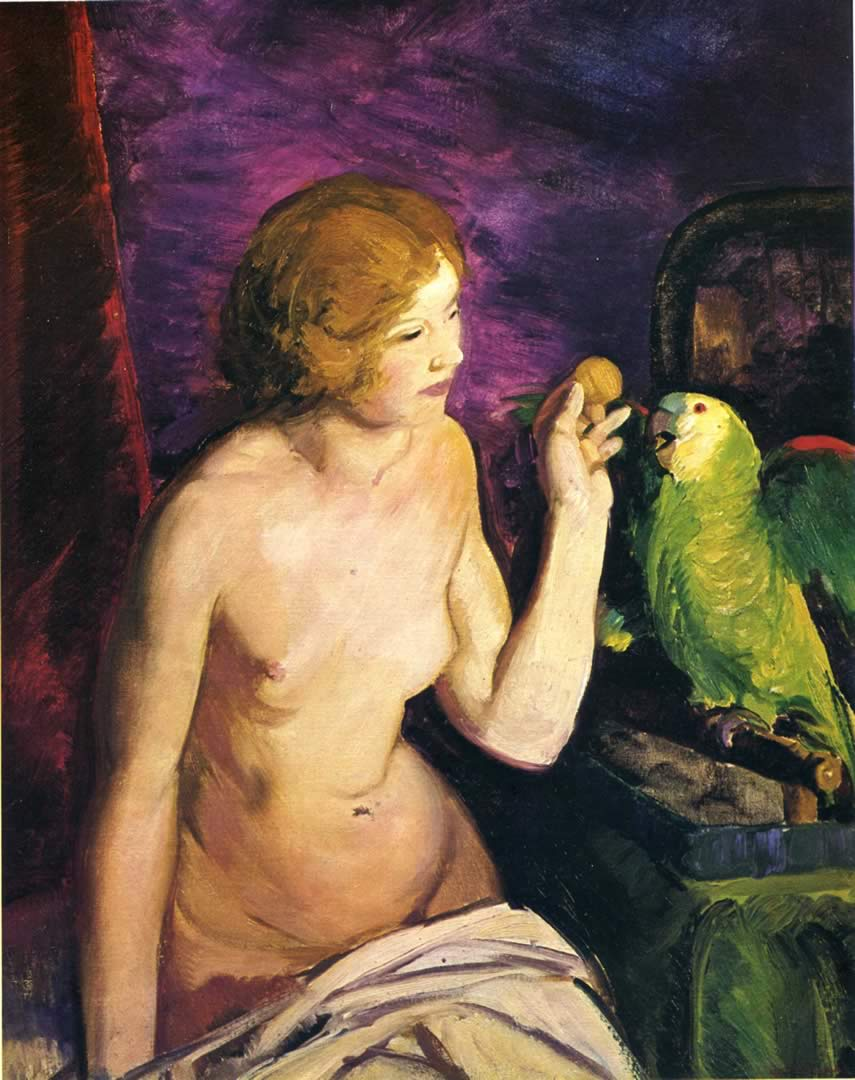
Nude with a Parrot (1915)

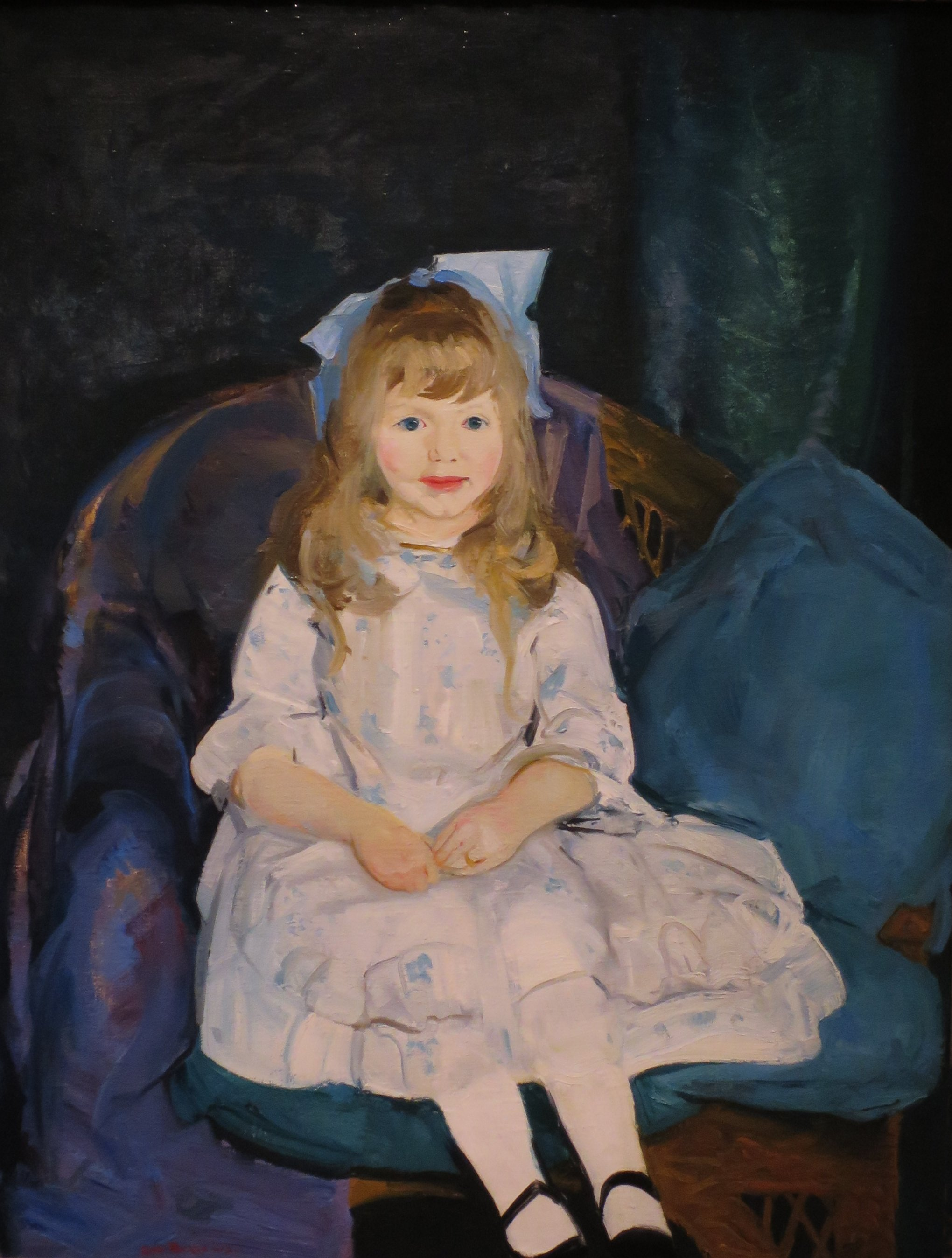
Portrait of Anne (Bellows's daughter, 1915)

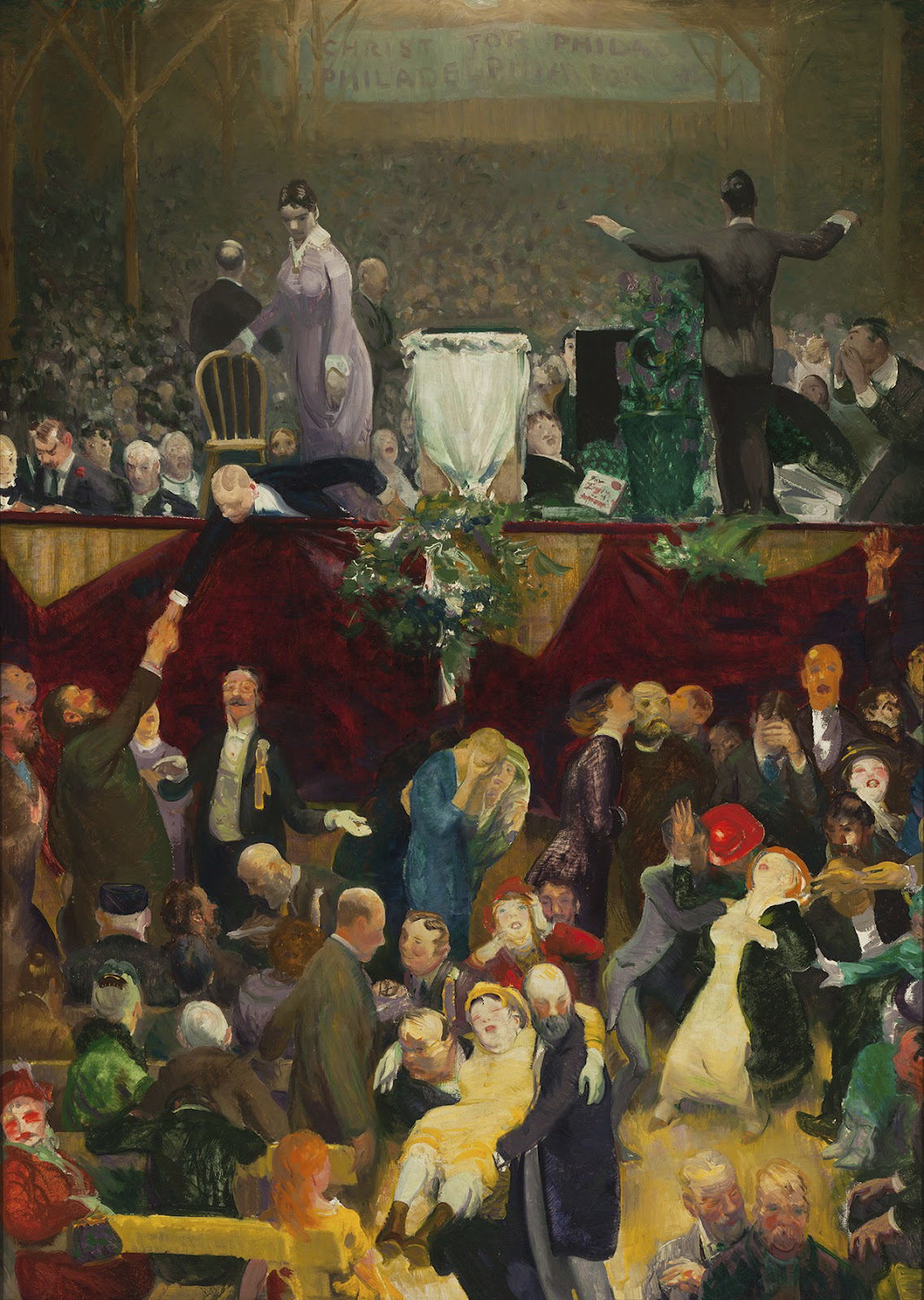
The Sawdust Trail (1916), Milwaukee Art Museum

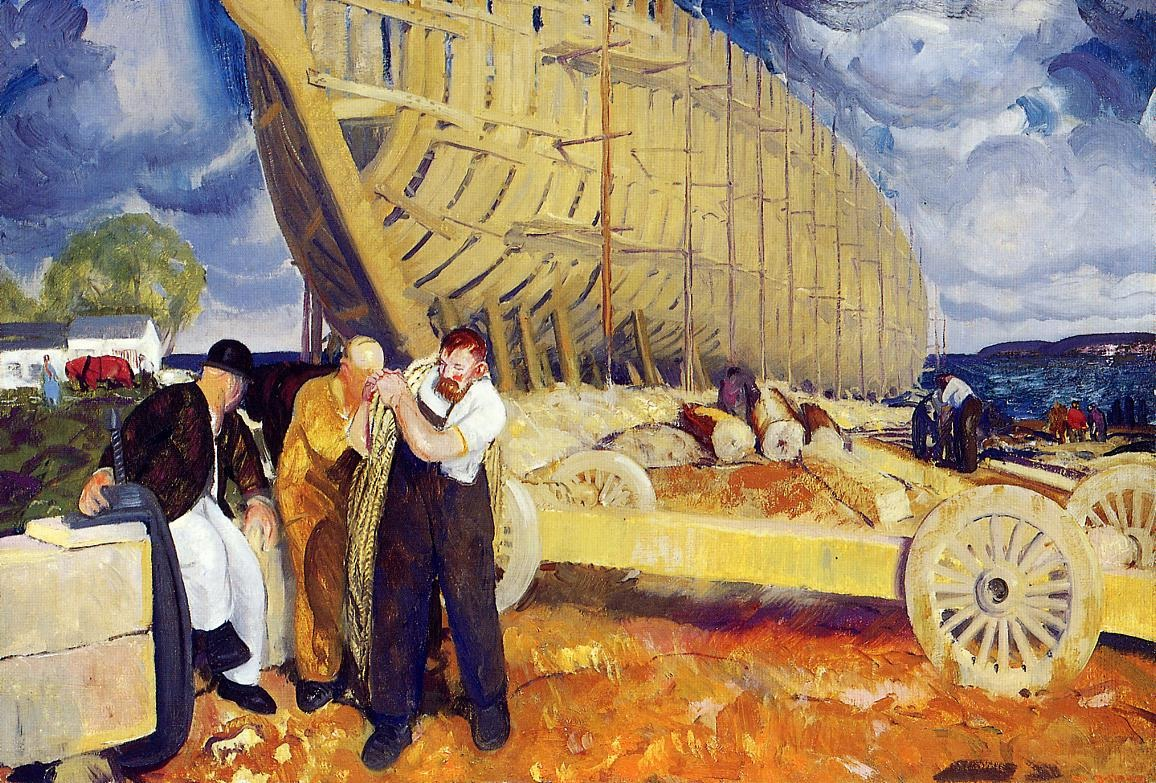
Builders of Ships (1916)

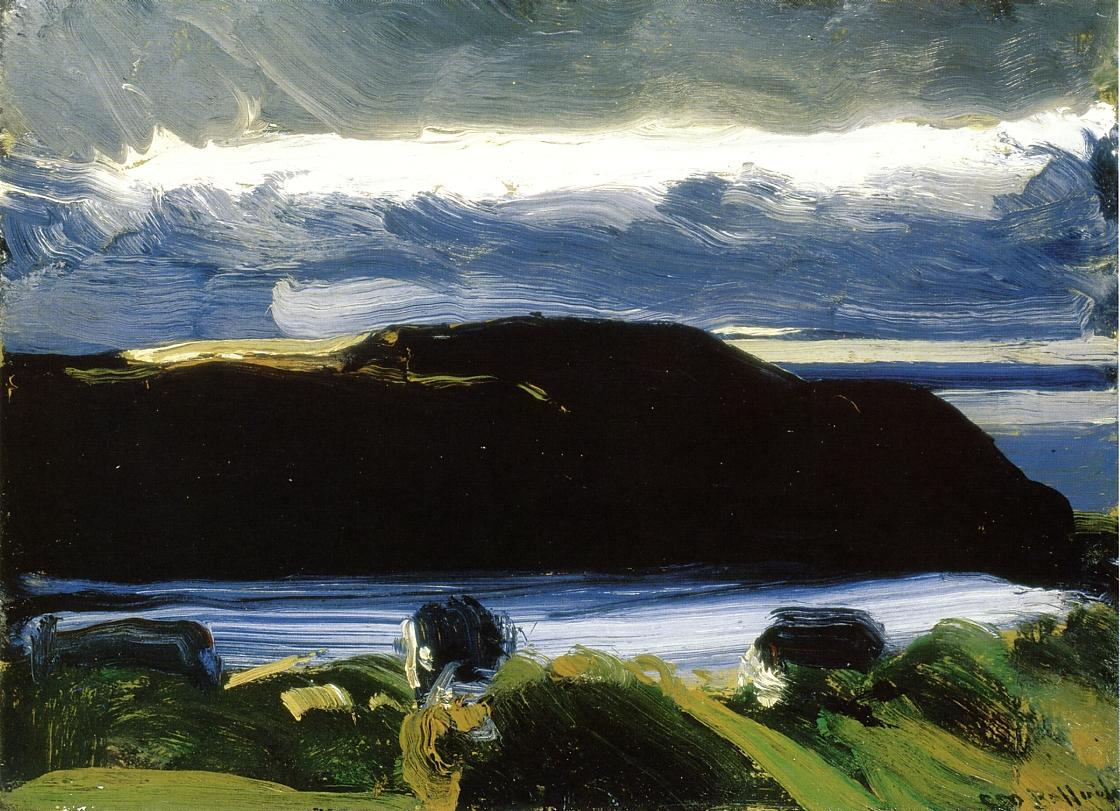
Breaking Sky, Monhegan, (ca. 1916)

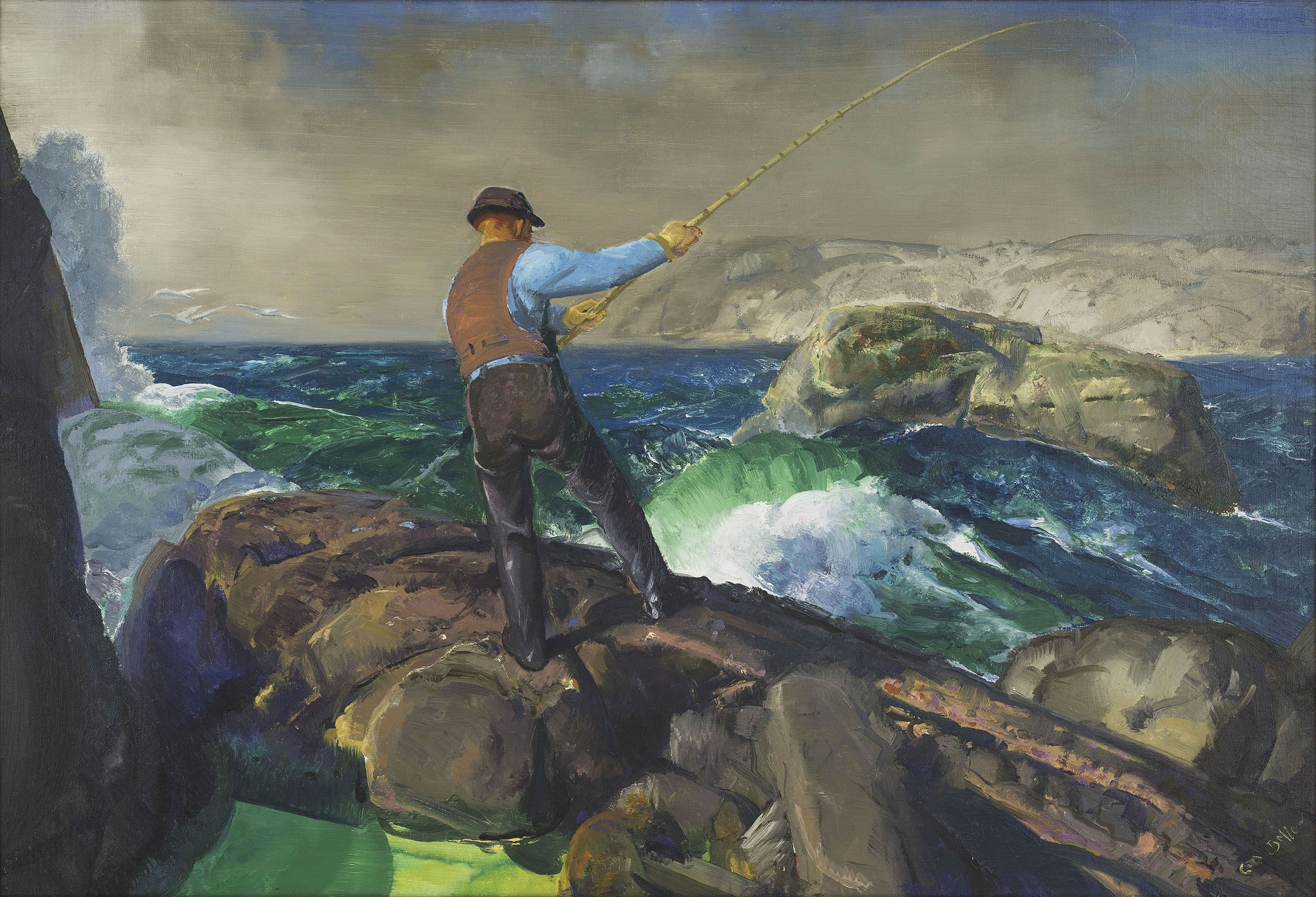
The Fisherman (1917), Amon Carter Museum of American Art

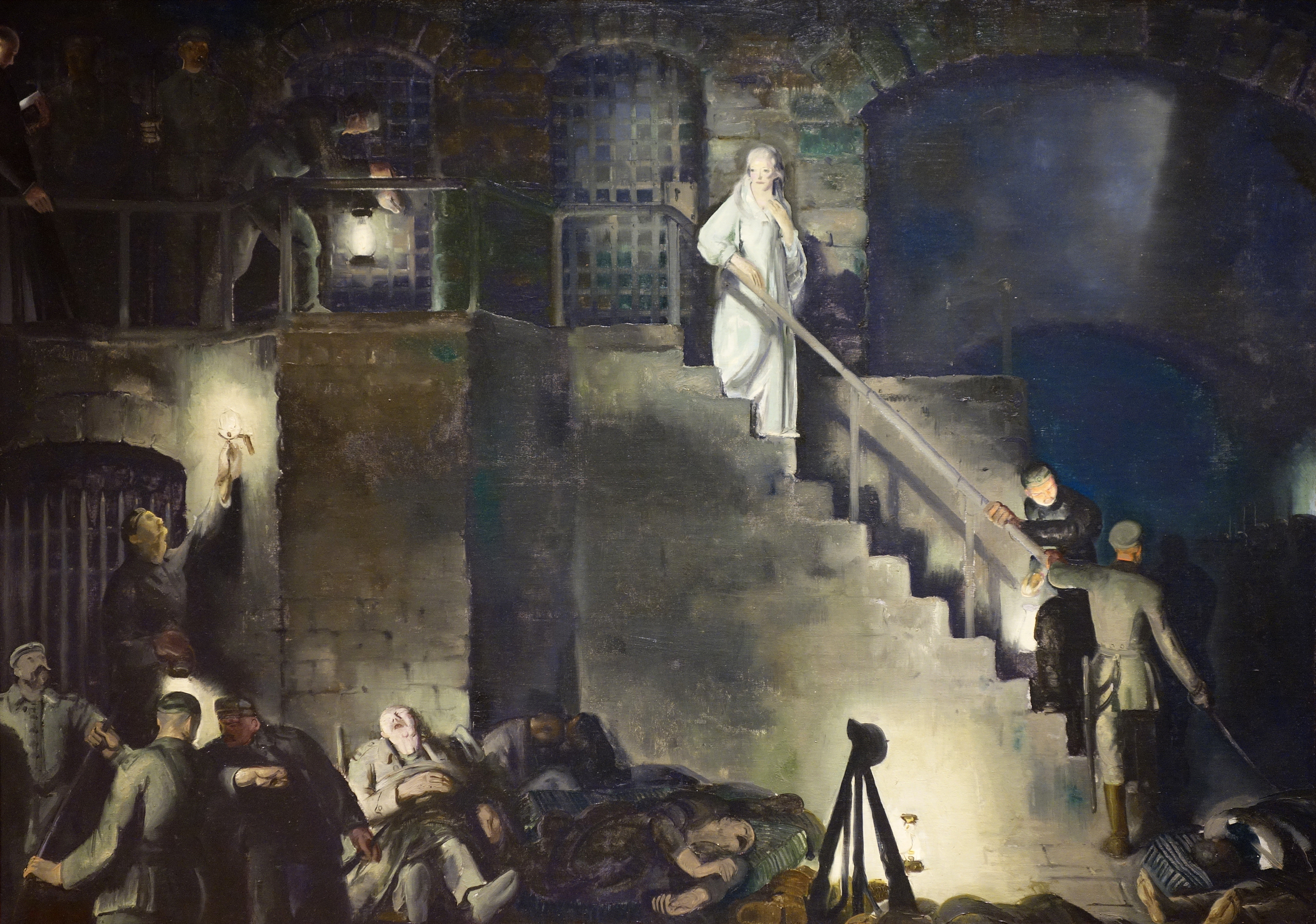
Edith Cavell (1918), Springfield Museums

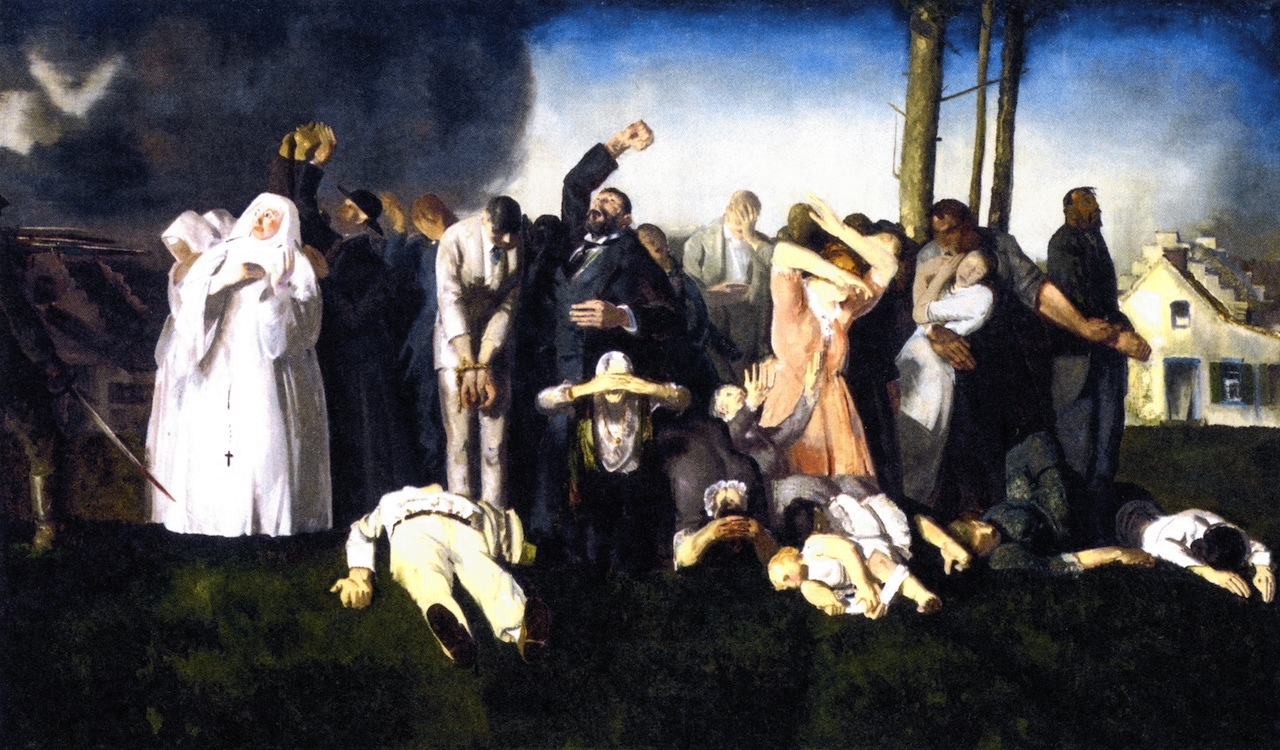
Massacre at Dinant (1918)

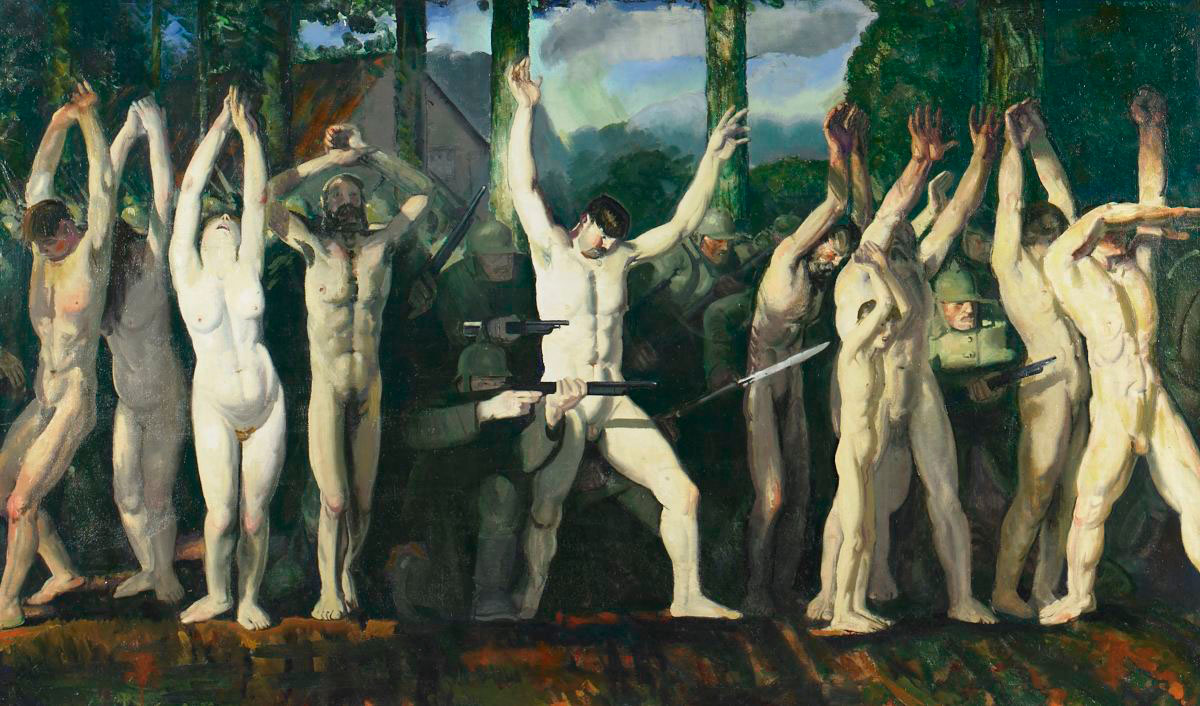
The Barricade (1918)

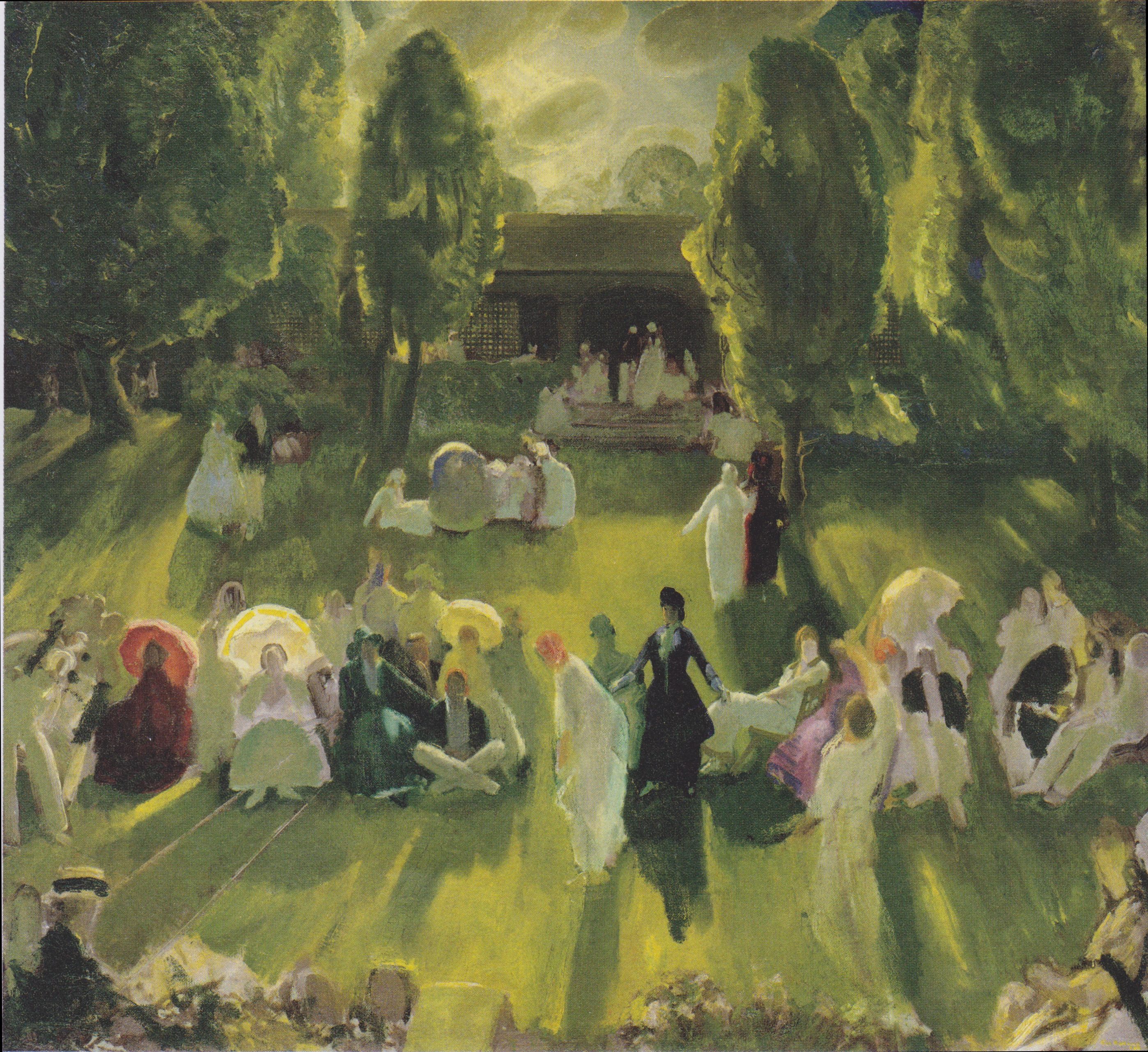
Tennis at Newport (1919)

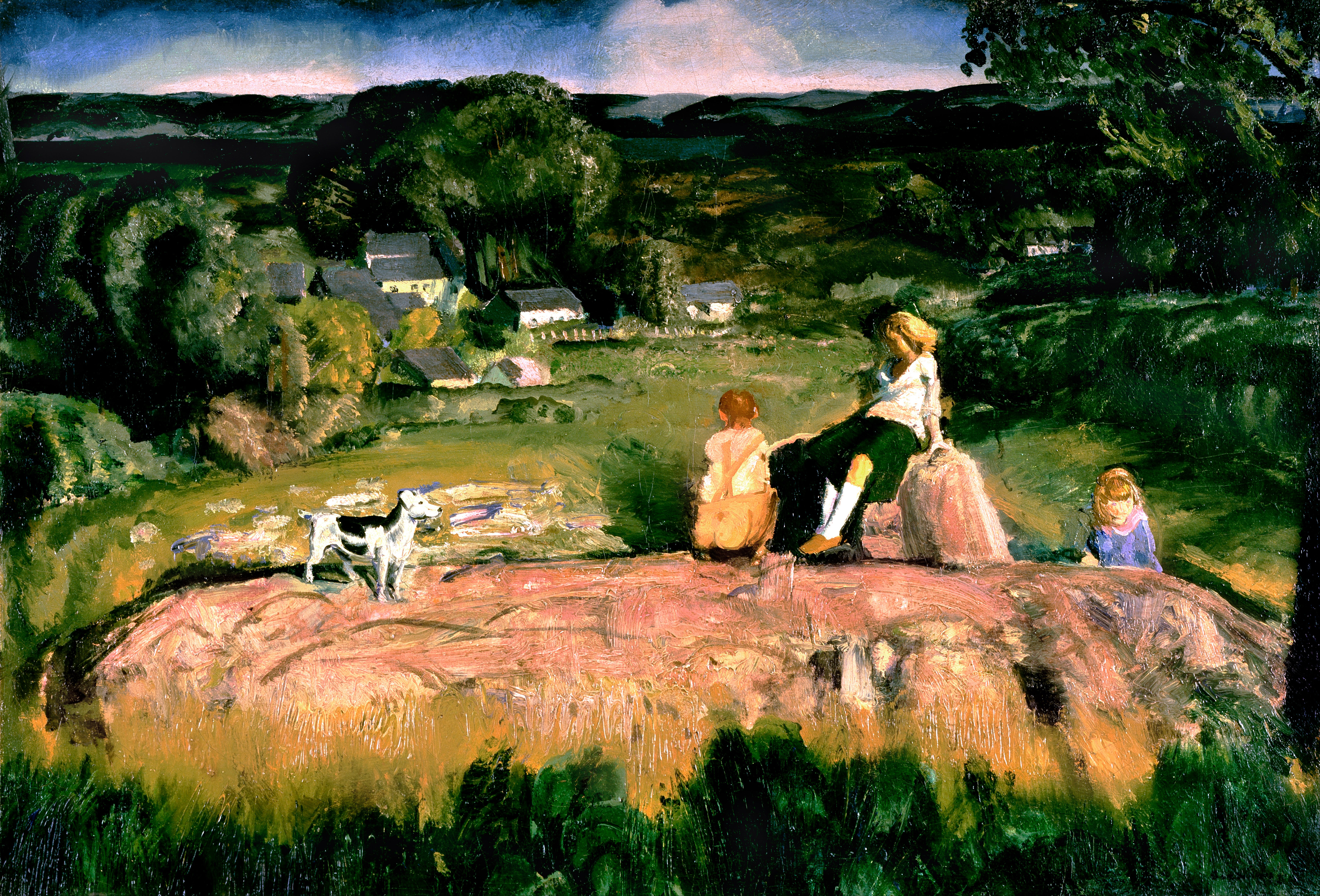
Three Children (1919), White House Art Collection

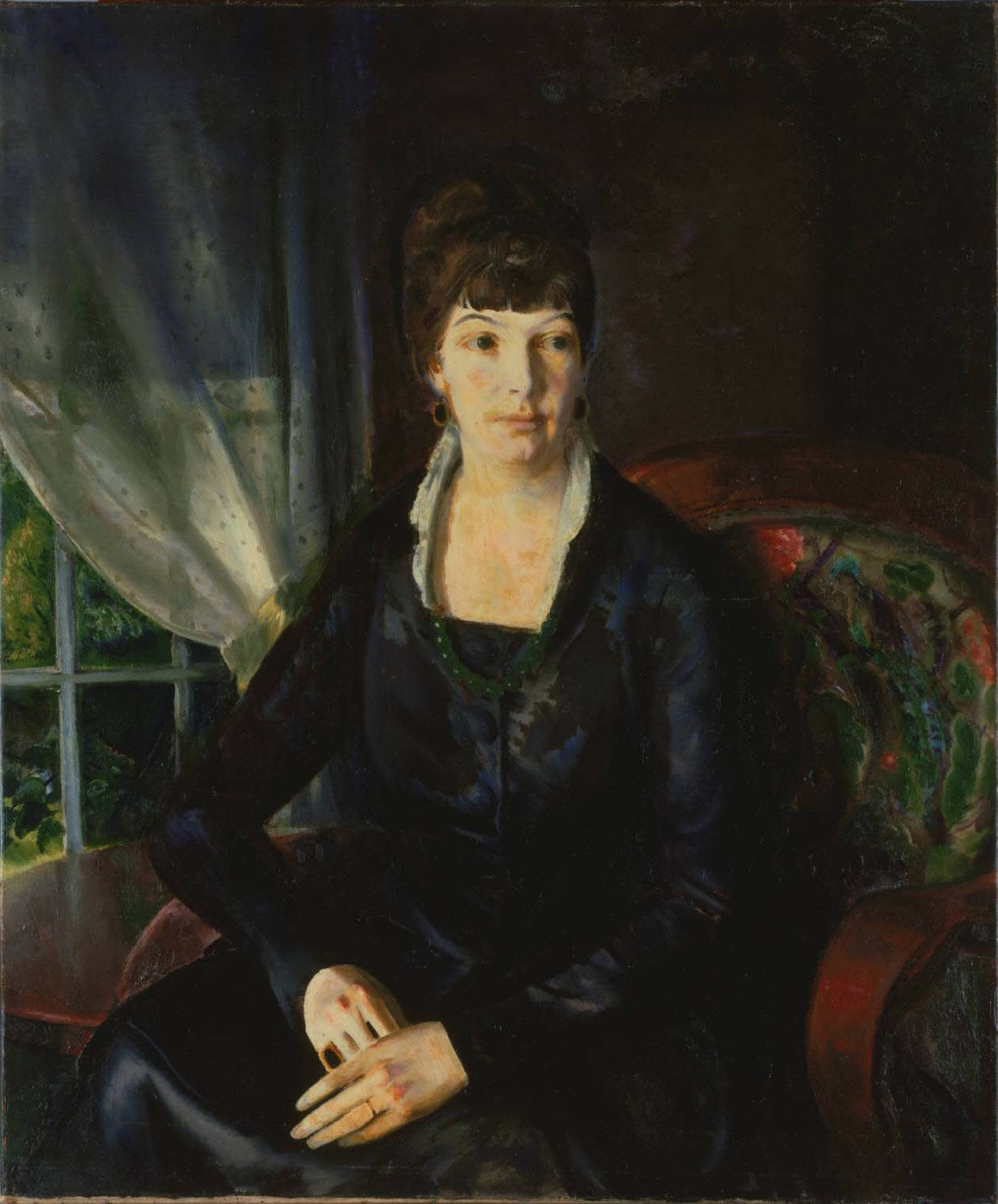
Emma at the Window (1920)

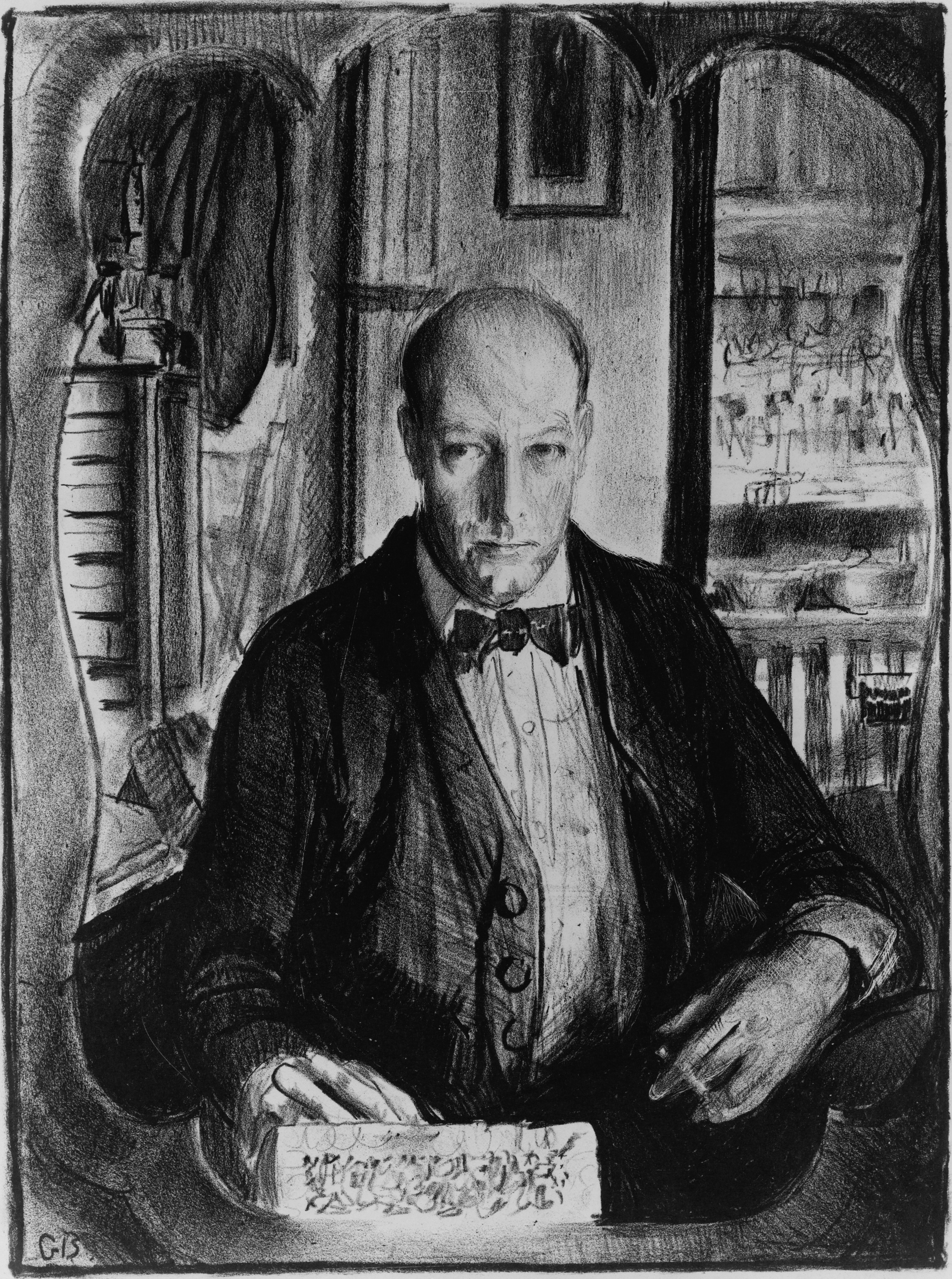
Self-portrait, (1921) Lithograph

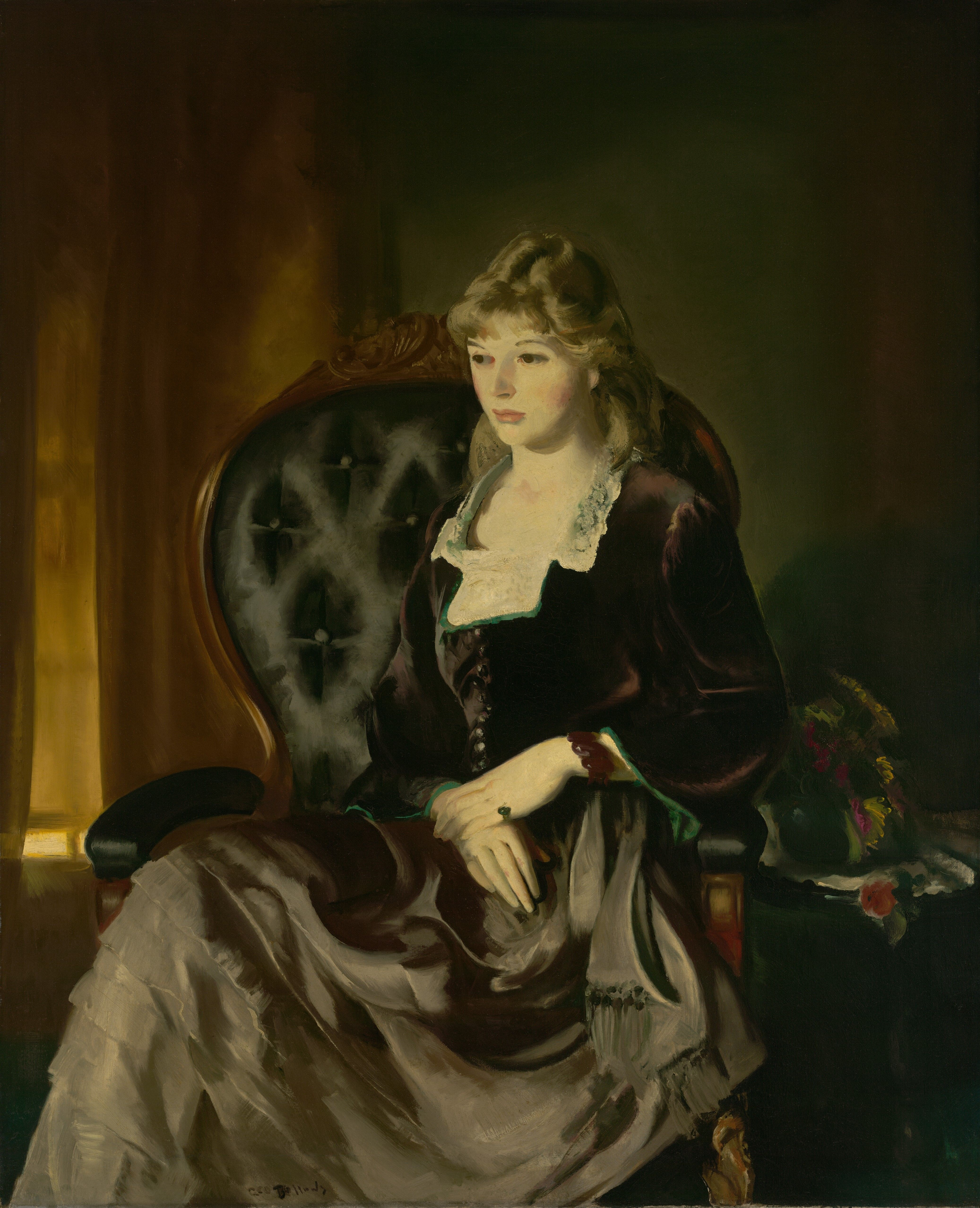
Katherine Rosen (1921)

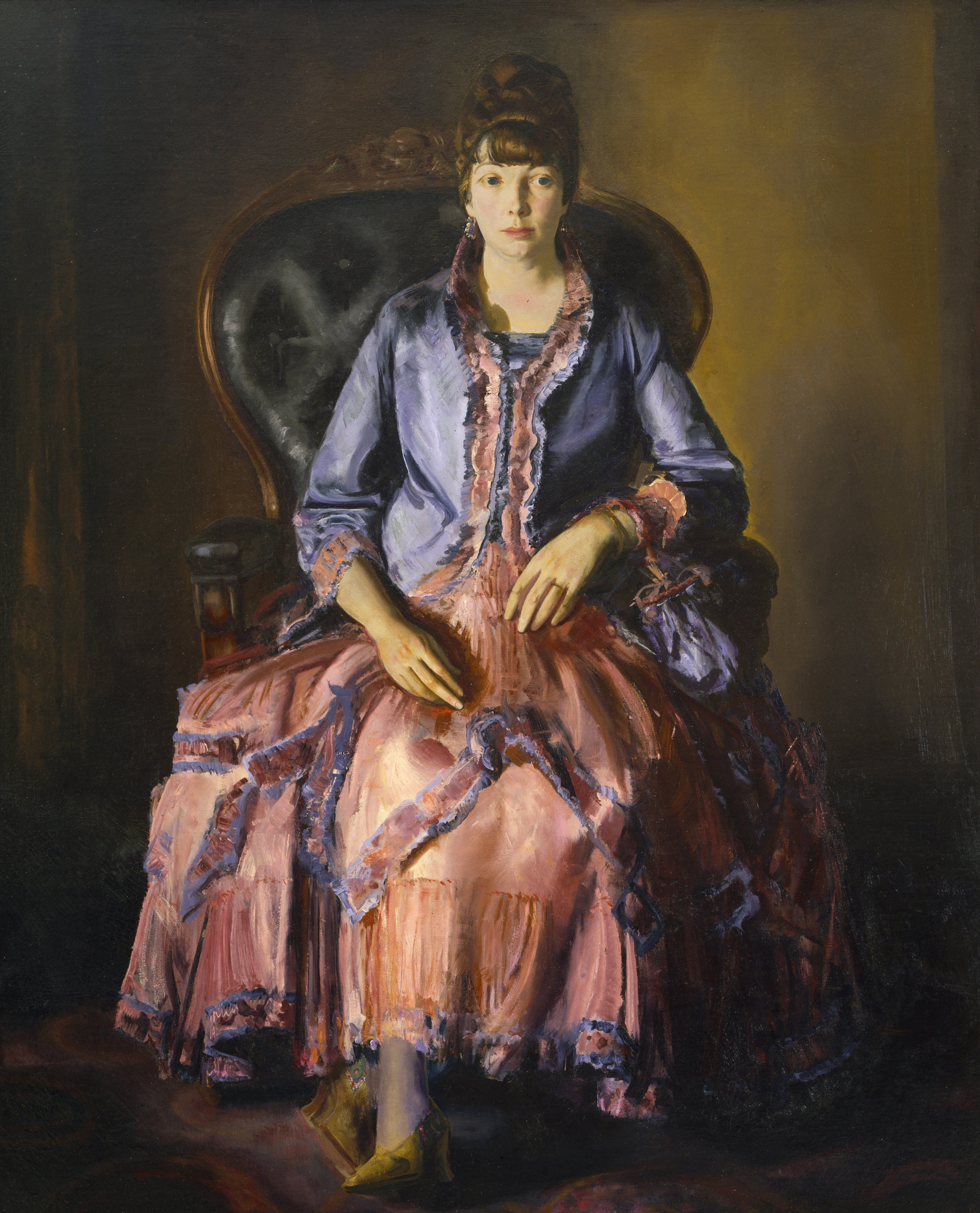
Emma in a Purple Dress (1920–23), Dallas Museum of Art

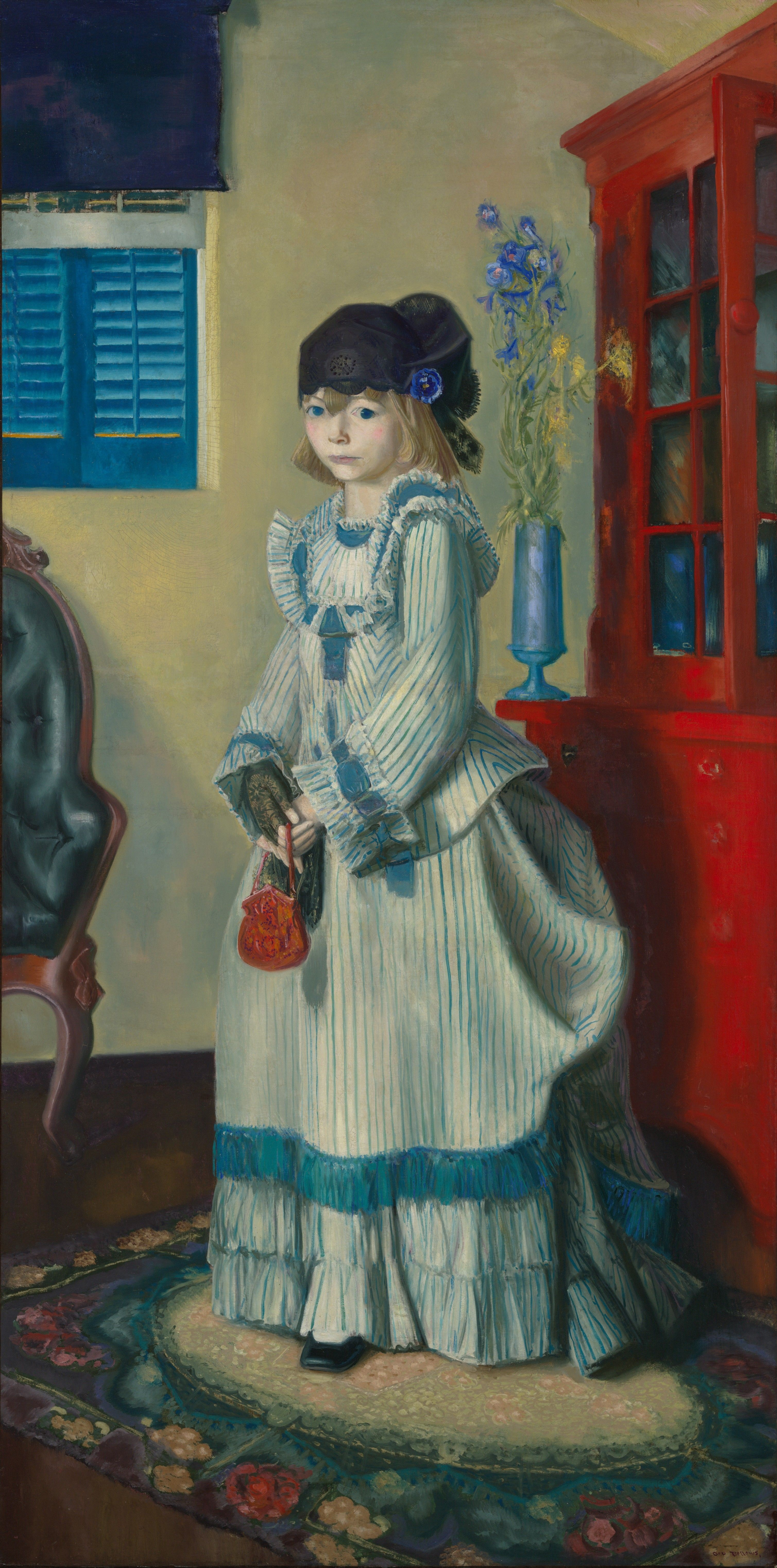
Lady Jean (portrait of Bellows's daughter Jean), 1924, Yale University Art Gallery

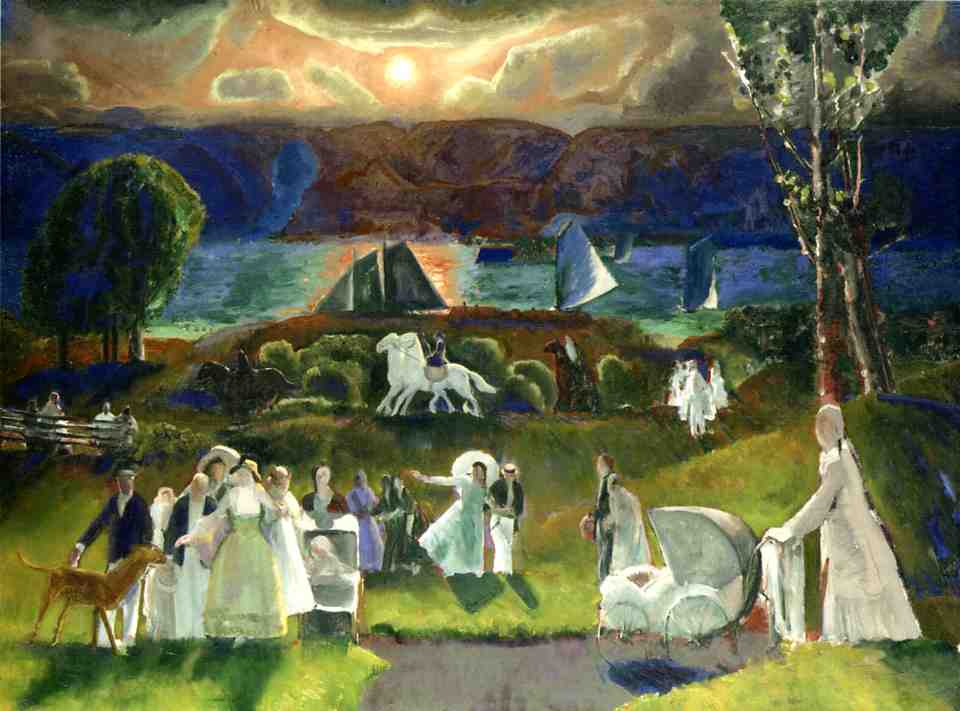
Summer Fantasy (1924)

== See also ==
- List of works by George Wesley Bellows
- Logan Medal of the Arts
