= Cliff dwellers =

Cliff dwellers may refer to:

- Cliff Dwellers (painting), a 1913 painting by George Bellows
- The Cliff Dwellers Club of Chicago, an arts organization founded in 1907
- North American tribes who practice cliff dwelling
