= Chester Dale =

American banker and art collector

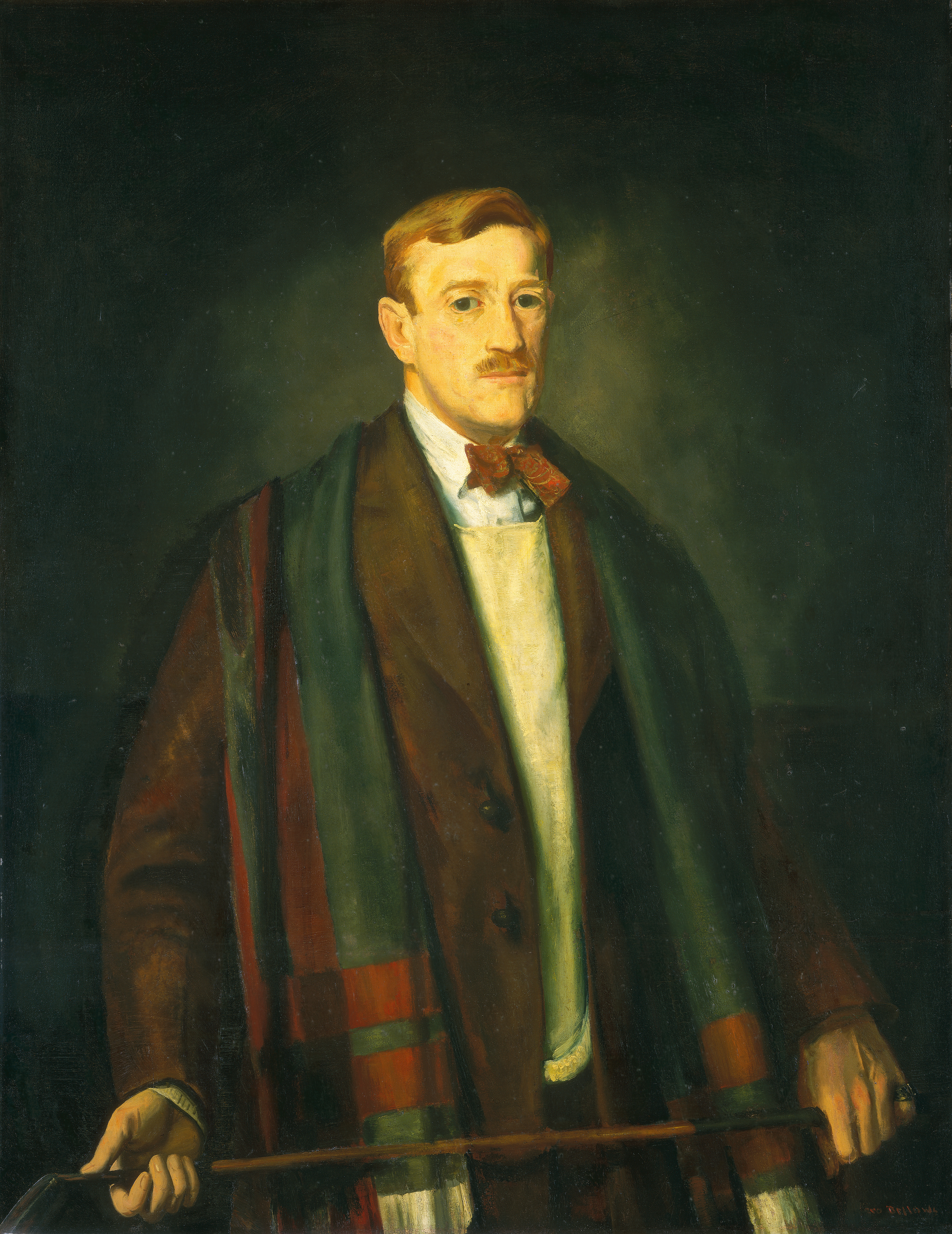
- Portrait of Dale (1922) by George Bellows, now in the National Gallery of Art.
- Born: May 3, 1883; New York City, New York, United States
- Died: December 16, 1962 (aged 79); United States
- Occupation: Banker

Chester Dale (May 3, 1883 – December 16, 1962) was an American banker and art collector. Dale earned his wealth from the New York Stock Exchange, which then allowed him to become a major collector of nineteenth- and twentieth-century French paintings. Major works from his collection were donated to the National Gallery of Art in 1941, as well as via bequest in 1963.

== Career ==
Dale began his career in finance at the age of fifteen in his native New York City as a runner for the New York Stock Exchange. In time, he acquired assets that included utilities, railroads, and municipal bonds in both the United States and Canada.

== Art collection ==
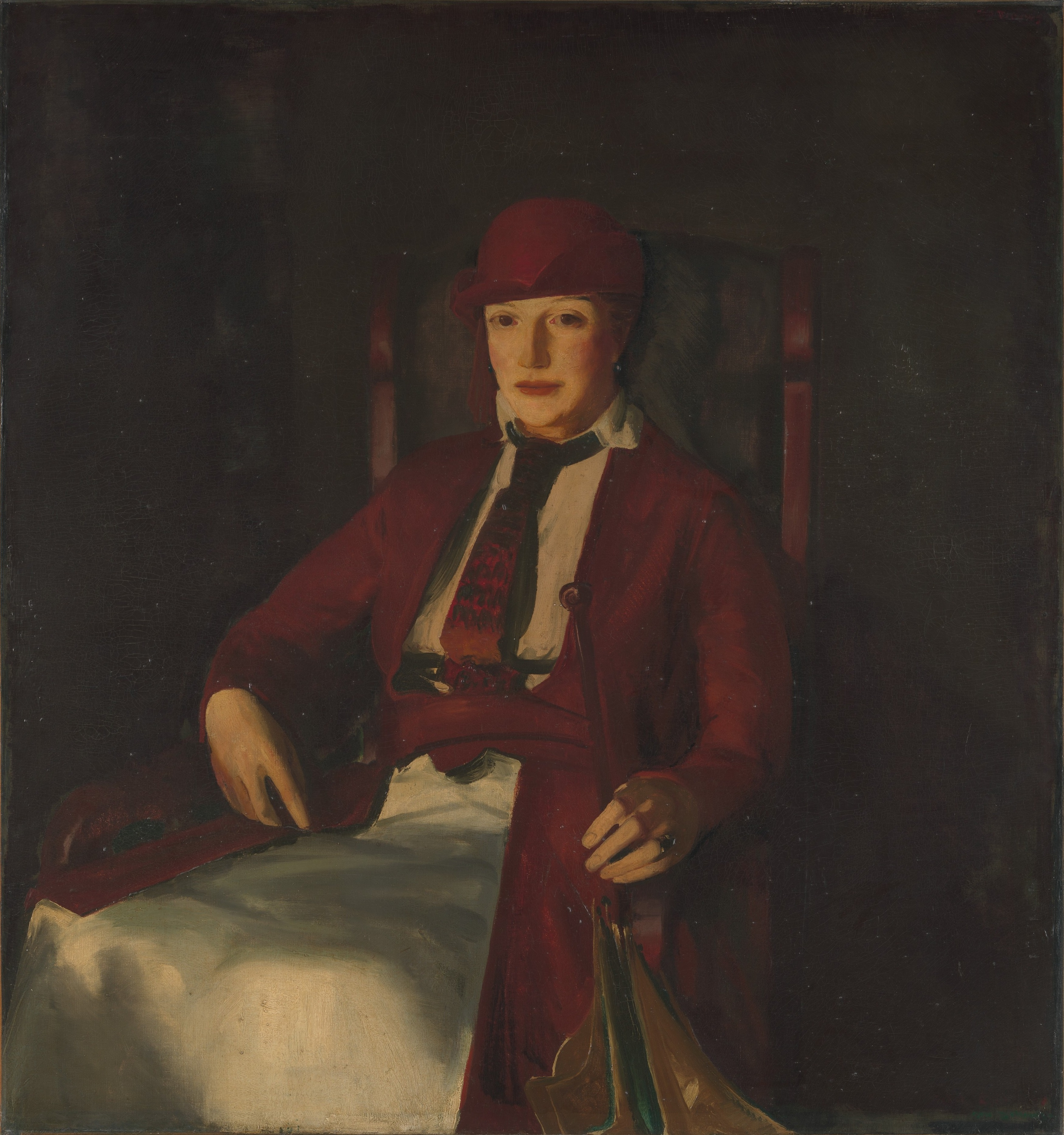
Portrait of Maud Murray (1919), wife of Dale, by Bellows, now in the Metropolitan Museum of Art.

In 1910, Dale married Maud Murray, a painter and art critic, who introduced him to the idea of collecting modern art. She had her portrait painted by the noted artist George Bellows in 1919, and is now in the Metropolitan Museum of Art. Dale followed suit and sat for the artist three years later, and is now in the National Gallery of Art. Dale can be seen holding a golf club, and both he and the artist were semi-professional athletes in their youth.

When the National Gallery of Art opened its doors in 1937, Dale lent twenty-two American paintings, and within a few months, two galleries of French Impressionist paintings. Four years later, he donated another group of works to the museum.

Upon his bequest in 1963, Dale gifted the National Gallery major works by artists such as Paul Cézanne, Jean-Baptiste-Camille Corot, Salvador Dalí, Henri Matisse, Amedeo Modigliani, Henri de Toulouse-Lautrec, as well as the Both Members of This Club by George Bellows, the Portrait of Louis Guillaume by Paul Cézanne and the Family of Saltimbanques by Pablo Picasso. The paintings were obtained from the Dale residence at Plaza Hotel. The entire bequest included over two-hundred paintings, seven sculptures, twenty-two prints, over one-thousand sales catalogs, and over one-thousand books. Additionally, three fellowships were established through a $500,000 endowment.

== President of the National Gallery of Art ==
From 1955 to the year of his death in 1962, Dale served as president of the National Gallery of Art.

== See also ==
- List of people from New York City
- Otto Wacker
