= The Lone Tenement =

1909 painting by George Bellows

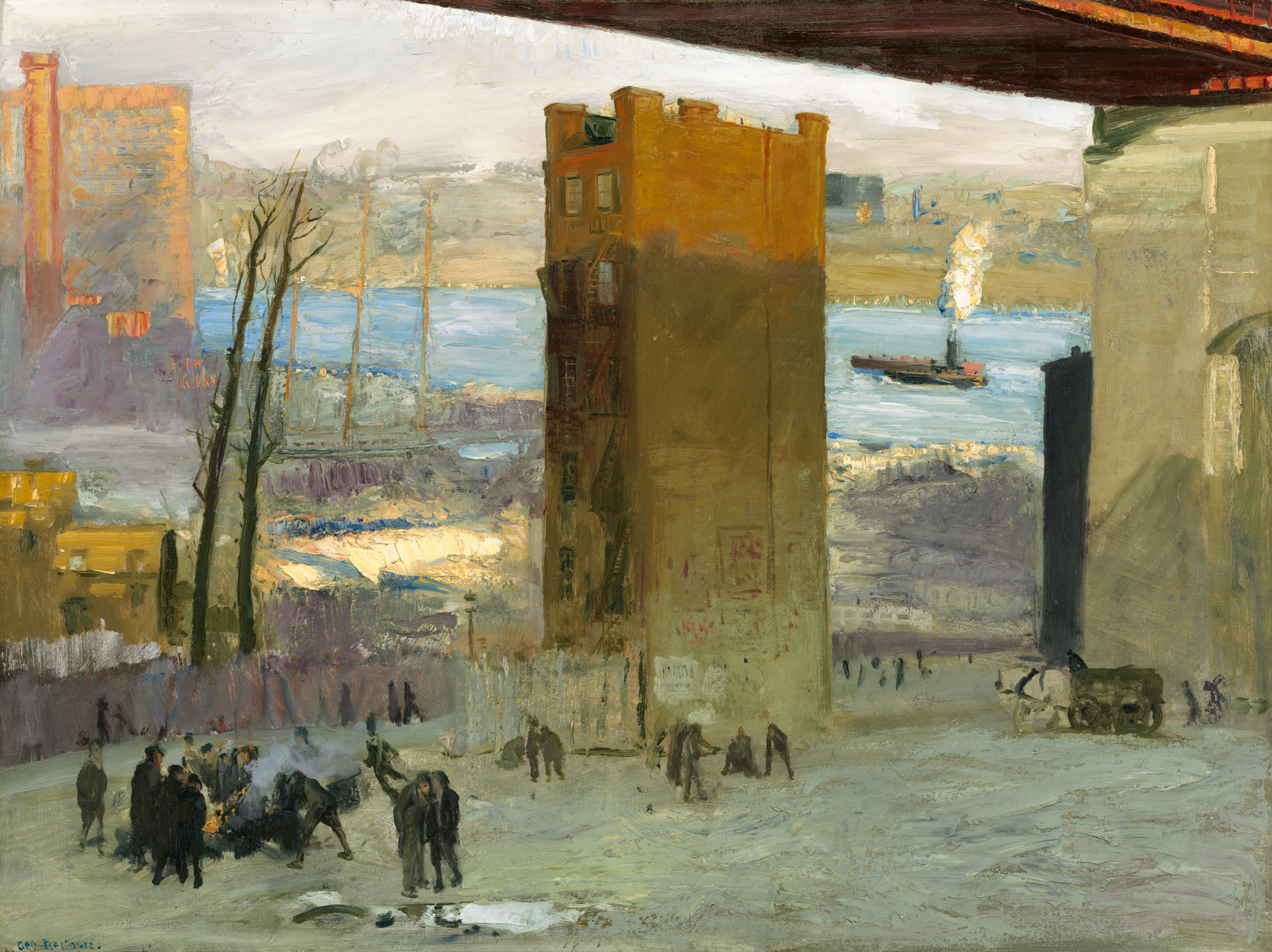
- Artist: George Bellows
- Year: 1909
- Medium: Oil on canvas
- Dimensions: 91.8 cm × 122.3 cm (36.1 in × 48.1 in)
- Location: National Gallery of Art, Washington, D.C.
- Accession: 1963.10.83

The Lone Tenement is a 1909 oil-on-canvas painting by George Bellows, 91.8 cm × 122.3 cm in size. It is on display at the National Gallery of Art.

== Summary ==
From 1907 to 1909, Bellows was interested in depicting construction projects in New York City, such as the excavation site of Pennsylvania Station. In December 1909, he began work on The Lone Tenement, which depicts the near-complete Blackwell's Island Bridge. Instead of the bridge itself, which was a symbol of the city's modernization, Bellows chose to focus on the last apartment building which remained at the site, along with a group of impoverished figures nearby, warming themselves by a fire.

Such buildings were common at the time and were associated with the city's growing immigrant population, who lived in overcrowded and unsanitary conditions. The Tenement House Law of 1901 led to their gradual replacement. In a conversation regarding his 1908 painting Excavation at Night, Bellows stated, "Those tenement houses behind the excavation always give me the creeps. They're just ordinary houses—but there is something about them that gets me." He would later depict tenements in his 1913 painting Cliff Dwellers. Bellows' teacher, Robert Henri, had recommended such locations be a focus of modern art. It is possible that Bellows intended to depict the communities that are lost during redevelopment projects, or that the social status of those depicted remains after urban modernization.

== See also ==
- History of New York City (1898–1945)
- List of works by George Wesley Bellows
