= Tenement Flats (painting) =

1934 painting by Millard Sheets

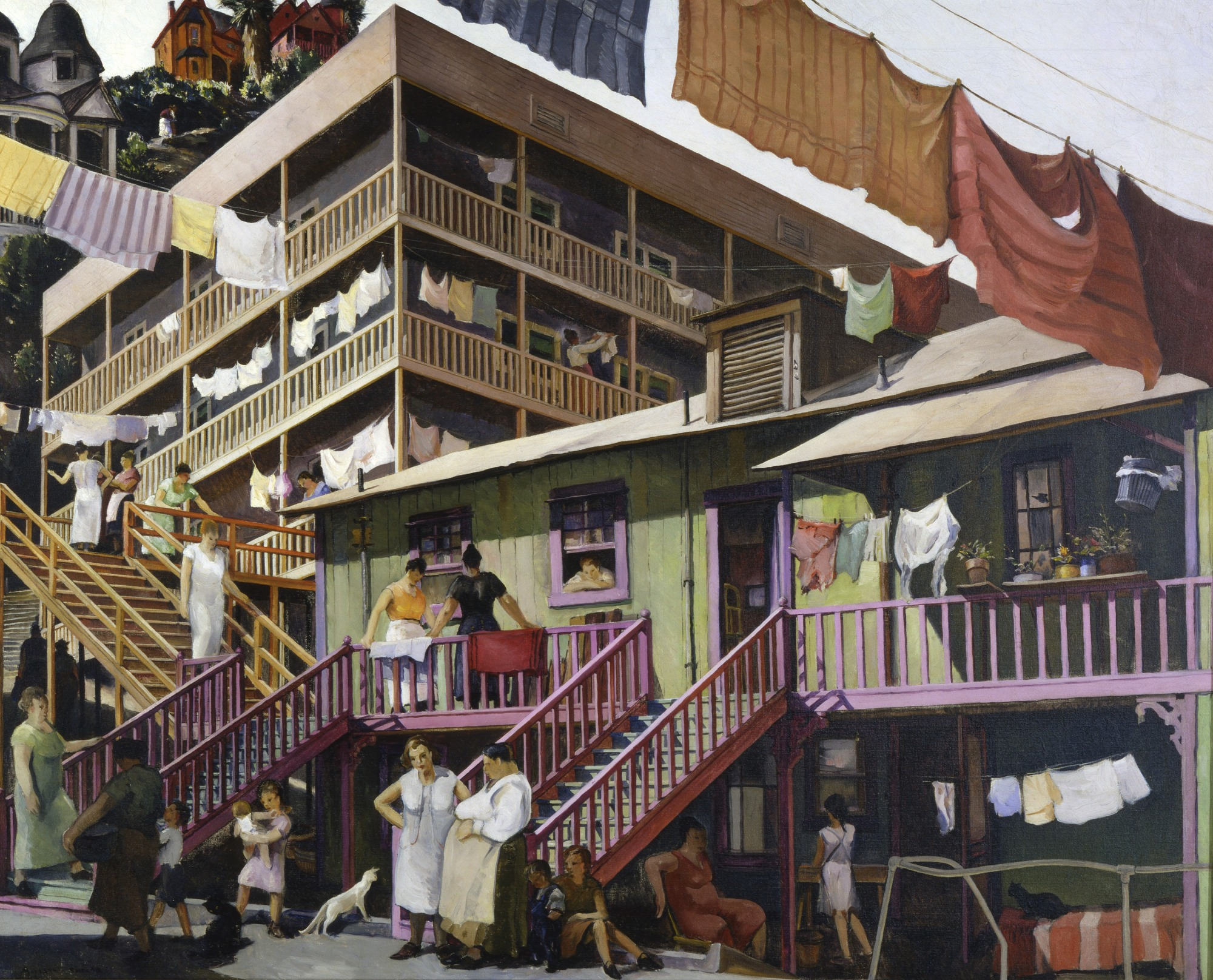
- Artist: Millard Sheets
- Year: 1933–1934
- Dimensions: 102.2 cm × 127.6 cm (40.25 in × 50.25 in)
- Location: Smithsonian Museum of American Art

Tenement Flats is an oil painting made in 1933–1934 by California artist Millard Sheets for the U.S. government's Public Works of Art Project. It depicts working-class families hanging out their laundry to dry in the Bunker Hill neighborhood of Los Angeles. Disney Concert Hall stands, at present, on the approximate site of the painting. The subject matter and composition were derived from the 1913 painting Cliff Dwellers by George Bellows, which was "arguably the best painting on public display" in the city of Los Angeles at that time, and work that Sheets "had studied...carefully." A 1931 picture by Sheets, Angel's Flight, provides another perspective on the same location, albeit with a more "noir" approach to the scene. A lithograph variant of the image was titled Family Flats.

In 1934, Franklin D. Roosevelt selected Tenement Flats from a show of PWAP artwork at the Corcoran Gallery to be displayed in the executive-branch office buildings. Tenement Flats traveled with the Smithsonian's 2012 touring exhibit, 1934: A New Deal for Artists.

== Sources ==
- Robertson, Bruce (June 2006). "Millard Sheets's Tenement Flats". American Art. 20 (2): 7–9. doi:10.1086/507492. ISSN 1073-9300. JSTOR 10.1086/507492.
