= List of works by George Wesley Bellows =

This is a list of paintings by the American artist and realist painter, George Bellows.

== Paintings ==
Image	Title	Date	Technique	Dimensions	Current location
	Portrait of a Young Man	undated	oil on canvas	61.2 cm × 50.8 cm	Private Collection
	Old Fisherman	after 1904	oil on canvas	74.9 cm × 62.2 cm	Terra Foundation of American Art
	Robin, Portrait of Clifton Webb	1905	oil on canvas	113 cm × 77.5 cm	Private Collection
	Man and Dog	1905	oil on canvas	106.6 cm × 66 cm	Columbus Museum of Art
	Bethesda Fountain	1905	oil on canvas	51.4 cm × 61.8 cm	Hirshhorn Museum and Sculpture Garden
	Head of Boy	1905	oil on canvas	51.7 cm × 41.2 cm	Private Collection
	The Black Derby	1905	oil on canvas	66 cm × 50.2 cm	Private Collection
	Miss Bentham	1906	oil on canvas	182 cm × 91 cm	Barber Institute of Fine Arts
	Swans in Central Park	1906	oil on canvas	46.7 cm × 54.3 cm	Metropolitan Museum of Art
	Kids	1906	oil on canvas	82.2 cm × 107.6 cm	Virginia Museum of Fine Arts
	Cross-Eyed Boy	1906	oil on canvas	50.8 cm × 40.6 cm	Mead Art Museum
	Portrait of August Lundberg	1907	oil on canvas	64.1 cm × 45.7 cm	Bruce Museum of Arts and Sciences
	Uncle Charles	1907	oil on canvas	55.9 cm × 45.7 cm	Private Collection
	Portrait of Prosper Invernizzi	1907	oil on canvas	96.5 cm × 76.2 cm	Private Collection
	Club Night	1907	oil on canvas	109.2 cm × 135 cm	National Gallery of Art
	Frankie, the Organ Boy	1907	oil on canvas	122.5 cm × 87 cm	The Nelson-Atkins Museum of Art
	Forty-two Kids	1907	oil on canvas	106.7 cm × 153 cm	National Gallery of Art
	Little Girl in White (Queenie Burnett)	1907	oil on canvas	158 cm × 87 cm	National Gallery of Art
	Portrait of a Laughing Boy	1907	oil on canvas	61 cm × 46.4 cm	Private Collection
	Pennsylvania Station Excavation	1907–1908	oil on canvas	79.3 cm × 91.3 cm	Brooklyn Museum
	Steaming Streets	1908	oil on canvas	97.5 cm × 76.2 cm	Santa Barbara Museum of Art
	A Cloudy Day	1908	oil on canvas	76.3 cm × 98 cm	Hirshhorn Museum and Sculpture Garden
	Excavation at Night	1908	oil on canvas	86.4 cm × 111.8 cm	Crystal Bridges Museum of American Art
	The Newsboy	1908	oil on canvas	76 cm × 55.5 cm	Brooklyn Museum
	Rain on the River	1908	oil on canvas	82.2 cm × 97.2 cm	Rhode Island School of Design
	Portrait of Paddy Flannigan	1908	oil on canvas	76.8 cm × 63.5 cm	Private Collection
	Haystacks and Barn	1909	oil on canvas	56.5 cm × 71.4 cm	Houston Museum of Fine Arts
	The Brook	1909	oil on canvas	70.5 cm × 85.1 cm	Chrysler Museum of Art
	The Lone Tenement	1909	oil on canvas	91.8 cm × 122.3 cm	National Gallery of Art
	Summer City	1909	oil on canvas	82.2 cm × 107.6 cm	Virginia Museum of Fine Arts
	The Warships	1909	oil on canvas	77.3 cm × 97.8 cm	Hirshhorn Museum and Sculpture Garden
	Bridge, Blackwell's Island	1909	oil on canvas	86.5 cm × 11.2 cm	Toledo Museum of Art
	Summer Night, Riverside Drive	1909	oil on canvas	90.1 cm × 120.6 cm	Columbus Museum of Art
	Nude Girl, Miss Leslie Hall	1909	oil on canvas	152.4 cm × 106.7 cm	Terra Foundation of American Art
	Both Members of This Club	1909	oil on canvas	115 cm × 160.5 cm	National Gallery of Art
	Stag at Sharkey's	1909	oil on canvas	92 cm × 122.6 cm	Cleveland Museum of Art
	The Palisades	1909	oil on canvas	76.2 cm × 96.8 cm	Terra Foundation for American Art
	Blue Morning	1909	oil on canvas	86.3 cm × 111.7 cm	National Gallery of Art
	Floating Ice	1910	oil on canvas	114.3 cm × 160 cm	Whitney Museum of Art
	A Morning Snow - Hudson River	1910	oil on canvas	114.5 cm × 160.5 cm	Brooklyn Museum
	Blue Snow, The Battery	1910	oil on canvas	86.3 cm × 111.7 cm	Columbus Museum of Art
	Polo at Lakewood	1910	oil on canvas	114.9 cm × 161.2 cm	Columbus Museum of Art
	Seated Nude	1910–1911	oil on canvas	61 cm × 40.6 cm	de Young Museum
	Gorge and Sea	1911	oil on canvas	86.4 cm × 66 cm	Mint Museum
	The Sea	1911	oil on canvas	86.3 cm × 111.7 cm	Hirshhorn Museum and Sculpture Garden
	The Gulls, Monhegan	1911	oil on canvas	28.5 cm × 38.8 cm	Addison Gallery of American Art
	Afternoon Whitehead	1911	oil on canvas	27.9 cm × 36.8 cm	Private Collection
	Snow Dumpers	1911	oil on canvas	114.3 cm × 161.3 cm	Columbus Museum of Art
	Snow-Capped River	1911	oil on canvas	114.9 cm × 63.2 cm	Telfair Museums
	Three Rollers	1911	oil on canvas	100.6 cm × 106 cm	National Academy of Design
	New York	1911	oil on canvas	106.7 cm × 152.4 cm	National Gallery of Art
	Men of the Docks	1912	oil on canvas	114.3 cm × 161.3 cm	National Gallery
	The Circus	1912	oil on canvas	86 cm × 111.8 cm	
	A Day in June	1913	oil on canvas	106.6 cm × 121.9 cm	Detroit Institute of Art
	Cliff Dwellers	1913	oil on canvas	102 cm × 106.8 cm	Los Angeles County Museum of Art
	Monhegan Island, Maine	1913	oil on canvas	45.7 cm × 55.9 cm	Worcester Art Museum
	Sun Glow	1913	oil on panel	38.1 cm × 49.5 cm	Private Collection
	The Big Dory	1913	oil on canvas	45.7 cm × 55.8 cm	New Britain Museum of American Art
	Approach to the Bridge at Night	1913	oil on canvas	86.3 cm × 111.7 cm	Chazen Museum of Art
	Gray Sea	1913	oil on canvas	33 cm × 49.5 cm	Columbus Museum of Art
	The Harbor, Monhegan Coast, Maine	1913	oil on canvas	38.1 cm × 49.5 cm	Minneapolis Institute of Art
	George Wesley Bellows - The Launching - 1951.63.1 - Reading Public Museum.jpg	1913	oil on canvas	45.72 cm × 55.88 cm	Reading Public Museum
	Vine Clad Shore - Monhegan Island	1913	oil on canvas	50.8 cm × 61 cm	Smithsonian American Art Museum
	Rock Reef, Maine	1913	oil on canvas	38.1 cm × 49.5 cm	Houston Museum of Fine Arts
	Storm Sea	1913	oil on canvas	33 cm × 49.5 cm	Private Collection
	Day of Dreams	1913	oil on canvas	38.1 cm × 49.5 cm	Private Collection
	A Fresh Breeze	1913	oil on canvas	38.1 cm × 49.5 cm	Yale University Art Gallery
	Iron Coast, Monhegan	1913	oil on canvas	37.1 cm × 48.2 cm	Mohegan Museum of Art & History
	Fog Breakers	1913	oil on canvas	36.8 cm × 48.3 cm	Georgia Museum of Art
	Boat Landing	1913	oil on canvas	38.1 cm × 49.5 cm	Private Collection
	Approach of Rain	1913	oil on canvas	33.7 cm × 49.5 cm	Private Collection
	Tide Ledge	1913	oil on canvas	33.7 cm × 49.5 cm	Private Collection
	The Grove	1913	oil on canvas	36.1 cm × 47.9 cm	Houston Museum of Fine Arts
	Through the Trees, Monhegan Island, Maine	1913	oil on panel	38.1 cm × 49.5 cm	Private Collection
	Geraldine Lee, No. 1	1914	oil on canvas	55.8 cm × 45.7 cm	Mildred Lane Kemper Art Museum
	Jackie (Jacqueline Hudson)	1914	oil on canvas	62.2 cm × 62.9 cm	Private Collection
	Madeline Davis	1914	oil on canvas	76.2 cm × 63.5 cm	Private Collection
	River Front No. 1	1914	oil on canvas	115.3 cm × 160.3 cm	Columbus Museum of Art
	A Grandmother	1914	oil on canvas	94 cm × 74.5 cm	Thyssen-Bornemisza Museum
	Geraldine Lee, No. 2	1914	oil on canvas	96.5 cm × 76.2 cm	Butler Institute of American Art
	Julie Hudson	1914	oil on canvas	76.2 cm × 63.5 cm	Metropolitan Museum of Art
	Emma at the Piano	1914	oil on canvas	73 cm × 94 cm	Chrysler Museum of Art
	Portrait of Florence Pierce	1914	oil on canvas	96.5 cm × 76.2 cm	Houston Museum of Fine Arts
	Portrait of Florence Budd	1914	oil on canvas	99.1 cm × 78.7 cm	Private Collection
	Love of Winter	1914	oil on canvas	81.6 cm × 101.6 cm	Art Institute of Chicago
	Florence Davey	1914	oil on canvas	96.5 cm × 76 cm	National Gallery of Art
	Portrait of Walter Littlefield	1914	oil on canvas	76.2 cm × 63.5 cm	Rhode Island School of Design
	Nude Girl and Parrot	1915	oil on canvas	101.6 cm × 81.2 cm	Private Collection
	Anne	1915	oil on canvas	60.9 cm × 48.2 cm	Arkell Museum
	Portrait of Anne	1915	oil on canvas	122.2 cm × 92 cm	High Museum of Art
	In a Rowboat	1916	oil on canvas	77.4 cm × 112.4 cm	Montclair Art Museum
	Ox Team, Wharf at Matinicus	1916	oil on canvas	55.9 cm × 71.1 cm	Metropolitan Museum of Art
	The Teamster	1916	oil on canvas	96.5 cm × 111.7 cm	Farnsworth Art Museum
	Builders of Ships	1916	oil on canvas	76.2 cm × 111.8 cm	Yale University Art Gallery
	Shipyard Society	1916	oil on canvas	76.2 cm × 96.5 cm	Virginia Museum of Fine Arts
	Romance of Criehaven	1916	oil on canvas	45.7 cm × 55.9 cm	de Young Museum
	The Red Vine, Matinicus Island, Maine	1916	oil on canvas	55.9 cm × 71.1 cm	Metropolitan Museum of Art
	Romance of Autumn	1916	oil on canvas	45.7 cm × 55.8 cm	Columbus Museum of Art
	Romance of Autumn	1916	oil on canvas	81.2 cm × 101.6 cm	Farnsworth Art Museum
	Evening Blue (Tending the Lobster Traps, Early Morning)	1916	oil on panel	45.7 cm × 55.9 cm	Private Collection
	Up the Hudson	1916	oil on canvas	91.1 cm × 122.2 cm	Metropolitan Museum of Art
	My Family	1916	oil on canvas	151 cm × 167.8 cm	National Gallery of Art
	Anne with a Japanese Parasol	1917	oil on canvas	150.1 cm × 91.7 cm	National Gallery of Art
	California Headlands	1917	oil on canvas	45.6 cm × 55.8 cm	Princeton University Art Museum
	The Sand Cart	1917	oil on canvas	76.8 cm × 111.9 cm	Brooklyn Museum
	Pueblo Tesuque, No. 2	1917	oil on canvas	87.9 cm × 113.3 cm	Nelson-Atkins Museum of Art
	Study of Emma and the Children	1917	oil on canvas	148.5 cm × 170.5 cm	Boston Museum of Fine Arts
	Anne in Black Velvet	1917	oil on canvas	97.6 cm × 76.3 cm	Mead Art Museum
	The Widow	1917	oil on canvas	101.6 cm × 81.3 cm	Baltimore Museum of Art
	Edith Cavell	1918	oil on canvas	114.3 cm × 160 cm	Springfield Museums
	Massacre at Dinant	1918	oil on canvas	125.7 cm × 210.7 cm	Greenville County Museum of Art
	The Germans Arrive	1918	oil on canvas	125.7 cm × 201.3 cm	National Gallery of Art
	The Barricade	1918	oil on canvas	124.7 cm × 211.4 cm	Birmingham Museum of Art
	Return of the Useless	1918	oil on canvas	149.9 cm × 167.7 cm	Crystal Bridges Museum of American Art
	The Studio	1918	oil on canvas	48 cm × 38 cm	Crystal Bridges Museum of American Art
	The Black Bull	1919	oil on canvas	41.91 cm × 60.96 cm	Mead Art Museum
	Paradise Point	1919	oil on canvas	50.8 cm × 60.9 cm	Private Collection
	Emma in the Purple Dress	1919	oil on canvas	101.6 cm × 81.2 cm	Los Angeles County Museum of Art
	Emma in the Black Print	1919	oil on canvas	101.9 cm × 81.9 cm	Museum of Fine Arts Boston
	Five Cows	1919	oil on canvas	50.8 cm × 61.4 cm	Metropolitan Museum of Art
	Three Children	1919	oil on canvas	77.2 cm × 111.2 cm	The White House
	Tennis at Newport	1919	oil on canvas	101.6 cm × 109.9 cm	Metropolitan Museum of Art
	Portrait of Mrs. Chester Dale	1919	oil on canvas	108 cm × 101.6 cm	Metropolitan Museum of Art
	Maud Dale	1919	oil on canvas	101.5 cm × 85 cm	National Gallery of Art
	Mrs. T. in Cream Silk, No.1	1919	oil on canvas	122.8 cm × 96.5 cm	Hirshhorn Museum and Sculpture Garden
	Mrs. T. in Cream Silk, No.2	1920	oil on canvas	134.6 cm × 109.2 cm	Minneapolis Institute of Art
	Elinor, Jean and Anna	1920	oil on canvas	149.8 cm × 167.6 cm	Buffalo AKG Art Museum
	Nude with Red Hair	1920	oil on canvas	110.9 cm × 86.5 cm	National Gallery of Art
	Little House in the Woods	1920	oil on panel	43.2 cm × 61 cm	Private Collection
	Tennis Tournament	1920	oil on canvas	149.8 cm × 167.6 cm	National Gallery of Art
	Tennis at Newport	1920	oil on canvas	110.5 cm × 135.9 cm	Virginia Museum of Fine Arts
	Nude with Fan	1920	oil on canvas	86.3 cm × 111.7 cm	North Carolina Museum of Art
	The Village Houses	1920	oil on canvas	81.6 cm × 101.6 cm	Art Institute of Chicago
	Aunt Fanny	1920	oil on canvas	110.5 cm × 85.1 cm	Des Moines Art Center
	Emma at the Window	1920	oil on canvas	104.8 cm × 87.3 cm	The Phillips Collection
	Emma in a Purple Dress	1920–1923	oil on canvas	160 cm × 129.5 cm	Dallas Museum of Art
	My Mother	1921	oil on canvas	210.8 cm × 124.4 cm	Art Institute of Chicago
	Portrait of a Boy	1921	oil on canvas	86.3 cm × 76.2 cm	Indianapolis Museum of Art
	Portrait of My Mother No. 1	1921	oil on canvas	78.2 cm × 48.2 cm	Columbus Museum of Art
	Katherine Rosen	1921	oil on canvas	134.6cm × 105.9 cm	Yale University Art Gallery
	The Journey of Youth	1922	oil on canvas	50.8 cm × 132.1 cm	Private Collection
	Chester Dale	1922	oil on canvas	113.7 cm × 88.3 cm	National Gallery of Art
	Portrait of Mrs. Walter H. Richter	1922	oil on canvas	101.6 cm × 81.3 cm	Private Collection
	Portrait of Laura	1922	oil on canvas	101.6 cm × 81.2 cm	The Mennello Museum of American Art
	Three Pigs and a Mountain	1922	oil on canvas	41.9 cm × 60.9 cm	San Diego Museum of Art
	The White Horse	1923	oil on canvas	86.6 cm × 111.7 cm	Worcester Art Museum
	Emma and Her Children	1923	oil on canvas	150.4 cm × 166 cm	Museum of Fine Arts Boston
	Introducing John L. Sullivan	1923	oil on canvas	52.7 cm × 53 cm	Whitney Museum of Art
	Two Women	1924	oil on canvas	150.5 cm × 166.4 cm	Crystal Bridges Museum of American Art
	Lady Jean	1924	oil on canvas	182.9 cm × 91.4 cm	Yale University Art Gallery
	Dempsey and Firpo	1924	oil on canvas	129.5 cm × 160.6 cm	Whitney Museum of Art
	Mr. and Mrs. Phillip Wase	1924	oil on canvas	130.1 cm × 160 cm	Smithsonian American Art Museum
	Barnyard and Chickens	1924	oil on canvas	45.7 cm × 55.9 cm	Private Collection
