= Tennis at Newport =

1919 painting by George Bellows

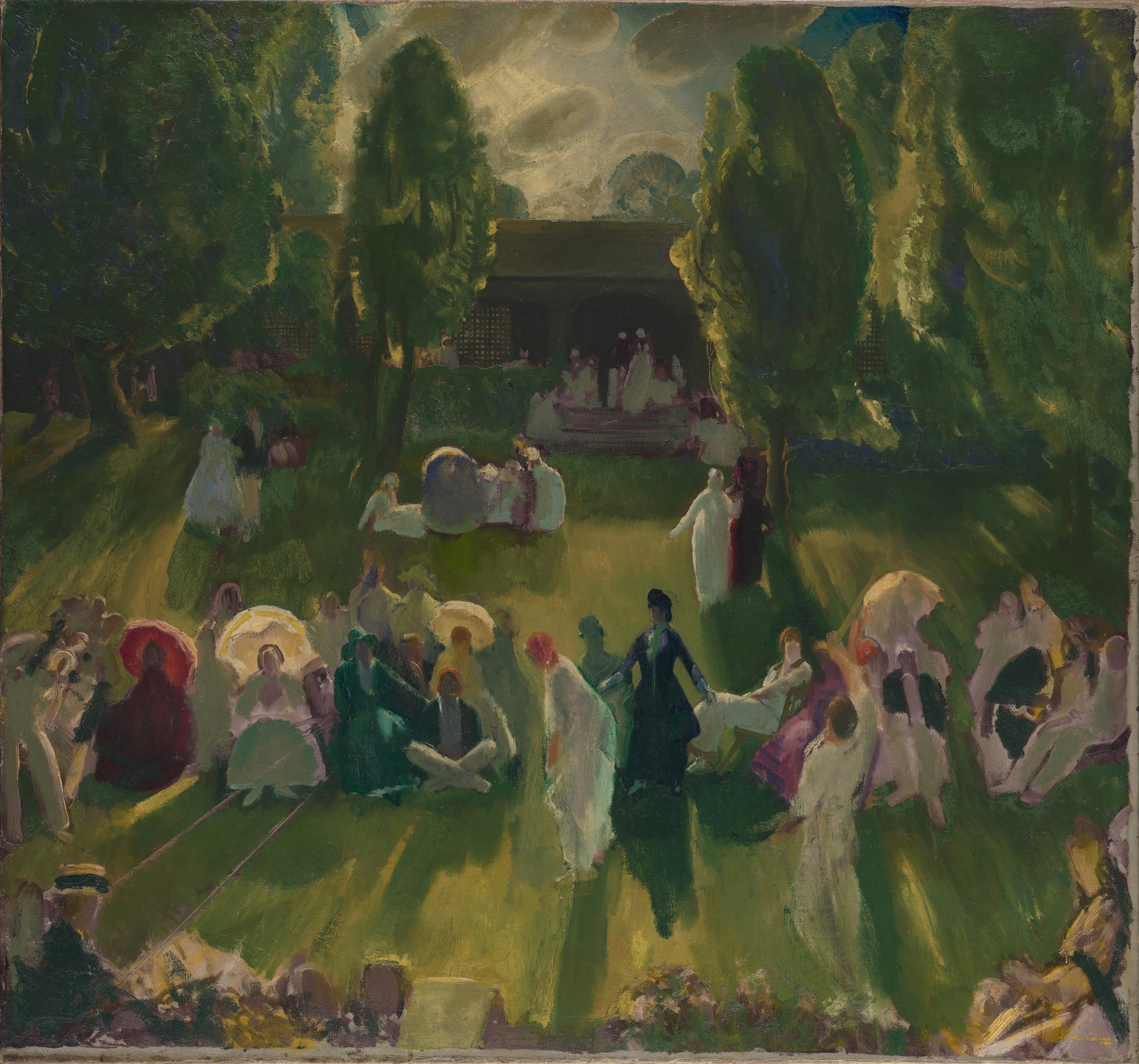
- Artist: George Bellows
- Year: 1919
- Medium: Oil on canvas
- Dimensions: 101.6 cm × 109.9 cm (40.0 in × 43.3 in)
- Location: The Met; New York City

Tennis at Newport is an oil-on-canvas painting of 1919 by the American artist George Bellows. It depicts one of the earliest editions of the Newport Casino Invitational, a major event on the high society calendar. The painting is in the Metropolitan Museum of Art.

== See also ==
- List of works by George Wesley Bellows
