= Stag at Sharkey's =

Painting by George Bellows

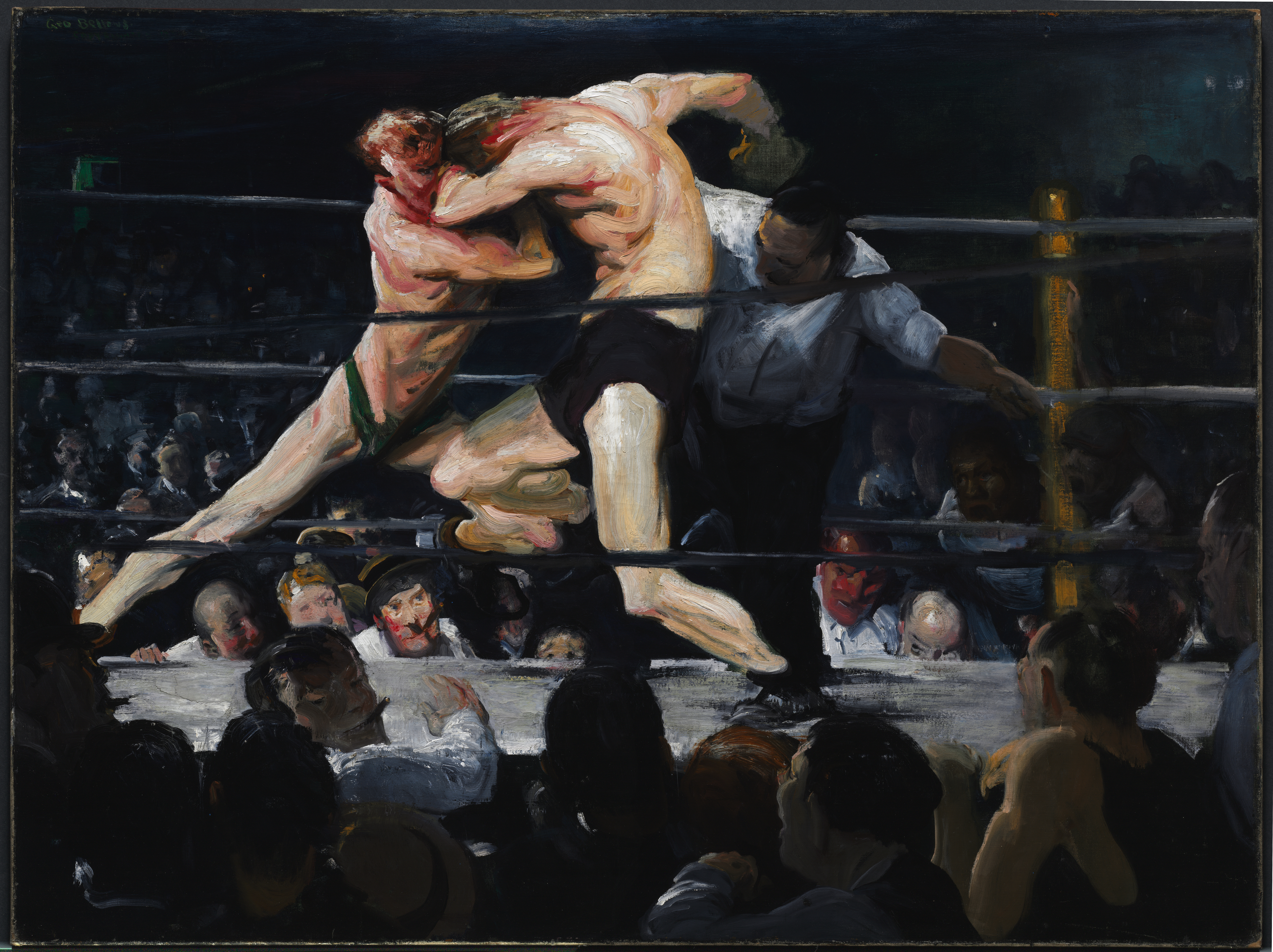
- Artist: George Wesley Bellows
- Year: 1909
- Medium: oil on canvas
- Dimensions: 92 cm × 122.6 cm (36.25 in × 48.25 in)
- Location: Cleveland Museum of Art; Cleveland

Stag at Sharkey's is a 1909 oil painting by the American artist George Wesley Bellows depicting two boxers fighting in the private athletic club situated across from his studio. It is part of the Ashcan School movement known in particular for depicting scenes of daily life in early twentieth century New York City, often in the city's poorer neighborhoods. Participants in the boxing ring were usually members of the club, but occasionally outsiders would fight with temporary memberships. These fighters were known as "stags".

== Description ==
Bellows used quick strokes to create a blurred image, simulating the two fighters in motion. He also chose a low point of view to situate the viewer among the crowd watching the fight, creating a sense of "expressive involvement" in the action. He said: "I don't know anything about boxing, I'm just painting two men trying to kill each other."

== History ==
He painted the work in August 1909, as a part of a boxing series. The painting has been a part of the Cleveland Museum of Art's permanent collection since 1922. He also created a lithograph of the scene, in 1917. Ninety-nine examples of this lithograph were printed. One example of this lithograph is located at the Detroit Institute of Arts.

== See also ==
- List of works by George Wesley Bellows
