= Dempsey and Firpo =

Painting by George Bellows

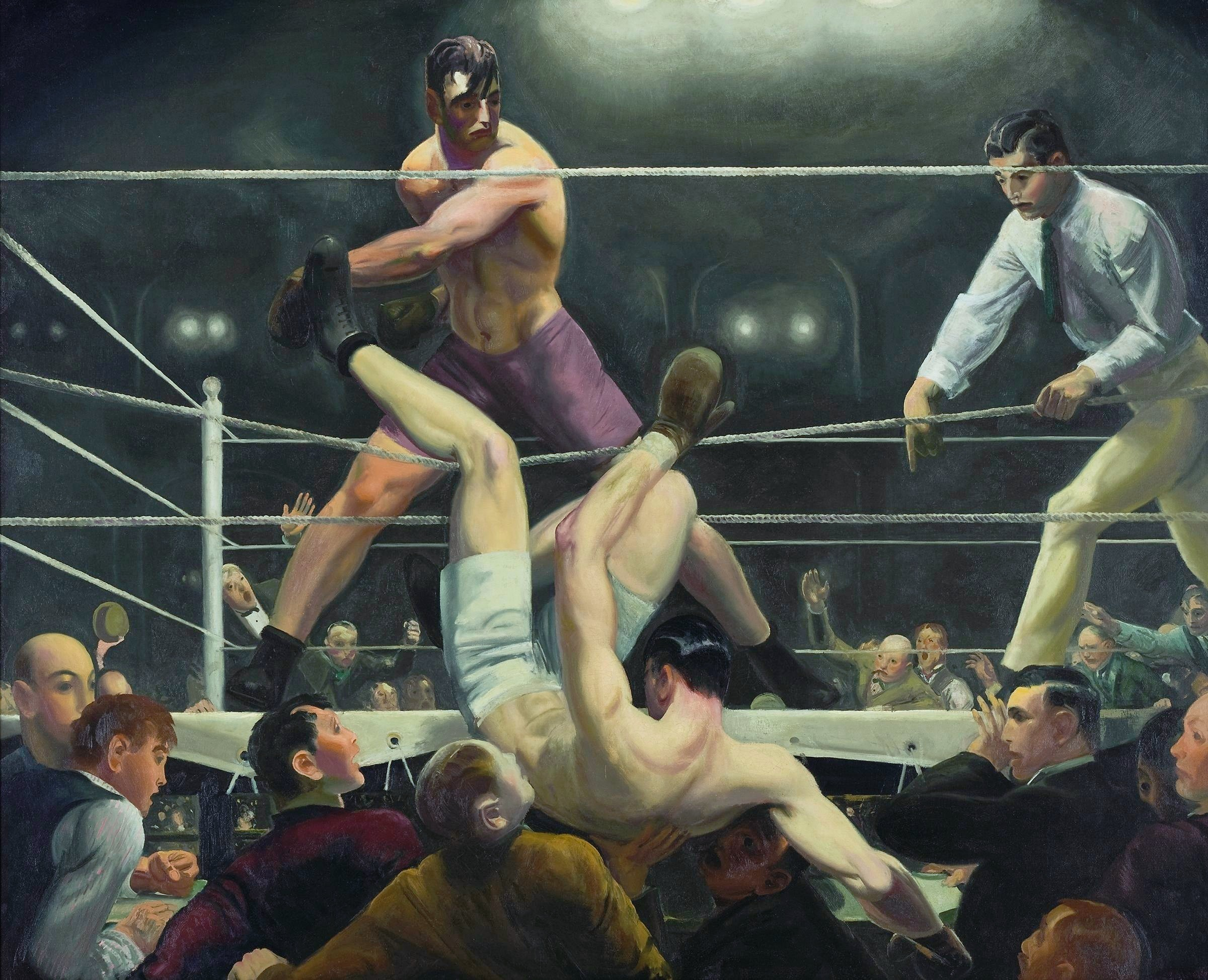
George Bellows, Dempsey and Firpo (1924), Whitney Museum of American Art

Dempsey and Firpo (sometimes referred to as Dempsey Through The Ropes) is an oil-on-canvas painting executed in 1923–1924 by the American artist George Bellows. It depicts the September 14, 1923, boxing match between American Jack Dempsey and Argentine Luis Firpo. It has become Bellows' most famous boxing painting. The work has been in the collection of the Whitney Museum of Art since the museum's opening in 1931.

== The painting ==
The painting depicts the dramatic moment when Firpo knocked Dempsey out of the ring, despite the fact that Dempsey was the eventual winner that night. Bellows gave himself a cameo as the balding man at the extreme left of the picture.

The style of the painting combines the proletarian subject matter and realism of the Ashcan School with a geometrically calculated composition that reveals Bellows's application of the principles of dynamic symmetry.

== In popular culture ==
In the 1976 movie Rocky a reproduction of the painting can be seen in Rocky's apartment.

The painting is referenced in The Simpsons episode "The Homer They Fall" during a montage of Homer Simpson winning boxing matches, where he and Moe Syzlak taking the poses of respectively Firpo and the referees.

The painting can be seen in the 1990 film Goodfellas, where it is visible behind Jimmy Conway on the wall of Neirs Tavern during Tommy DeVito's recount of a mob hit, the scene before Maury is "whacked". With some calling it "the most influential sports painting ever."

Artist Eric Joyner reinterpreted the painting portraying two robots fighting in a painting called "The final blow". This version can be seen as a decoration in the setting of the TV series The Big Bang Theory.

The New Yorker cover for the February 7, 2022, issue recasts the fighters as hockey players.

== See also ==
- List of works by George Wesley Bellows
