= Both Members of This Club =

Painting by George Bellows

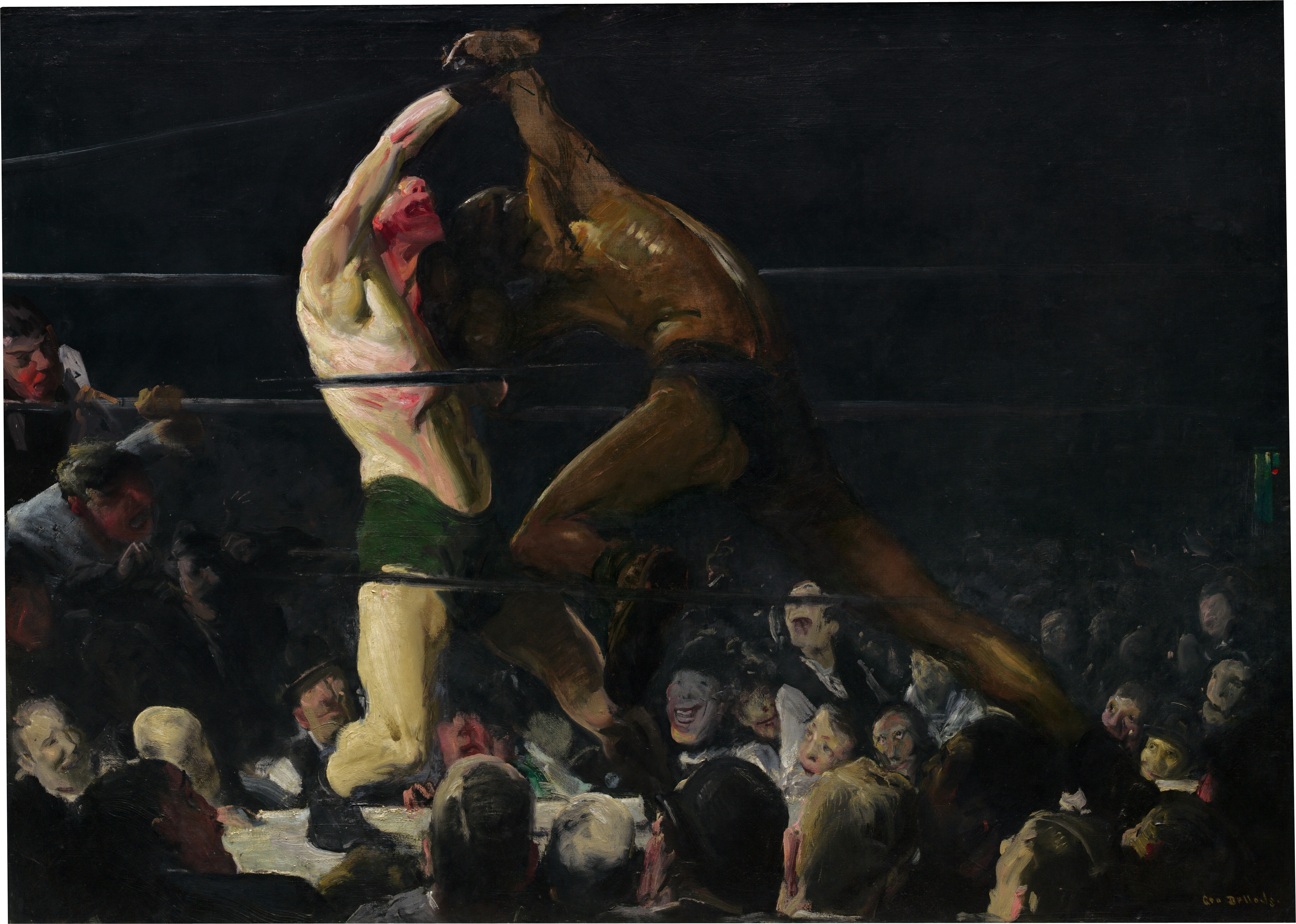
- Artist: George Bellows
- Year: 1909
- Medium: oil paint, canvas
- Dimensions: 115 cm (45 in) × 160.5 cm (63.2 in)
- Location: National Gallery of Art
- Accession: 1944.13.1

Both Members of This Club is an oil painting on canvas by the American artist George Bellows. It hangs in the National Gallery of Art, in Washington DC. It dates to 1909 and measures 115 cm × 160.5 cm (45 1/4 in × 63 3/16 in).

The Gallery writes, Both Members of This Club was inspired by the fights Bellows attended at Tom Sharkey's Athletic Club in New York. At the time, public boxing matches were illegal in the city. Private organizations like Sharkey's made prospective fighters temporary members of the "club" on the night of the event to circumvent the law."

Bellows painted the work in October 1909, as a follow on to Stag at Sharkey's.

== See also ==
- List of works by George Wesley Bellows
