= Cliff Dwellers (painting) =

Painting by George Bellows

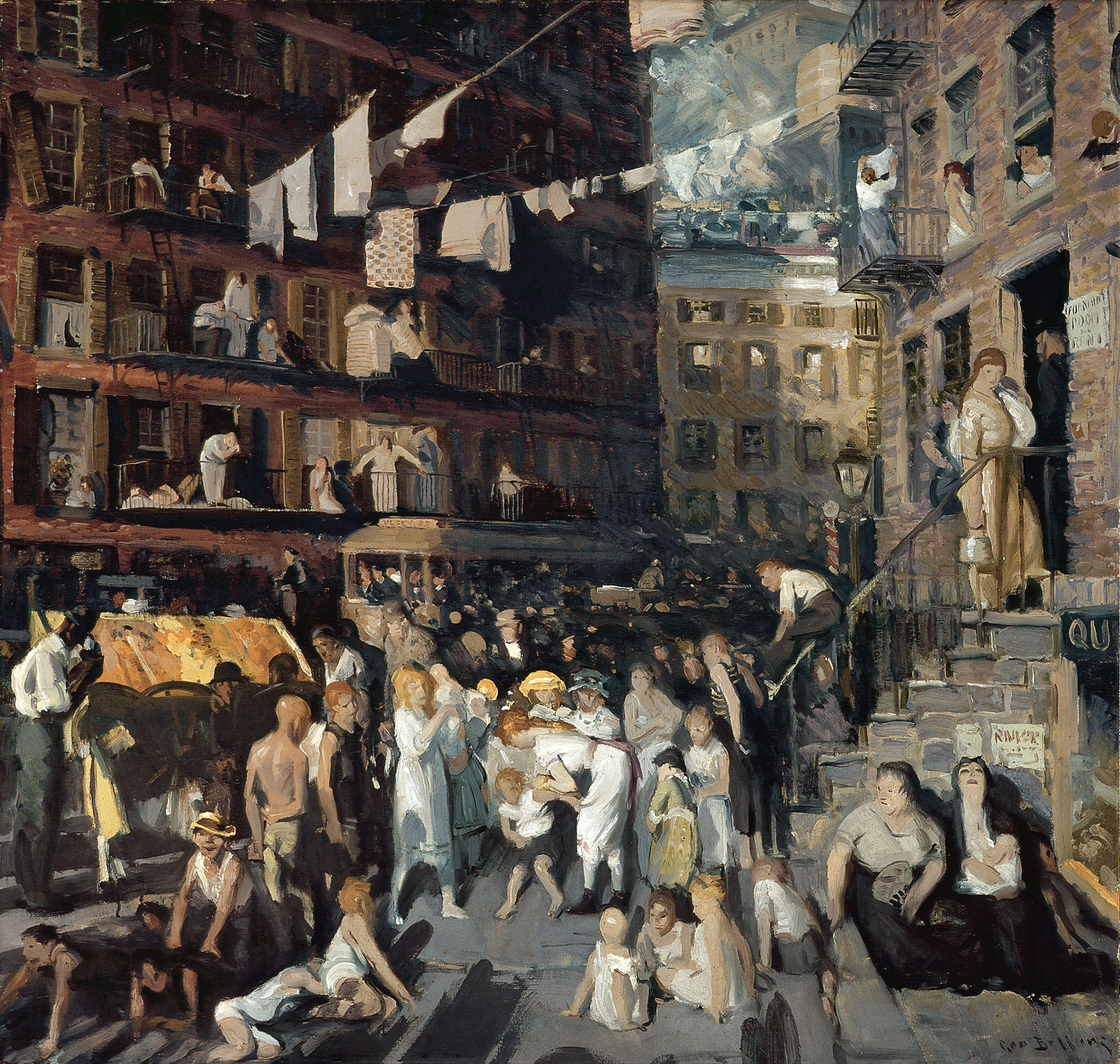
Cliff Dwellers (1913), oil on canvas by George Bellows

Cliff Dwellers (1913) is an oil-on-canvas painting by George Bellows that depicts a colorful crowd on New York City's Lower East Side, on what appears to be a hot summer day. Its dimensions are 40 1/4 by 42 1/8 inches (102 cm × 107 cm), and it is in the collection of the Los Angeles County Museum of Art, which acquired it in 1916.

The painting is a representative example of the Ashcan School, a movement in early-20th-century American art that favored the realistic depiction of gritty urban subjects. In Cliff Dwellers, people spill out of tenement buildings onto the streets, stoops, and fire escapes. Laundry flaps overhead and a street vendor hawks his goods from his pushcart in the midst of all the traffic. In the background, a trolley car heads toward Vesey Street.

== Formal analysis ==
The work was painted using a color system promoted by Hardesty Gillmore Maratta, a paint manufacturer and color theorist. Maratta marketed oil paints in a range of colors produced by mixing primary colors in precise ratios; each color was given the value of a particular musical note, and artists were advised to use the colors in ways that would produce harmonious intervals and chords. Bellows had begun using the system sometime in 1909 or 1910. According to art historian Michael Quick, Cliff Dwellers was

his most complex exploration of the Maratta color system. It contained three chords: orange, red-purple, and green-blue; blue-purple, green, and red-orange; and yellow-green, red, and blue ... But Bellows used the colors of each individual chord together in separate areas of the painting: the first chord in the foreground, the second primarily in the background building ... and the third in the red-brick buildings to the left and right...

== Historical context ==
The painting, made in 1913, suggests the new face of New York. Between 1870 and 1915, the city's population grew from one-and-a-half to five million, largely due to immigration. Many of the new arrivals—Italian, Jewish, Irish, and Chinese—crowded into tenement houses on the Lower East Side—the area north of the Brooklyn Bridge, south of Houston Street, and east of the Bowery. Among them were thousands of Eastern European Jews, who found temporary or permanent shelter along streets such as East Broadway, the setting for Cliff Dwellers. The city had never seen this kind of density before.

Within the context of Cliff Dwellers the audience is able to convey a sense of congestion, overpopulation and (primarily seen in the foreground) the impact of the city among the youth. Within the book The Paintings of George Bellows, a historical account of how adamant "urban reformers" were during the early twentieth century as thousands of immigrants migrated to neighborhoods of New York. "The children in Bellows's Cliff Dwellers, innocent as they appear, exhibited no effects of the requisite "Americanizing" process urban reformers considered crucial to the maintenance of social order."

Paired with the scrutiny heaped upon immigrants was that they were made to live in conditions which were made unbearable by the toll of industrialization within these areas. Small and dense were the living quarters of many who worked in similar environments in factories. The dense, dark character of the painting conveys a sense of how industrialization has impacted the working class lifestyle.

New York Realists were called by critics as the "revolutionary black gang" and the "apostles of ugliness". A critic, referring to their depictions also conferred them the pejorative label Ashcan School which became the standard term for this first important American art movement of the 20th century.

== See also ==
- List of works by George Wesley Bellows
- Tenement Flats (1934) by Millard Sheets
