= Vaid (surname) =

Vaid is a surname of Indian origin. It is found among several communities, including Oswals, Mohyals, and Parsis. Vaid or Ved is a sanskrit word used for practitioner (Vaidya) of Ayurveda medicine.

Notable people with the surname include:

- Sahil Vaid (born 1986), Indian actor
- Aryan Vaid (born 1971), Indian model
- Bakshi Tirath Ram Vaid (1857–1924), British Indian Army officer
- Dawood Vaid, Indian educator
- Jyotsna Vaid, Indian-American psychologist
- Krishna Baldev Vaid, Hindi writer
- Madan Lal Vaid, British Indian Army officer
- Marcel Vaid, Indo-Swiss film composer
- Nakul Vaid, Indian film actor
- Shesh Paul Vaid (born 1959), Indian police officer
- Urvashi Vaid (1958–2022), Indian-American activist and writer
- Bakshi Anand Prakash Vaid (1930–2002), Indian poet and lyricist
