= Virtually Normal =

1995 book by Andrew Sullivan

Virtually Normal: An Argument About Homosexuality
- Cover of the first edition
- Author: Andrew Sullivan
- Cover artist: Chip Kidd
- Language: English
- Subject: LGBT rights in the United States
- Publisher: Alfred A. Knopf (United States); Random House (Canada); Picador (United Kingdom)
- Publication date: 1995
- Publication place: United States
- Media type: Print (Hardcover and Paperback)
- Pages: 209 (first edition); 225 (second edition)
- ISBN: 0-330-34696-2

Virtually Normal: An Argument About Homosexuality (1995; second edition 1996) is a book about the politics of homosexuality by the political commentator Andrew Sullivan, in which the author criticizes four different perspectives on gay rights in American society, which he calls the "Prohibitionist", "Liberationist", "Conservative", and "Liberal" views, seeking to expose internal inconsistencies within each of them. He also criticizes the philosopher Michel Foucault and gay rights activists he considers influenced by Foucault, and argues in favor of same-sex marriage and an end to the don't ask, don't tell policy, which banned service by openly gay people in the US military. However, he makes a case against legislation aimed at preventing private discrimination against gay people.

The book was compared to the gay rights activist Urvashi Vaid's Virtual Equality (1995), and received many positive reviews, praising it as well-written work on its topic. Virtually Normal has been seen as an important intellectual work on homosexuality and a significant contribution to public debate over same-sex marriage. Some reviewers credited Sullivan with exposing American liberalism's abandonment of its own fundamental principles. However, the book was controversial. Sullivan was criticized for being too sympathetic to the "Prohibitionist" view, for opposing anti-discrimination laws, and for supporting gay rights by arguing that being homosexual is not a choice, as well as for his account of Foucault's ideas and social constructionism, his treatment of natural law, his reliance on the work of the historian John Boswell in his discussion of biblical passages relating to homosexuality, and for blaming the sexual promiscuity of gay men on social disapproval of homosexuality. Several reviewers suggested that Sullivan advocated infidelity within marriage.

== Summary ==
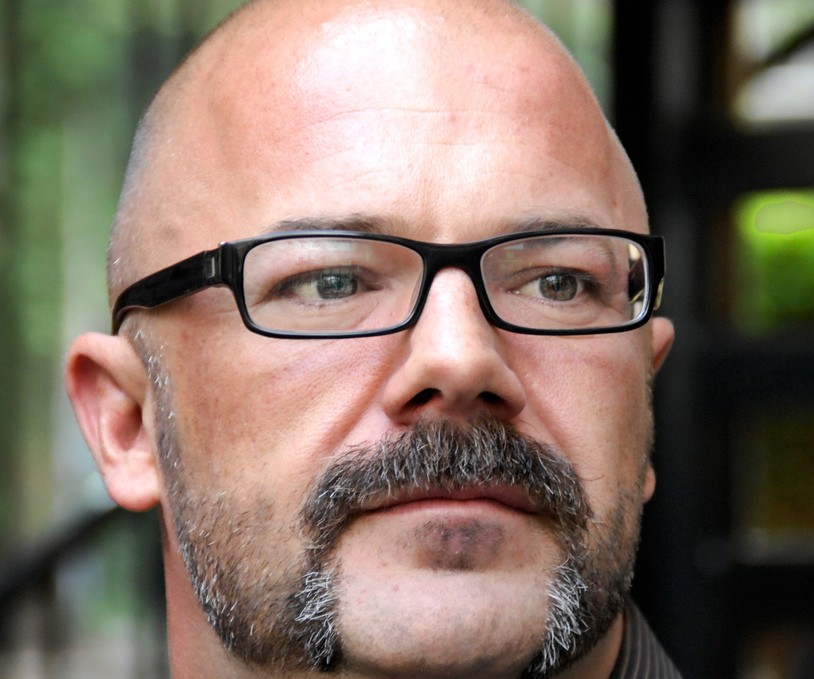
Andrew Sullivan

Sullivan presents the reader with four groups of types of people who view homosexuality in a specific manner within American society, criticizing the different arguments: Prohibitionists, Liberationists, Conservatives, and Liberals.

The Prohibitionists comprise strict followers of the Bible and Quran. They believe that "homosexuality is an aberration, homosexual acts are an abomination," homosexuality is an illness that requires a cure, and that homosexual acts should be punished. Sullivan argues that there is inconsistency with Prohibitionists who use Biblical and moral arguments against homosexuality, yet not against other conditions many Christians find sexually immoral. In order for Prohibitionists to have effective policy, they have to be hypocritical in their denial of marriage to same-sex couples, yet not to infertile heterosexual couples (because they claim marriage's sole purpose is procreation). However, if the Prohibitionists are consistent, then their views are too marginal to be accepted by society at large. In his discussion of the Prohibitionist view, Sullivan also draws on the work of the historian John Boswell to argue that biblical passages dealing with homosexuality, such as those by Saint Paul, may have been mistranslated. He also outlines and criticizes the ideas of Thomas Aquinas, evaluates the significance of the pastoral letter On the Pastoral Care of Homosexual Persons (1986), arguing that it represented an important shift in the Catholic Church's position toward gay people, and discusses the views of Cardinal Ratzinger.

The Liberationists are epitomised by Queer Nation. Like the Prohibitionists, they believe that no one is "homosexual", but they hold this belief for a different reason. To a Liberationist, words such as "homosexual", "homosexuality", "gay", and "lesbian" are simply tools that the straight majority use to oppress the gay and lesbian minority. An example of this would be that a gay man who feels sexual attraction for a particular woman would be limited by the chains of his "sexual orientation". Sullivan claims their flaw to be that liberationist policy, by rejecting the notion of limiting oneself to words, fails to improve the plight of the gay and lesbian community. Sullivan identifies the philosopher Michel Foucault as "arguably the most significant influence on liberationist thinkers and politics," and criticizes his views as expressed in The History of Sexuality (1976–1984).

Conservatives, unlike the Prohibitionists, do not believe that everyone is essentially heterosexual. They acknowledge the existence of a non-heterosexual minority. However, they believe that homosexuality should be only a private matter and kept silent in public matters. They further believe that homosexuals should not seek to change public acceptance of homosexuality because social change will come with time, just as it has for other minorities. Sullivan says that the problem of the Conservatives is that as gays and lesbians gain increasing acceptance in Western societies, they are faced with two alternatives. The first is a path of "increasing isolation and uncomfortable hostility to homosexuality". The second is to incorporate homosexual trends into their conservatism, as those originally opposed to women's suffrage eventually accepted the notion of women contributing to the conservative tradition of democracy.

The Liberals seek to apply liberalism as has been applied to other minorities to the gay community. Sullivan argues that the liberals want to apply a cookie-cutter agenda of "liberalism" that would render many gays as permanent victims of civil rights abuse. He says that the liberals are guilty of "trying to use easy remedies for a problem that knows no easy remedies; using the language of rights in an area where it is impossible to avoid the language of goods; encouraging an attitude among homosexuals that might actually increase their isolation rather than undermine it". They are said to limit the freedom of the majority to give rights to minorities. Sullivan also adds that anti-discrimination laws are reifying. Sullivan argues in favor of same-sex marriage, maintaining that it would have both a humanising and traditionalising effort. He also advocates the repeal of don't ask, don't tell.

== Publication history ==
Virtually Normal was first published in 1995 by Alfred A. Knopf in the United States, Random House in Canada, and Picador in the United Kingdom. A revised edition with a new afterword by Sullivan was published by Picador in 1996.

== Reception ==
=== Overview of media reception ===
Virtually Normal received positive reviews from Ray Olson in Booklist, the critic Denis Donoghue in The New York Times Book Review, the journalist E. J. Dionne in The Washington Post, the philosopher Harvey Mansfield in The Wall Street Journal, Jeffrey Ingram in Library Journal, the journalist Richard Bernstein in The New York Times, the critic Camille Paglia in The Washington Post, the journalist Chandler Burr in Washington Monthly, the journalist Christopher Hitchens in The Times Literary Supplement, Walter Olson in Reason, Publishers Weekly, The Economist, The Virginia Quarterly Review, and in Commonweal from Margaret O'Brie Steinfels and Paul Baumann. In National Review, Virtually Normal received a positive review from the political theorist Kenneth Minogue and later a mixed evaluation from Justin Katz.

The book received mixed reviews from Marc Peyser in Newsweek, the publisher Anthony Blond in The Spectator, Tom Gliatto in People, Tim Stafford in Christianity Today, the novelist and critic Adam Mars-Jones in the London Review of Books, Elizabeth Kristol in First Things, the political scientist James Q. Wilson in Commentary, the philosopher Kwame Anthony Appiah in The New York Review of Books, and The Wilson Quarterly. The book received negative reviews from the philosopher Alan Ryan in The New Yorker, the journalist Richard Goldstein in The Village Voice, Scott Walker in The American Enterprise, ACT UP member Scott Tucker in The Humanist, and the journalist Charles Krauthammer in Time. According to Sullivan, reviews also appeared in The Tablet, the Financial Times, The Independent, Elle, and the "religious right publication" Lambda Report. Sullivan was interviewed about the book in New Statesman and Society.

=== Positive media reviews ===
Ray Olson credited Sullivan with explaining controversies over homosexuality in American politics. He described Virtually Normal as skillfully argued and carefully written, and "the best book ever on gay politics." Donoghue credited Sullivan with arguing with "force and cogency". However, he described his view of marriage as "sentimental", arguing that marriage was not primarily about recognizing an emotional commitment between two people. He also questioned his characterizations of homosexuals. Dionne commended the book as a useful and fair discussion of the politics of homosexuality. He found Sullivan's discussions of the "conservative" and "liberal" views insightful, and credited Sullivan with helping to "advance civility, decency and mutual respect". However, he had reservations about Sullivan's case for same-sex marriage. Mansfield described the book as "excellent" and credited Sullivan with setting "a standard for depth and subtlety of argument that has not been reached before on either side of the debate." Ingram considered the book important, describing it as "a level-headed, clearly argued discussion of gay rights, the homosexual, and society." He described Sullivan's position on gay rights as "at once old-fashioned and highly original", and wrote that, "Sullivan's approach satisfies the concerns of conservatives and liberals alike, although his old-fashioned definition of laissez-faire liberalism will rile most liberals, and his most radical suggestion, legal recognition of gay marriages, will certainly flutter conservatives' tail feathers."

Bernstein described the book as a "a sober, reasoned reflection" on gay rights, and predicted that "few people are likely to remain entirely unmoved by at least some of his arguments or to feel exactly the same about homosexuality after reading his book as they did before." He praised Sullivan for reasoning calmly about a divisive subject, and credited Sullivan with the ability to help people who are not gay understand his experience, as well as with understanding the views of opponents of gay rights. He agreed with Sullivan that there should be "freedom to disapprove of homosexuality and to decline to keep company with gay people". He predicted that some supporters of the gay rights movement would be dissatisfied with Virtually Normal. He described Sullivan's case for same-sex marriages as "powerful", but nevertheless was not fully convinced by it.

Paglia described the book as well-written and revealing of Sullivan's intellectual ability. She considered it well-timed, because it had been published at a moment when the "gay activist leadership" was in disarray, and wrote that it established Sullivan as one of the most politically sophisticated gay writers. However, she criticized Sullivan's reticence about his private life, and for attributing the sexual promiscuity of gay men to social prejudice, arguing that this explanation is contradicted by the different behavior of lesbians. She maintained that while his account of the varying views of homosexuality to some extent obscured political reality, it nevertheless had the merit of broadening political debate, and thus marked a major contribution to public dialogue. She criticized Sullivan's treatment of the biblical background of the "Prohibitionist" view, his discussion of official Catholic statements on homosexuality, and for ignoring the hostility to homosexuality in religions other than Christianity. Though endorsing Sullivan's criticisms of Foucault and his form of social constructionism, she criticized Sullivan for focusing too much on Foucault in his discussion of the "Liberationist" view. She praised Sullivan's attacks on ACT UP, queer theory, "liberalism's abandonment of its first principles", and "victim-oriented anti-discrimination laws". She wrote that despite Sullivan's assertions, homosexuality is neither "universal" nor "a constant throughout all cultures and times". Nevertheless, she considered Virtually Normal "brilliant and revolutionary" and predicted that it would "transform gay studies".

Burr called the book "meticulously argued", and credited Sullivan with providing "most practical prescription for better integrating the gay community into the society at large" and writing "an intellectual book about a controversial topic in an engaging style". He suggested that because Sullivan was gay, he brought "an intimacy to his topic that few books of equal intellectual ambition have." He considered Sullivan's discussion of conservative views of gay people especially relevant given the "political climate" as of 1995. He endorsed Sullivan's arguments against the "Prohibitionists" and "Liberationists", although he considered Sullivan's case against outing irrelevant to the rest of Virtually Normal.

Hitchens described the book as "subtle and seductive", praised its autobiographical aspects, and credited Sullivan with changing the way homosexuality is debated in the United States. He was impressed by Sullivan's criticism of the "Liberationist" view, but suggested that Sullivan's religious convictions had led him to give more space to the arguments of Cardinal Ratzinger than they deserved. Walter Olson wrote that readers of the book should "skip past the sex stuff to get to the policy discussion". He praised the way in which Sullivan argued against laws banning discrimination against gay people, and agreed with Sullivan that such laws had done very little to increase tolerance and in practice acted to limit individual liberty. He endorsed Sullivan's view that the government should move to a "position of neutrality between gay and straight citizens". While he found Virtually Normal to be "short on research and on consideration of practical details", he considered this an inevitable limitation for a work of its kind. He concluded that the book was an important discussion of the politics of homosexuality, though he noted that authors such as the critic Bruce Bawer and the journalist Jonathan Rauch had already expressed similar views.

Publishers Weekly described the book as a "lucid polemic". The Economist credited Sullivan with making a reasonable case for gay rights, and with convincingly criticizing each of the four perspectives on homosexuality he discussed. The Virginia Quarterly Review described the book as "lucid" and "engaging", crediting Sullivan with carefully criticizing the four perspectives on homosexuality he discussed.

Steinfels praised the "intelligence and vigor" with which Sullivan engaged with the arguments about homosexuality, and saw part of his achievement as being "coherently rendering each of these four positions with their best, not their weakest, arguments". She described Sullivan's discussion of his own homosexuality as "unpretentious but honest", and welcomed the "generous regard" with which he treated On the Pastoral Care of Homosexual Persons, despite his disagreement with its position that homosexuality is an "objective disorder". However, she noted that the views Sullivan described as "conservative" would also characterize many American liberals, and that the views he described as "prohibitionist" would be held mainly by American conservatives. She also predicted that those who read the Bible literally would not be convinced by Sullivan's scriptural exegesis, and criticized Sullivan's treatment of the issues of military service by gay people and same-sex marriage, writing that he failed to "distinguish the very different political and moral provenance of the two issues." She was not fully convinced by Sullivan's case for same-sex marriage, and argued that there might be a better case for domestic partnerships.

Baumann described the book as "required reading" for anyone interested in politics. He credited Sullivan with the ability to "change minds" about the issue of homosexuality, and praised him for the "graciousness" with which he engaged others, as well as for his exegesis of what Baumann considered the Catholic Church's "muddled" teachings on homosexuality. However, he questioned whether it was possible for the liberal state to remain neutral, as Sullivan proposed it should.

=== Reception in National Review ===
Minogue wrote that Sullivan had "done for homosexuality what John Stuart Mill did for freedom", crediting him with fairly presenting the range of social opinion on the subject, and suggested that only those familiar with the history of political philosophy would "recognize the scale of his achievement." He described Virtually Normal as "moving" and subtle. However, while describing Sullivan's arguments as apparently persuasive, he expressed misgivings about Sullivan's case for open military service by gay people and same-sex marriage. He also argued that society had to be concerned about the fate of "waverers", people who might become either homosexual or heterosexual.

Katz described Virtually Normal as "Sullivan's unique perspective presented as a political argument." He considered the book "brilliant" as a "polemical feat", in that it transformed "the terms of the debate" and provided "a solid platform from which to volley objections." However, he considered Sullivan's assessment of his opponents thinking flawed, especially when it came to dealing with religious opposition to homosexual behavior. He argued that Sullivan speculated about the intentions behind Paul's comments about homosexuality in the Epistle to the Romans without any corroboration from the text of the Bible. He likened Sullivan's arguments to an attempt to score debating points, and described Sullivan's belief in "public neutrality and private difference" as a "dogma" that was difficult to apply in practice due to Sullivan's central concern with marriage, which he described as "exactly where the private becomes public." He criticized Sullivan for challenging the idea that it is better for people to become heterosexual than homosexual.

=== Mixed media reviews ===
Peyser wrote that the book was "packed with the kinds of contortions you'd expect from someone straddling so many cultural fences" and contained "numbing dialectics and 25-cent words". He described Sullivan's views, including his support for same-sex marriage and military service by openly gay people, as well as his opposition to legislation banning discrimination in the private sector, as "incendiary". He considered Sullivan's praise for gay men's understanding of the need for "extramarital outlets" as an effective endorsement of adultery. However, he granted that Virtually Normal contained much material to stimulate debate over the issue of gay rights. Blond described the book as a "formidable little tract." However, he suggested that Sullivan attached too much importance to marriage. Gliatto described the autobiographical material in the book as moving, but found Sullivan's arguments about the main political viewpoints on gay rights, while rigorous, to be also "self-absorbedly quaint". He considered the book mostly well-written. In his opinion, Sullivan's case for same-sex marriage was made with such "heartfelt directness and yearning" that it made the rest of the book appear unnecessary.

Stafford welcomed the fact that Sullivan recognized "communal interests", but nevertheless criticized Sullivan for arguing about the issue of gay rights from "within strict categories of his own invention". He considered Sullivan "brilliant at many points", especially in describing how "liberals have found themselves at odds with their own principles". He credited Sullivan with skill at "explaining the difficulty of the homosexual's position" and with providing an eloquent description of homosexuals' desire for lasting intimacy. He found Sullivan to be at his weakest when it came to discussing views hostile to homosexuality. He questioned Sullivan's identification of the "Prohibitionist" view with the Catholic Church and Christian fundamentalism, writing that to his knowledge the Catholic Church did not support laws that would "prosecute homosexuals", and that only a minority of fundamentalists would support an effort to eliminate homosexuality through punishment and incarceration. He considered Sullivan out of his depth in discussing the "biblical understanding of homosexuality", and criticized his uncritical reliance on Boswell. He was unconvinced by Sullivan's claim that homosexuals have existed at all times and places, and criticized Sullivan's case for same-sex marriage, arguing that "exclusive and lifelong" sexual relationships between homosexuals were virtually non-existent. He criticized Sullivan for advocating recognition of the "need for extramarital outlets", which in his view amounted to endorsing adultery and showed that Sullivan had little understanding of marriage.

Mars-Jones wrote that Sullivan is "more interesting in his contradictions than his attempts to resolve them". He credited Sullivan with offering lucid discussions of the conservative and liberal views of homosexuality, but found Sullivan's discussion of the "Prohibitionist" view overly sympathetic and his discussion of the "Liberationist" view misleading. He argued that Sullivan wrongly equated the "Liberationist" view with social constructionism and Foucault's ideas, and accused Sullivan of caricaturing social constructionism. He rejected comparisons between Virtually Normal and the feminist writer Germaine Greer's The Female Eunuch (1970).

Kristol wrote that Sullivan offered a moving case for same-sex marriage as well as a "poignant memoir" of growing up gay, and that Virtually Normal should be of special interest to conservatives. However, she believed that Sullivan's view that social disapproval of homosexuality is responsible for gay men's sexual promiscuity is contradicted by the different behavior of lesbians. She accused Sullivan of presenting a sanitized picture of gay life, and argued that he undermined his own case for same-sex marriage by supporting "understanding of the need for extramarital outlets". She argued that while same-sex marriage would make it easier for young gay people to accept themselves, it might also cause sexual confusion for children and harm society, and that Sullivan ignored the possible harmful effects of same-sex parenting on children. She suggested that legalizing same-sex marriage would be likely to increase the number of people who became gay and weaken marriage as an institution. She described Sullivan's view that sexual orientation is determined by early childhood as debatable. She concluded that Virtually Normal is not fundamentally about politics or ideas but about "emotions".

Wilson described the book as important and well-written, writing that Sullivan made a strong case for his views, and had provided "the most sensible and coherent view of a program to put homosexuals and heterosexuals on the same public footing." However, he did not believe that Sullivan's proposals would end attempts to change private behavior toward gay people, which in Wilson's view would inevitably lead to "the political imposition of tolerance". He was unconvinced by Sullivan's discussion of biblical passages dealing with homosexuality, and with Sullivan's criticism of the "Prohibitionist" viewpoint in general, as well as by Sullivan's discussion of the "Conservative" viewpoint and his treatment of natural law arguments against homosexuality. He argued against Sullivan's case for same-sex marriage, writing that it was based on the untested assumptions that "marriage would have the same, domesticating, effect on homosexual members as it has on heterosexuals, while leaving the latter largely unaffected." He argued that opposition to same-sex marriage is not irrational, and criticized Sullivan's support for an "understanding of the need for extramarital outlets" within same-sex marriages.

Appiah described the book as "elegant" and endorsed Sullivan's arguments against the "Prohibitionist" and "Conservative" views. However, he accused Sullivan of misreading Foucault in his discussion of the "Liberationist" view and rejected Sullivan's view that Foucault is central to its politics. Although agreeing with Sullivan's criticism of groups such as ACT UP and Queer Nation, he found Sullivan's arguments against Foucault to have no relevance to them. He criticized Sullivan's discussion of "Liberalism", arguing that Sullivan wrongly assumed that "political creeds can be identified with clear principles clearly articulated with respect to one another and embodied in settled understandings of the proper conduct of politics", failed to see that modern American liberals are "not defined by a single, articulate political creed", presented an "eccentric" account of the history of liberalism, and a distorted account of anti-discrimination legislation and affirmative action, and also failed to understand the significance of the distinction between public and private. He wrote that while Sullivan wrongly want the government to have no involvement with the economy; he also disagreed with Sullivan's case against anti-discrimination laws. In his view, Sullivan's skepticism about modern liberalism should have led him to oppose state recognition of marriage rather than argue for state recognition of same-sex marriages.

The Wilson Quarterly wrote that Virtually Normal was "Unimpeded by statistics and footnotes", and "has the pressing, insistent tone of serious conversation." It considered Sullivan's division of political opinion about homosexuality somewhat artificial, but praised Sullivan for being "Alert to the need for nuance and qualification".

=== Negative media reviews ===
Ryan considered the autobiographical elements of the book "touching". He agreed with parts of Sullivan's discussion of "Prohibitionism", but faulted Sullivan's discussion of the "liberal" perspective on homosexuality, arguing that Sullivan had an oversimplified view of the distinction between the public and the private, and his discussion of "Liberationism", arguing that it placed a mistaken emphasis on Foucault. He agreed with Sullivan's case for gay military service, but believed that Virtually Normal would not permanently alter how people thought about homosexuality, describing its "history, sociology, psychology, and political theory" as "perfunctory" and its "philosophy" as "thin". Goldstein believed that the book had received media attention partly due to Sullivan's role as editor of The New Republic and partly due to his criticism of conventional gay politics. He considered the book well-written, but believed that Sullivan was biased by his personal experiences and failed to give sufficient attention to lesbians. He accused him of providing misleading interpretations of Vatican statements on homosexuality and of being insufficiently critical of them, and of wrongly believing that his arguments could end hatred against homosexuals. He also criticized Sullivan's account of the various political positions on homosexuality, considering his categories inventions; he also argued that Sullivan misrepresented gay liberationists by presenting them as followers of Foucault. He criticized Sullivan for his opposition to anti-discrimination laws and suggested that his views could be used to undermine gay rights.

Walker described the book as "grandiloquent", and accused Sullivan of "elegant sophistry". He suggested that Sullivan's case for same-sex marriage would encourage adulterers, pedophiles, polygamists, and people interested in practicing bestiality. He criticized Sullivan for failing to disavow the pedophile organization NAMBLA, and described him as "childish" for suggesting that emotional and sexual desires must be satisfied. He wrote that Sullivan's "pleadings have no hope either of persuading the homosexually tempted to lead lives of greater restraint, or of eliminating the average American's disgust at homosexual practice". He suggested that instead of arguing for gay rights, Sullivan should have turned to a "merciful God Who reminds us that we are all sinners and that we will be judged on the charity, and truthfulness, we show our neighbors as they bear their crosses."

Tucker contrasted Virtually Normal with Vaid's Virtual Equality, noting that the books had sometimes been reviewed together. However, he stated that Virtual Equality had received fewer and more hostile works in the mainstream media. He criticized both works for failing to present "any thorough analysis of class conflicts." He wrote that the pages of Virtually Normal "fairly reek of class even when the subject is hidden". He suggested that the book had received favorable reviews in publications such as the New York Times Book Review partially because of their role in promoting conservative writers and policies, and Sullivan's position as editor of The New Republic. He criticized Sullivan for "genuflections before authority" such as trying to present the Catholic Church's condemnations of homosexuality in a favorable light, and for his opposition to anti-discrimination legislation.

Krauthammer argued that Sullivan failed to show that the reasoning that supports same-sex marriage would not also in principle support polygamy, and concluded that most Americans would continue to find same-sex marriage "psychologically or morally abhorrent", and prefer that their children be heterosexual rather than homosexual.

=== Reception in the gay community ===
Virtually Normal received a negative review from Michael Schwartz in the Harvard Gay & Lesbian Review and a mixed review from the historian Lillian Faderman in The Advocate. Sullivan states it was reviewed in Out. It was discussed by Stephen H. Miller in the New York Native and the social theorist Michael Warner in The Nation.

Schwartz argued that Sullivan's method of exposing logical inconsistencies in his opponents' views would not change their minds, and that some of the alleged inconsistencies in those views arose only because of how Sullivan chose to present them. He wrote that while Sullivan hoped that the Catholic Church would reconsider its position on homosexuality, the evidence Sullivan offered suggested that the Church was hardening its position. He found Sullivan's account of the "Liberationist" view misleading, describing Sullivan's discussion of Foucault's views as simplistic and his description of how "Liberationists" believed gay soldiers should behave as a falsification. He also criticized Sullivan's discussion of the "Conservative" view, questioning whether there were any conservatives who combine "a private tolerance of homosexuality" with public disapproval of it, and the "Liberal" view, arguing that despite Sullivan's claims, the support of liberals for anti-discrimination laws does not involve any contradiction. He maintained that the different behavior of lesbians contradicts Sullivan's suggestion that gay men's sexual promiscuity is the result of social disapproval of homosexuality. He criticized the idea that same-sex marriage should be promoted as a way of increasing social stability, or integrating gay people into society, arguing that this should not happen until society itself had been changed.

Faderman described Virtually Normal as an "impassioned, often brilliant, often obtuse" polemic for gay rights. She credited Sullivan with "astutely and wittily" discrediting the "Prohibitionist" view of homosexuality. However, she was not fully convinced by his attempt to show that Paul, in his apparent condemnations of homosexuality, was not criticizing the sexual behavior of "real homosexuals". She found his discussion of the "Liberationist" view misleading, writing that he wrongly depicted all "Liberationists" as supporters of outing and the use of the term queer to describe gay people. She also described him as an "essentialist", and criticized him for failing to provide "hard evidence" for his claim that homosexuality is involuntary for the overwhelming majority of gay people, and for proposing that achieving open military service and same-sex marriage should be the highest political priorities for gay people. She wrote that he mistakenly believed that homosexuality is innate, maintaining that many gay people chose to be homosexual. She criticized him for trying to support gay rights by arguing that gay people cannot help being homosexual. Warner suggested that Sullivan's message "plays well with a key constituency" of "middle-class white gay men", and accused Sullivan of being unaware that his "withered conception of the public and the private is pure regression to the nineteenth-century liberal tradition."

Other reactions from gay organizations and individuals included those of the Lesbian Avengers, who picketed Sullivan's book reading in Chicago, and the gay rights advocate Evan Wolfson, who believes that Sullivan, in Virtually Normal and some of his other writings, was "one of the earliest and most sustained intellectual advocates" for same-sex marriage, and that Sullivan's contributions were important. According to The Advocate, Virtually Normal became a best-seller among gay men and lesbians.

=== Scientific and academic journals ===
Virtually Normal received positive reviews from Malcolm Stuart Edwards in Theology & Sexuality and James J. Tarbox in Southern Communication Journal. The book received mixed reviews from Bradley P. Smith in Yale Law Journal, the political scientist Diana Schaub in The Public Interest, and the law professor Jane S. Schacter in Harvard Law Review. Morris B. Kaplan, writing with the philosopher Edward Stein, gave Virtually Normal a mixed review in Constellations, and, writing independently, a negative review in Political Theory. The book received negative reviews from the philosopher Richard D. Mohr and the historian John D'Emilio in the Journal of Homosexuality. It also received a negative review from Shane Phelan in the American Political Science Review.

Edwards described the book as a well-argued work. However, he argued that Sullivan's discussion of the "Prohibitionist" suffered from "interpretative shortcomings" similar to those of Boswell's work. He also believed that he mistakenly interpreted social constructionism as holding "that homosexuality is not an orientation but a form of life which is chosen", thus confusing "Foucault’s historical argument with the etiological question of nature and nurture." He also criticized him for using sexist language and for his commitment to a "liberal theory of the state" that marginalized religious ethics. Tarbox credited Sullivan with exposing "inherent contradictions and inconsistencies" within the perspectives on homosexuality he discussed. However, he considered Sullivan's objectives debatable, and that Sullivan sometimes used language that confused his discussion of the political arguments, and that his own arguments were sometimes lacking in supporting detail. Smith believed that Sullivan offered powerful arguments and "an exceptional job of reframing the homosexuality debate from a discussion of rights to a discussion of equality." However, he maintained that his case "rests on definitional assumptions that do not reflect legal reality." He criticized his opposition to anti-discrimination legislation. He questioned his reliance on the distinction between public and private, considering it "untenable". He noted that marriage introduces public rights into private relationships. He also suggested that, "Sullivan develops homosexual politics to label and rhetorically his opponents."

Schaub compared Sullivan's views on homosexuality to those expressed by Bawer in A Place at the Table (1993). She praised Sullivan's intellectual honesty, and agreed with his refusal to dismiss the "Prohibitionist" view of homosexuality as a form of "homophobia". However, she criticized Sullivan for relying in part on the arguments of Boswell in his interpretation of biblical passages dealing with homosexual behavior. She was also unpersuaded by his attempt to show that the "Prohibitionist" and "Liberationist" views are equally extreme and unreasonable, writing that the latter was "much more offensive to reason", and that Sullivan's discussion of it exposed its implicit totalitarianism. She found Sullivan's discussion of the "Conservative" view less than fully accurate, arguing that he "stresses the social utility side of conservatism, ignoring the principled ground of their argument." In particular, she maintained that Sullivan wrongly attributed natural law arguments only to the "Prohibitionists". She credited Sullivan with offering "an insightful comparison of race and sexual orientation (pointing to significant differences between them)" in his discussion of liberalism. She expressed reservations about Sullivan's legal and political proposals for homosexual equality, criticized what she saw as Sullivan's advocacy of infidelity within same-sex marriages, and suggested that "marriage is by nature heterosexual."

Schacter compared the book to Vaid's Virtual Equality (1995), describing them both as important, but as having very different objectives and approaches. She considered Sullivan's work intellectually ambitious, but questioned whether it would make possible an unemotional debate about gay rights, and argued that Sullivan's accounts of the various political stances on homosexuality were sometimes no better than caricatures. She considered this especially true of Sullivan's account of the "Liberationists", writing that Sullivan wrongly grouped together postmodernist academics who see sexuality as socially constructed, organizations such as Queer Nation and ACT UP, and supporters of outing. She was not convinced by Sullivan's criticism of Foucault and social constructionism, and found his account of the "Prohibitionist" view overly sympathetic and his attempt to critique the "Conservative" view ultimately unconvincing. She also criticized his discussion of anti-discrimination and civil rights legislation, and his endorsement of traditional institutions such as marriage and the military. She argued that Sullivan presented a less compelling case for gay rights than Vaid.

Kaplan and Stein described the book as a politically innovative attempt to deal with the issue of gay rights. They applauded Sullivan for supporting the repeal of sodomy laws, same-sex marriage, and the repeal of laws forbidding gay men and lesbians from serving openly in the military, and for opposing conversion therapy. However, they criticized opposition to laws protecting gay people from discrimination, and the arguments he provided for his political conclusions. They maintained that he wrongly believed that making a case for gay rights required accepting that homosexuality is an "inherent natural condition" or at least involuntary, and also criticized him for ignoring distinctions between "claiming that a trait is immutable, involuntary, innate, genetically determined" or "natural". They wrote that his "sympathy for a conservative sexual morality prevents him from recognizing sexuality as a primary arena for the exercise of individual moral autonomy." They found Sullivan guilty of over-generalizing from his own experience, and accused him of providing only anecdotal evidence for his claim that homosexuality is involuntary. They found Sullivan's discussion of "Liberationism" confused, and wrote that he failed to provide a serious discussion of social constructionism. They wrote that he implicitly endorsed a view of homosexuality as a "deficient, if not quite diseased, form of life" and "conservative criticisms of sexual freedom." They also maintained that Sullivan had an "overly narrow conception" of democratic politics and ignored the power relations that pervade modern social organization.

Kaplan, in his independent review of the book, noted that it had received much attention. However, he considered it disappointing. He maintained that while Sullivan had a claim to be taken seriously as a political theorist because of his academic background, and held some surprisingly radical views, he failed to articulate a general framework for considering the political relevance of homosexuality. He argued that Sullivan's assessments of the various stances on homosexuality were not neutral, and in the case of the "Prohibitionist" and "Conservative" views were overly sympathetic. He criticized Sullivan for being influenced by the Catholic Church in his understanding of sexuality and social ethics, for his attempt to justify homosexuality within the context of natural law ethics, for claiming that homosexuality is involuntary based on anecdotal claims rather than scientific literature, and for discussing social constructionism only in caricatured terms. He found Sullivan to be arrogant for assuming that all gay people experienced their homosexuality in the same way he did, denied that the claim that homosexuality is involuntary helped Sullivan to make a case for gay rights, and wrote that Sullivan had a questionable understanding of modern politics. He criticized Sullivan's case against anti-discrimination legislation, his treatment of Foucault, and his discussion of the "Liberationists", and the issue of outing. He found Sullivan to be over-optimistic in hoping that his arguments would increase support for gay rights and same-sex marriage among political conservatives.

Mohr described the book as "handsomely produced" and "beautifully written", but nevertheless considered it unsuccessful as an attempt to discuss the politics of homosexuality "from the perspective of the first principles of political theory." He wrote that Sullivan's attempt to fuse the best elements from the four stances toward homosexuality produced a confused result. He criticized Sullivan for ignoring populist, communitarian, and civic republican approaches to politics, as well as "liberalism as generally understood". He maintained that what Sullivan called "liberalism" was actually libertarianism. He described Sullivan's account of Foucault's ideas as a caricature, and criticized Sullivan's call for "formal public equality", arguing that it was an inadequate or harmful way of approaching issues such as sodomy laws and legal marriage, and ignored the question of a right to privacy. He also criticized Sullivan's treatment of natural law, arguing that Sullivan's attempts to counter natural law arguments against homosexuality were not fully successful. He argued that Sullivan attempted to make his readers feel pity for gay people by claiming that they have no choice about being homosexual, and also indulged in self-pity.

D'Emilio reviewed the book alongside Vaid's Virtual Equality, writing that they could not be more different. He contrasted Virtually Normal unfavorably with Virtual Equality, writing that Vaid's book was grounded "in the actual battles and debates" of the gay movement. Though he credited Sullivan with having written an "elegantly structured" work and with being a "superb writer", he nevertheless dismissed Virtually Normal, calling it "stupid". He described Sullivan's treatment of natural law as "nuanced and insightful", but considered it irrelevant, since the "Prohibitionists" were led by biblical fundamentalists rather than "sophisticated philosophers". He criticized Sullivan for treating the views of the "Conservatives" with respect, writing that they had "neither historical nor moral integrity", and argued that Sullivan misrepresented the "Liberationists" by falsely portraying them as followers of Foucault and caricaturing their views. He found Sullivan's discussion of liberalism "muddled". He agreed with Sullivan's call for the repeal of sodomy laws, an end to the ban on military service by openly gay people, and same-sex marriage, but wrote that it would not end heated debate over homosexuality.

Phelan wrote that the book contained the "most obvious and simple-minded liberalism" to be found among advocates for gay rights, and that Sullivan's call for an end to public but not private discrimination against gay people amounted to advocacy of a rigorous, but also arguably "rigid", form of "negative liberty". He wrote that most writers would agree with Sullivan that social change is a matter for civil society, but criticized him for neglecting the question of the state's role in civil society, thus obscuring the questions, necessary for challenging heteronormativity, of how "the state is constituted as a heterosexual body and how heterosexual imperatives constitute citizens."

=== Other evaluations and awards ===
The psychiatrist Jeffrey Satinover described Virtually Normal as a "defense of a moderate gay activist position" that was for the most part "reasonably argued". However, he considered Sullivan willfully "ignorant of success rates" in efforts to convert homosexuals to heterosexuality, believing that this undermined his arguments. The neuroscientist Simon LeVay criticized Sullivan's attempt to show that Paul did not condemn homosexuality as such, but only some specific forms of homosexual attraction and behavior. He compared Sullivan's views to those of Boswell, and argued that there is no evidence that Paul acknowledged the existence of gay people. The philosopher Edward Stein argued that Sullivan does not succeed disproving social constructionism. In 2008, Dionne concluded that Sullivan was correct to support same-sex marriage.

Sherif Girgis, Ryan T. Anderson, and the philosopher Robert P. George criticized Sullivan for supporting "openness" and "flexibility" within marriage. In their view, Sullivan's position amounted to endorsing sexual infidelity. They maintained that arguments for same-sex marriage such as those made by Sullivan show that same-sex marriage would weaken the institution of marriage. Faderman observed that upon its publication Virtually Normal became "hugely controversial". Virtually Normal won the 1996 Mencken Award for Best Book, presented by the Free Press Association.

== See also ==
- Biology and sexual orientation
- Environment and sexual orientation
