= Virtual Equality =

1995 book by Urvashi Vaid

- Cover of the first edition
- Author: Urvashi Vaid
- Language: English
- Subject: LGBT rights in the United States
- Publisher: Anchor Books
- Publication date: 1995
- Publication place: United States
- Media type: Print (Hardcover and Paperback)
- Pages: 440
- ISBN: 978-0-385-47298-2
- OCLC: 32468601
- Dewey Decimal: 305.9/0664
- LC Class: HQ76.8.U5 V35 1995

Virtual Equality: The Mainstreaming of Gay and Lesbian Liberation is a 1995 book about gay rights by lawyer and civil rights activist Urvashi Vaid, in which the author argues that LGBT movements in the United States have been only partially successful in achieving their goals, and that gay and lesbian Americans continue to suffer from discrimination and other problems. Vaid maintains that the American gay rights movement must reconsider its tactics and move from advocacy of civil equality to aiming at social change.

The book received mainly positive or mixed reviews, and was compared to the political commentator Andrew Sullivan's Virtually Normal (1995). It was seen by reviewers as partly a personal memoir by its author and partly a guide for readers on how to advance the cause of gay rights, and as having benefited from Vaid's experience as an activist. Some reviewers criticized Vaid for failing to explain fully how her proposals could be implemented. Vaid was awarded a Stonewall Book Award in 1996 for Virtual Equality.

== Summary ==
Vaid argues that the movement for gay rights in the United States has been only incompletely successful. She maintains that while its partial success is apparent from the increased openness and cultural participation of gay people, the "vast majority" of gay people are still unwilling to openly acknowledge their sexual orientation, and gay people continue to remain "profoundly stigmatized" and to suffer from problems related to "health, violence, discrimination, and social services". Vaid argues that there was a backlash against gay rights, and that most heterosexual Americans continued to view gay people as "immoral, unnatural, and unhealthy."

Comparing the problems facing the gay and lesbian movement to those facing the modern black civil rights movement and the women's liberation movement, Vaid suggests that the cause of gay rights had reached a decisive moment similar to that faced by the black civil rights movement in the 1960s and the women's liberation movement in the 1970s, having achieved greater freedom but not true equality for gay people. She argues that the gay rights movement had to consider moving beyond advocacy of civil equality and the "partial equality" it provides and aim at social change. Vaid criticizes its objective of "mainstreaming", or integration into the "status quo" of political and cultural life, maintaining that such a strategy cannot achieve "genuine freedom or full equality" because the goal of winning tolerance differs from that of winning liberation. Vaid argues that the gay rights movement had moved from the pursuit of fundamental change to the more limited goal of tolerance, and that by doing so it had adopted a pragmatic strategy that conflicted with what should be its moral objectives and "long-term vision".

== Publication history ==
Virtual Equality was first published in hardcover by Anchor Books in 1995. A paperback edition was published in 1996.

== Reception ==
=== Overview ===
Virtual Equality received positive reviews from the journalist Richard Goldstein in The Village Voice, Jeffrey Ingram in Library Journal, Matthew Rothschild in The Progressive, the historian John D'Emilio in the Journal of Homosexuality, the law professor Jane S. Schacter in Harvard Law Review, and Adrian Oktenberg in Provincetown Arts, mixed reviews from Adam Goodheart in The Washington Post and Michael Schwartz in Harvard Gay & Lesbian Review, ACT UP member Scott Tucker in The Humanist, and the critic Harriet Malinowitz in the NWSA Journal, and a negative review from the critic Bruce Bawer in The New York Times.

The book was also reviewed by Genevieve Stuttaford in Publishers Weekly, Thomas J. Jackson in the New York Native, Victoria A. Brownworth in Ms., Cindy Rizzo in Sojourner: The Women's Forum, David L. Kirp in Tikkun, Irene Elizabeth Stroud in The Women's Review of Books, Liz Sayce in off our backs, Victoria M. Davion in the Journal of Homosexuality, and in The New Yorker. Virtual Equality received two reviews in The Advocate, one by Tom Stoddard, the other by John Weir.

Many reviewers contrasted Virtual Equality with Andrew Sullivan's Virtually Normal (1995). Vaid and Virtual Equality were discussed by Todd Simmons in The Advocate and Tamara J. Michels in Lesbian News. Simmons noted that Virtual Equality had generated controversy. Vaid was interviewed about her book by Surina A. Khan in The Harvard Gay & Lesbian Review, Rizzo in Sojourner: The Women's Forum, and Anne-Marie Cusac in The Progressive. In her interview with Cusac, Vaid identified the feminist author Shulamith Firestone's The Dialectic of Sex (1970), the philosopher Simone de Beauvoir's The Second Sex (1949), and the work of socialist feminist Juliet Mitchell as influences on Virtual Equality. In 1996, Vaid was awarded a Stonewall Book Award for the work.

=== Positive reviews ===
Goldstein described the book as "the most politically adept history of the gay movement" and "essential reading for anyone who wants to understand the difference between gay liberation and gay rights." However, he believed that it was not elegantly written, gave too much space to issues of minor importance, and that it was likely to receive less attention than Virtually Normal because of Vaid's left-wing views. He criticized Vaid for suggesting that "homophobia in the black community" is solely due to racism in the gay community and underestimating the difficulty of "building a movement across class lines." Ingram described Virtual Equality as a "passionate account of the most recent successes and failures in the movement for full equality for gays and lesbians in America", calling it "Part memoir, part social activist primer". He recommended it for most libraries.

Rothschild wrote that it was one of the most impressive books he read in 1995, and described the book as "an urgent and valuable contribution to the study of social-change movements" and "a damning but instructive account of how the gay and lesbian liberation movement has sold itself short". D'Emilio wrote that while Virtual Equality and Virtually Normal were both "high profile" books about the politics of homosexuality, they could not be more different. D'Emilio contrasted Sullivan's book unfavorably with Vaid's, writing that Vaid was grounded "in the actual battles and debates" of the gay movement, and provided a detailed account of its "strategy and tactics". He noted that Vaid's criticisms of those strategies was sometimes "intense", but that she also fairly criticized herself, since she had played a significant role in gay politics. He credited her with identifying key problems faced by the gay community, such as whether gay people should decide to seek "legitimation or liberation".

Schacter considered both Virtual Equality and Virtually Normal important books, but saw their authors as having very different objectives and approaches. Schacter observed that Virtual Equality was in part a personal memoir and in part a "how to" manual for supports of the gay rights movement. She argued that it benefited from its author's experience in the gay movement and that Vaid presented a more compelling case for gay rights than Sullivan. She praised Vaid for presenting a detailed list of ways in which the gay movement could better its tactics. She endorsed Vaid's critique of the movement's ultimate objectives, agreeing with Vaid that it should form part of a coalition oriented toward "progressive politics", and aim at an "expanded conception of gay equality" that went beyond the superficial "virtual equality" that gay people have thus far achieved. However, she criticized Vaid for failing to fully spell out the connections between her vision of gay rights and her proposed tactics, and did not believe that she would convince more conservative supporters of gay rights.

Oktenberg described Virtual Equality as "a deeply democratic, deeply moral, and optimistic book" which "every gay person should read and take to heart and to action." She believed that it benefited from Vaid's experience as an activist, and that it helped show the way toward "true equality" for gay people. She credited Vaid with providing a useful history of the gay rights movement, including its failures and mistakes, as well as with synthesizing the arguments of major gay activists to provide an insightful discussion of past and present problems facing the movement. Oktenberg praised Vaid's critique of the "mainstreaming" of gays and lesbians and its associated civil rights strategies, and her style of writing. Oktenberg saw Vaid's most important observations as being that "gay culture" is "deeply moral" and that "the Right is, at its core, a totalitarian project." She contrasted Virtual Equality with works such as Sullivan's Virtually Normal, maintaining that as a "brown woman" it was natural for Vaid to address the gay rights movement as a whole.

=== Mixed reviews ===
Goodheart agreed with Vaid that while gay people in America had achieved unprecedented media visibility and political opportunity, they also faced a powerful movement hostile to gay rights. Goodheart also credited Vaid with having an "insider's perspective" on the gay rights movement, but found her book "plodding" and "repetitive", writing that it "reads as though it were written by a committee." While Goodheart considered many of Vaid's practical proposals for the movement worthwhile, he also criticized for weakening "the impact of her good ideas by giving equal time to too many suggestions, not all of them well thought out." He questioned her view that gay rights should be linked to other social causes.

Schwartz wrote that Virtual Equality and Sullivan's Virtually Normal defined "sharply contrasting positions on the gay political spectrum". Schwartz agreed with many of Vaid's political stances, but questioned whether her book would appeal to readers not already in agreement with Vaid, writing that she took the truth of many "progressive" views for granted. Though supportive of some of Vaid's practical recommendations for the gay rights movement, he also found them lacking in detail, and suggested that she attributed too much power and importance to the gay rights movement in the United States, arguing that it was weak on a national level. He disagreed with Vaid's explanations of why more gay people were not involved in the gay rights movement, and maintained that they generally had better lives than Vaid suggested. He wrote that while Vaid's ideas were powerful and her book had much to offer anyone who cares about lesbian and gay politics, her writing was "diffuse and abstract" and therefore unable to encourage gay people to support the gay rights movement. He also criticized the length and presentation of Virtual Equality, writing that a shorter book "could have conveyed the same ideas more effectively".

Tucker criticized both Vaid and Sullivan for failing to present "any thorough analysis of class conflicts", though he credited Vaid with treating "class more directly and seriously". In his view, while both authors' books were being widely read and reviewed, Vaid's work had received fewer and more hostile works in the mainstream media due to Vaid's daring in deal with the issue of class, her feminism, and her willingness to challenge "conservatives of all sexual persuasions". Tucker believed that Virtual Equality had received fairer attention in the gay press. Tucker considered Vaid generally fair in discussing gay politics, though he noted that she settled some scores in the book. He criticized her treatment of issues such as outing, "the sexuality of youth", and her discussions of groups such as ACT UP, but credited her for illuminating the current state of gay rights in the United States.

Malinowitz credited Vaid with discrediting the "mainstreaming" approach to advancing gay rights and with using "her own power to demystify power" by making "the machinations of Washington and of large national organizations comprehensible". She nevertheless found Virtual Equality to be an only partially successful work, suggesting that Vaid failed to convincingly apply "Postmodern theories of queer identity", made "vague and utopian assertions", and was unclear about the details of how her ideas should be implemented or how she could work with gay conservatives. Malinowitz found Vaid's political stances to be "at times contradictory", noting that while Vaid was a "progressive thinker" she engaged in "overtures to popular American sensibilities" by employing "religious discourse" and making favorable comments about gay and lesbian service in the American military.

=== Negative reviews ===
Bawer dismissed Virtual Equality as the work of an "ideological extremist" alarmed at the role moderates were playing in the American gay rights movement, though he believed that Vaid had moderated her tone in an attempt to win support from a larger audience, and even echoed themes from the "gay conservatives" she criticized. Bawer maintained that most gay people did not share Vaid's view that they "embody a radical differentness that makes them the natural vanguard for revolution." He criticized Vaid for suggesting that there was a "gay" position on every political issue that all gay people must accept, and rejected her proposals for cultural transformation as both utopian and vague.

== See also ==
- It Gets Better: Coming Out, Overcoming Bullying, and Creating a Life Worth Living (2011)
- LGBT in the United States
