= Alok Vaid-Menon =

American performance artist and activist (born 1991)

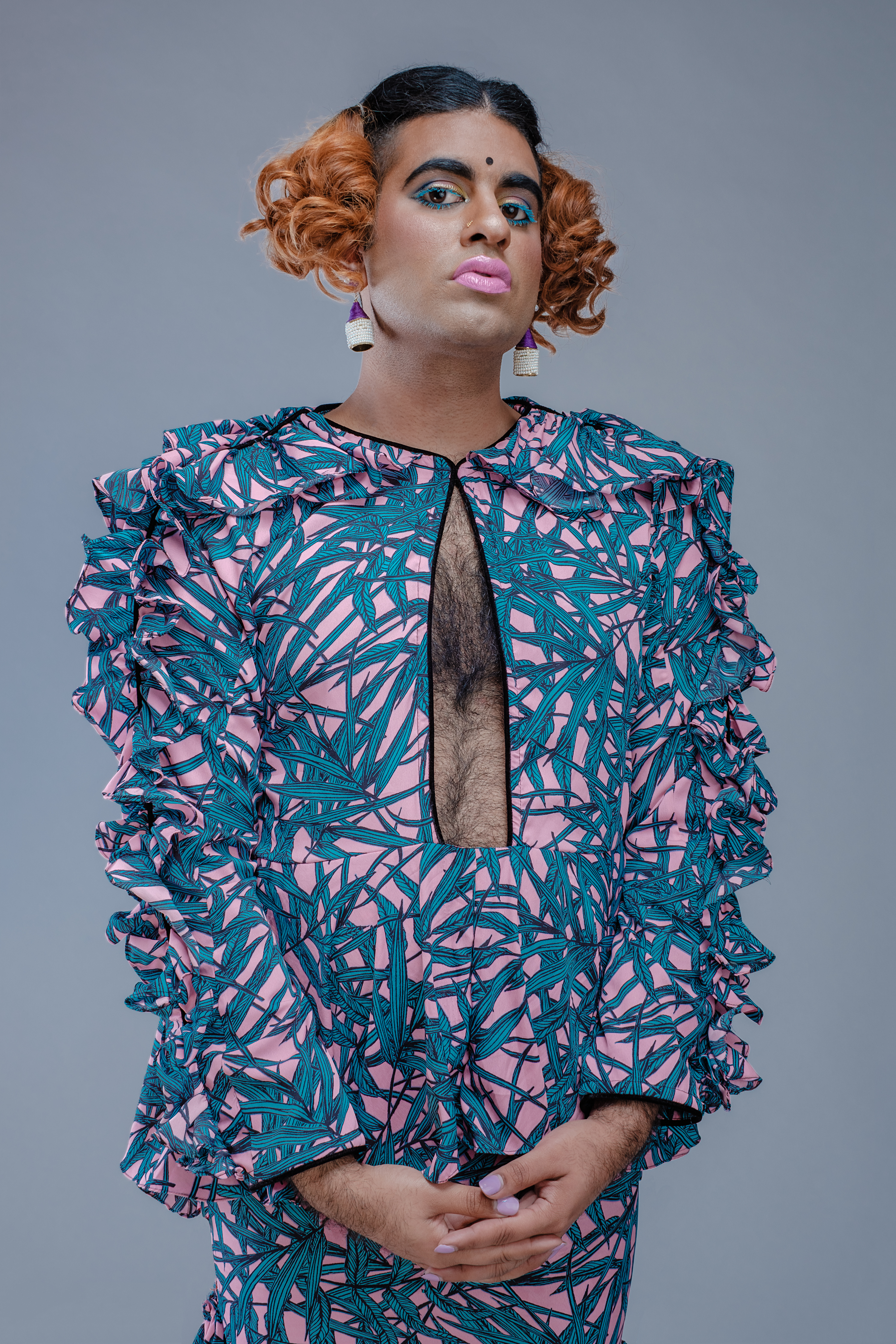
- Vaid-Menon in 2018
- Born: July 1, 1991 (age 35); College Station, Texas, U.S.
- Education: Stanford University (BA, MA)
- Occupations: Writer; performance artist; media personality
- Known for: LGBTQ+ rights advocacy
- Mother: Jyotsna Vaid
- Relatives: Krishna Baldev Vaid (grandfather); Urvashi Vaid (aunt)
- Website: alokvmenon.com

Alok Vaid-Menon (born July 1, 1991), also known mononymously as Alok (often stylized in all caps), is an American writer, performance artist, and media personality. Vaid-Menon is gender non-conforming and transfeminine, and uses singular they pronouns.

Vaid-Menon's work addresses violence against transgender and gender non-conforming people and critiques gender roles. They advocate for body diversity, gender neutrality, and self-determination. Vaid-Menon has performed in over 40 countries.

== Early life and education ==
Vaid-Menon grew up in College Station, Texas. Their father is Malayali and was born in Malaysia, who worked as a professor. Their Punjabi mother Jyotsna Vaid worked as a health care executive; she grew up in Punjab and immigrated to New York in the late 1960s when Vaid-Menon's maternal grandfather Krishna Baldev Vaid got a job at a college in the United States. Urvashi Vaid, an LGBTQ rights activist, lawyer, and writer, was Vaid-Menon's maternal aunt.

Growing up, Vaid-Menon was bullied for their race and gender expression. They felt unable to come out on their own terms because as a gender non-conforming person, they did not know they were different until they were punished for it. They developed their art practice at a young age in response to this harassment.

After leaving Texas, Vaid-Menon attended Stanford University, where they graduated with a Bachelor of Arts in feminist studies and comparative studies in race and ethnicity in 2013, as well as a master's degree in sociology.

In 2019 Vaid-Menon returned to College Station to host a pride celebration with the local LGBTQ community in honor of the 50th anniversary of the Stonewall riots.

== Career ==
=== Performance and writing ===
From 2013 to 2017, they performed with former Stanford classmate Janani Balasubramanian as a slam poetry collective named DarkMatter, engaging in queer South Asian themes. In 2017, Vaid-Menon released their first book of poetry, Femme in Public, about harassment against transfeminine people. They toured their related show internationally, partnering with local trans artists and organizations. In 2019, they completed an artist residency at The Invisible Dog Art Center, performing Strangers are Potential Friends and hosting a "Valentine's Cry-In" to explore public grief and alternative forms of intimacy. They have facilitated "Feelings Workshops" internationally. In 2020, Vaid-Menon published the non-fiction book Beyond the Gender Binary.

Vaid-Menon has been criticized by conservative media for a Facebook post by DarkMatter from 2016 that said; "These days, the narrative is that freaky transgender people (or as they say 'crossdressers' will come into your bathrooms and abuse innocent little girls [...] Little girls are also queer, trans, kinky, deviant, kind, mean, beautiful, ugly, tremendous, and peculiar. Your kids aren't as straight and narrow as you think they are". However, Vaid-Menon mentioned in a blog post in 2021 that the post was misattributed to them and was actually written by their former colleague Janani Balasubramanian.

=== Fashion ===
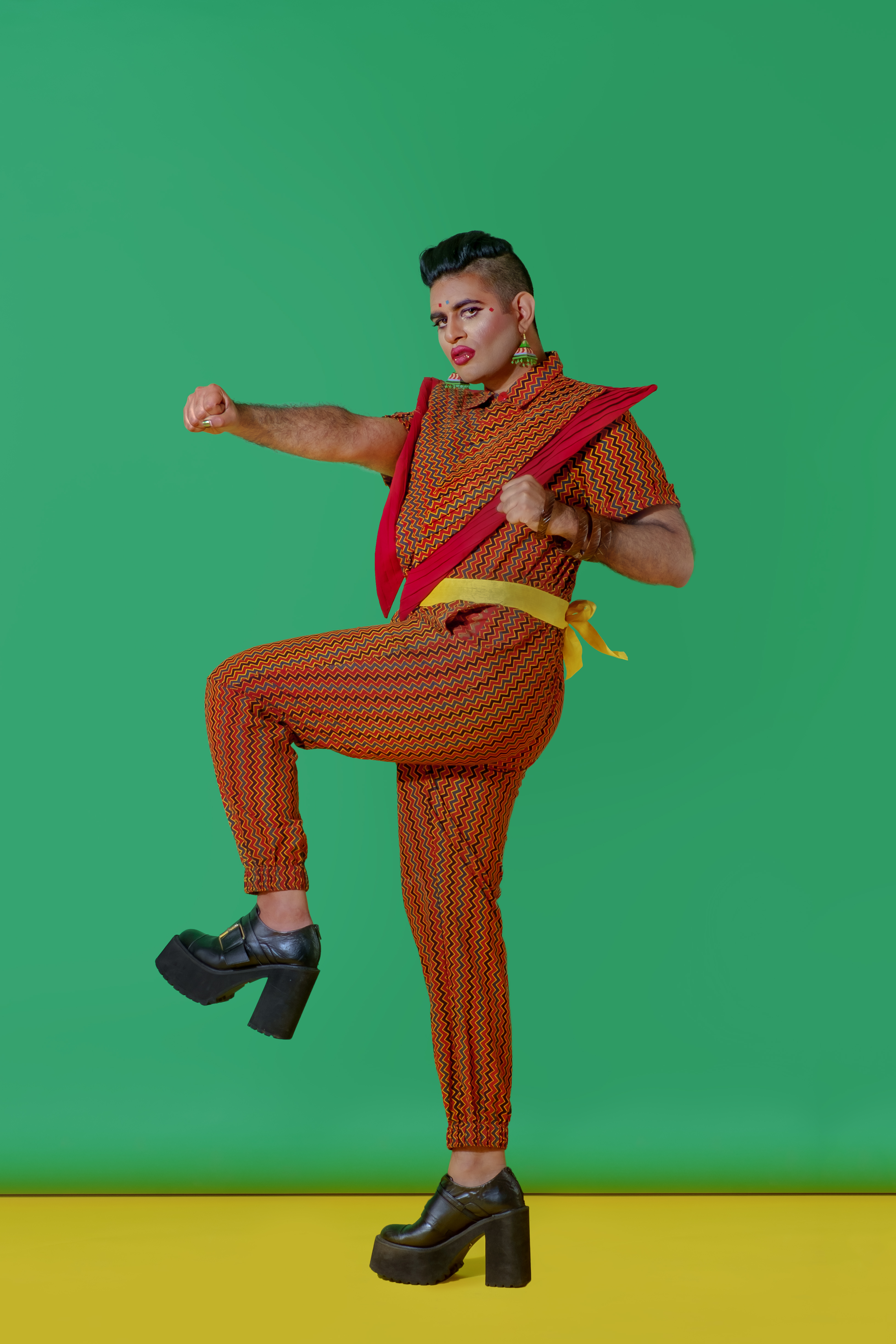
Alok Fashion Collection 2017

Vaid-Menon has walked for several fashion brands for New York Fashion Week, including Opening Ceremony, Studio 189, and Chromat. They have appeared in fashion magazines including Vogue, Vogue Italia, Bust, Wussy Magazine, and Paper.

Vaid-Menon has designed gender-neutral fashion collections featuring skirts and dresses.

In 2024, UGG partnered with Alok during Pride Month for its URSeen collection. Conservatives called for its boycott.

== Themes ==
Vaid-Menon's work addresses transmisogyny, violence against trans and gender non-conforming (TGNC) people, and TGNC representation. In The Caravan, they said: "There is a long history of trans-femme bodies being reduced to metaphor, to symbol […] and seen as stand-ins for ideas, fantasies, and nightmares." They have argued that gender non-conforming people, despite being the most visible in public, remain the most neglected by the mainstream LGBTQ movement.

Their performance style incorporates stream-of-consciousness, soundscapes, and political comedy. They have said their style, like their identity, is in constant flux and refuses easy categorization. They have described performance as "world-making" with "a commitment to vulnerability, play, interdependence, and magic." They have said the power of performance is that it is ephemeral and can never be done the same way twice, and that they use it to teach "theories and histories that have been submerged." In a 2018 interview with the Chicago Tribune, Vaid-Menon said: "The problem with a category is that you reduce something as celestial as a human being into a word. Words only approximate truth, and art is where we go when we actually want truth." In a 2019 interview with Business of Fashion, Vaid-Menon advocated for the complete de-gendering of the fashion and beauty industries.

Vaid-Menon has spoken about what they call "the international crisis of loneliness," and has sought to create public spaces for processing pain and establishing connection. They have written about using technology as a conduit for intimacy.

== Publications ==
- Femme in Public (2017)
- "Entertainment Value" in Unwatchable (edited by Nicholas Baer, Maggie Hennefeld, Laura Horak, and Gunnar Iversen; Rutgers University Press, 2019)
- Beyond The Gender Binary (illustrated by Ash Kwak Lukashevsky; Penguin Random House, 2020)
- Your Wound/My Garden (2021)

== Selected live performances ==
- 2015: Lincoln Center La Casita Festival
- 2017: Centrale Fies Drodesera Festival
- 2018: Gender Unbound Arts Festival
- 2019: Spoken Fest
- 2022: Edinburgh Festival Fringe
- 2022: Festival of Dangerous Ideas

== TV and film appearances ==
- Love Me (Refinery29, 2016)
- The Trans List (HBO, 2016)
- Random Acts of Flyness (HBO, 2018)
- Backlight "Gender Diversity & Identity In Queertopia" (VPRO, 2019)
- "What I Wish You Knew: Mental Health Roundtable" (Netflix, 2020)
- A Little Late with Lilly Singh Season 2, Episode 16 (NBC, 2021)
- Hannah Gadsby's Gender Agenda (Netflix, 2024)
- Absolute Dominion (Netflix, 2025)
