= The Dialectic of Sex =

1970 book by Shulamith Firestone

The Dialectic of Sex: The Case for Feminist Revolution
- Cover of the first edition, with a portrait of an anonymous woman by Edgar Degas
- Author: Shulamith Firestone
- Language: English
- Subject: Radical feminism
- Publisher: William Morrow and Company
- Publication date: October 1970
- Publication place: United States
- Media type: Print (hardcover and paperback)
- Pages: 216
- ISBN: 978-1784780524
- OCLC: 98546
- Text: The Dialectic of Sex: The Case for Feminist Revolution at Internet Archive

The Dialectic of Sex: The Case for Feminist Revolution is a 1970 book by the radical feminist activist Shulamith Firestone. Written over a few months when Firestone was 25, it has been described as a classic of feminist thought.

Firestone argues that the "sexual class system" predates and runs deeper than any other form of oppression, and that the eradication of sexism will require a radical reordering of society: "The first women are fleeing the massacre, and, shaking and tottering, are beginning to find each other. ... This is painful: no matter how many levels of consciousness one reaches, the problem always goes deeper. It is everywhere. ... feminists have to question, not just all of Western culture, but the organization of culture itself, and further, even the very organization of nature."

The goal of the feminist revolution, she wrote, must be "not just the elimination of male privilege but of the sex distinction itself" so that genital differences no longer have cultural significance.

== Summary ==
In The Dialectic of Sex, Firestone argues that the biological division of humans based on reproductive roles is the root of women's subordination, perpetuating a patriarchal system most evident in the nuclear family. She envisions a future where artificial wombs liberate women from childbearing, rendering pregnancy obsolete. In this cybernetic communist utopia, all labor, not just reproductive, would be automated, eradicating the basis of traditional oppression.

== Reception ==
The Dialectic of Sex is a feminist classic. Mary Anne Warren described it in 1980 as "the clearest and boldest presentation thus far of the radical feminist position". In 1998 Arthur Marwick ranked it as one of radical feminism's two key texts, along with Kate Millett's Sexual Politics (1969). Writing in The Cambridge Companion to Marx (1991), Jeff Hearn described Firestone's approach as having lasting significance in reviving interest in sexuality and reproduction as the basis of patriarchy.

Writing in The Evolution of Human Sexuality (1979), the anthropologist Donald Symons attributed to Firestone the view that, although the sexes are identical at birth, men are emotionally crippled by early experiences that women escape, and that men, unlike women, are therefore unable to love. Symons contrasted Firestone's views with his own view that "selection has produced marked sex differences in sexuality" and that neither sex is a defective version of the other.

In her introduction to the 1998 edition of the book, Rosalind Delmar argued that Firestone's "counter-explanation of problems observed by Freud relies too heavily on recourse to rationalizations", and neglect the inner world of fantasy. In Delmar's view, the result of Firestone's discussion of Freud is that "Freud is not so much refuted or rescued from his mistakes as ignored." Mary O'Brien, in her The Politics of Reproduction (1981), criticized Firestone's work for reductionism, biologism, historical inaccuracy, and general crudity.

In an interview with Anne-Marie Cusac in The Progressive, gay rights activist Urvashi Vaid identified The Dialectic of Sex as an influence on her work Virtual Equality (1995).

According to Firestone, Valerie Solanas, author of the SCUM Manifesto, told her that she disliked The Dialectic of Sex.

Juliet Mitchell argued that Firestone misreads Freud, and misunderstands the implications of psychoanalytic theory for feminism. She noted that while Firestone, like Simone de Beauvoir, attributes the term "Electra complex" to Freud, it was actually coined by Carl Jung. Mitchell suggested that for Firestone, the only kind of reality is social actuality (the generic experience or accidental experience of the individual), and that in this respect Firestone's work closely resembles that of Wilhelm Reich. In Mitchell's view, Firestone's interpretation of Freud reduces his psychological constructs to the social realities from which they were reduced, thereby equating the Oedipus complex with the nuclear family. Firestone thus interprets Freudian "metaphors" such as the Oedipus complex in terms of power relations within the family, an approach Mitchell considered mistaken.

The American journalist Susan Faludi wrote in 2013 that, although criticized for their radicalism, the basic tenets of The Dialectic of Sex have been of lasting significance. Firestone imagined reproduction outside the womb, and children being raised by collectives and granted the right to leave abusive situations. "Predictably," Faludi wrote, "the proposal[s] stimulated more outrage than fresh thought, though many of Firestone's ideas—children's rights, an end to 'male' work and traditional marriage, and social relations altered through a 'cybernetic' computer revolution—have proved prescient."

Antonella Gambotto-Burke described Sophie Lewis' 2022 book Abolish the Family as a rightful heir to The Dialectic of Sex, which in turn she described as "a book whose flagrant idiocy can be forgiven on twin grounds: the author's mental fragility and youth ... and the era's rudimentary understanding of developmental neuroscience".

== See also ==
- Postgenderism

== Notes ==
=== Sources ===
- Cusac, Anne-Marie (1996). "Urvashi Vaid". The Progressive. 60 (3).
- Delmar, Rosalind (1979). "Introduction". In Firestone, Shulamith (ed.). The Dialectic of Sex: The Case for Feminist Revolution. London: The Women's Press. ISBN 0-7043-3849-1.
- Faludi, Susan (April 15, 2013). "Death of a Revolutionary". The New Yorker.
- Firestone, Shulamith (2003) [1970]. The Dialectic of Sex: The Case for Feminist Revolution. Farrar, Straus and Giroux. ISBN 978-0-374-52787-7.
- Firestone, Shulamith (1998). Airless Spaces. Semiotext(e). ISBN 1-57027-082-1.
- Gambotto-Burke, Antonella (April 8, 2023). "Should we abolish the family?". Review. The Australian. p. 20. Archived from the original on June 9, 2023.
- Hearn, Jeff (1999). Carver, Terrell (ed.). The Cambridge Companion to Marx. Cambridge: Cambridge University Press. ISBN 0-521-36694-1.
- Marwick, Arthur (1998). The Sixties: Cultural Revolution in Britain, France, Italy, and the United States, c. 1958–c.1974. Oxford: Oxford University Press. ISBN 0-19-210022-X.
- Mitchell, Juliet (2000). Psychoanalysis and Feminism: A Radical Reassessment of Freudian Psychoanalysis. Penguin Books. ISBN 0-14-027953-9.
- Symons, Donald (1979). The Evolution of Human Sexuality. New York: Oxford University Press. ISBN 0-19502535-0.
- Warren, Mary Anne (1980). The Nature of Woman: An Encyclopedia & Guide to the Literature. Edgepress. ISBN 0-918528-07-0.
