= DarkMatter =

Artist collaboration

- Genre: spoken word
- Years active: 2009–2017
- Members: Janani Balasubramanian, Alok Vaid-Menon

DarkMatter was an art and activist collaboration between Janani Balasubramanian and Alok Vaid-Menon, known for their spoken word performances and queer/trans South Asian themes.

== Background ==
Balasubramanian and Vaid-Menon, both Indian American, met as students at Stanford University in 2009. They later joined the Stanford Slam Poetry Team and performed in spoken word venues like C.U.P.S.I. (College Unions Poetry Slam Invitational) and other college circuit slams.

The duo cited a lack of representation of South Asian poets, especially queer and/or trans South Asian poets, as an impetus for their decision to form DarkMatter and tour independently starting in 2013. Much of their poetry and activism was inspired by the lack of visibility for QTPOC (queer/trans people of color), The name DarkMatter was chosen to reflect that invisibility.

Both poets decided to finish school and move to New York, making that the center for their art and activism after their first tour in 2013. As a duo, they ran performances, workshops, and speeches for many different community groups. In 2017, they announced they were "bringing DarkMatter to a close as a collaboration in order to dedicate ourselves wholly to our solo art practices."

== Poetry ==
The poets drew inspiration from various sources, including their own emotional journeys, and the perpetuation of privilege and oppression within activism. Vaid-Menon began writing poetry in middle school, focusing largely on their emotional experience and developing into more externally political themes in college; Balasubramanian entered poetry as a freshman when Vaid-Menon brought them to their first poetry slam at Stanford.

They saw their performance as inherently political. One main topic that they sought to challenge was the concept of "homonationalism" and the violence and oppression done to people of color under the guise of queer activism that predominantly benefits white queers. Vaid-Menon described this phenomenon by saying, "Rather than critiquing state violence the gay rights 'movement' has readily sought to become a part of it."

The poets say they were drawn to spoken word and continue to create spoken word art among other forms because of the "long, deep history in black and brown communities in the U.S. as a site of resistance. It is a political form." Their poems bring to light the perpetuation of privilege and oppression within queer communities, exposing how the issues of low-income transgender people of color are being ignored.

== Political work ==
In addition to pursuing activism and social justice through poetry, both artists were engaged in various community organizations and projects dedicated to social justice. Vaid-Menon was the Communications and Grassroots Fundraising coordinator at the Audre Lorde Project, a queer people of color activism organization based in New York.

Vaid-Menon has been criticized by conservative media for their ideas about gender; especially for a Facebook post by DarkMatter from 2016, that said, "These days, the narrative is that freaky transgender people (or as they say 'crossdressers”' will come into your bathrooms and abuse innocent little girls…There are no fairy tales and no princesses here. Little girls are also queer, trans, kinky, deviant, kind, mean, beautiful, ugly, tremendous, and peculiar. Your kids aren't as straight and narrow as you think they are, Like everybody else, I’ve been a cute little girl." In 2024, when UGG partnered with Alok during Pride Month for its URSeen collection, conservatives called for its boycott. However, Alok had mentioned in a blog post in 2021 that the post is misattributed, and was written by their former colleague Janani Balasubramanian.
