= Anand Bakshi =

Indian poet and lyricist (1930–2002)

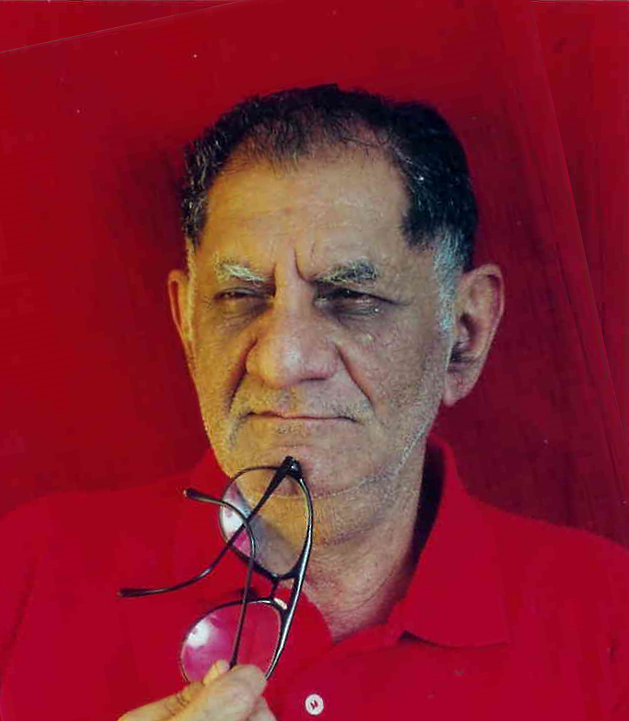
- Born: Bakshi Anand Prakash Vaid; 21 July 1930; Rawalpindi, Punjab, British India
- Died: 30 March 2002 (aged 71); Mumbai, Maharashtra, India
- Occupation: Lyricist
- Years active: 1945–2002
- Works: Full list
- Relatives: Aditya Datt (grandson)
- Awards: Filmfare Award for Best Lyricist in 1978, 1981, 1995 and 1999

Anand Bakshi (21 July 1930 – 30 March 2002) was an Indian poet and lyricist. He won Filmfare Award for Best Lyricist four times during his career. He wrote more than 6,000 film songs in more than 300 films.

== Early life ==
Anand Bakshi (Bakshi Anand Prakash Vaid) was born in Rawalpindi in the Punjab Province of British India (now in Punjab, Pakistan), on 21 July 1930 into a Mohyal Brahmin family of the Vaid clan. The family arrived in Delhi, after the Partition of India and then migrated to Pune, then to Meerut and settled finally in Delhi.

Bakshi was fond of writing poetry since his youth, but he did this mostly as a private hobby. In a 1983 interview with Doordarshan, Bakshi recounted that after his initial studies, he joined the Indian Navy, where due to a paucity of time, he could only write occasionally. He continued to write poetry whenever time permitted, and used his songs and lyrics in local programmes related to his troops. He worked in the Navy for many years and simultaneously tried to market his songs in the Mumbai film world.

== Career ==
Bakshi came to Hindi films to make a name for himself in writing and singing, but ended up becoming more successful in writing lyrics. He got his first break writing songs in a Brij Mohan film titled Bhalaa Aadmi (1958), acted by Bhagwan Dada. He was paid a sum of 150 rupees for four songs. He wrote four songs in this film for music director Nisar Bazmi. His first song in this film was "Dharti Ke Laal Na Kar Itna Malaal" which was recorded on 9 November 1956 (in his own voice on All India Radio interview).

After writing for a few movies from 1958 onwards, he first found success in 1962 with Mehendi Lagi Mere Haath (1962 film), music by Kalyanji-Anandji, with Raj Kapoor as producer. Bakshi later made another mark for himself writing a qawwali for the 1962 film Kala Samundar, the song was "Meri Tasveer Lekar Kya Karoge Tum" composed by N. Datta. He got his real big breakthrough in 1965 film with Himalay Ki God Mein, and again in 1965 with the super-hit film Jab Jab Phool Khile, starring Shashi Kapoor and both composed by Kalyanji–Anandji; and yet again in 1967 with the super-hit movie Milan (starring Sunil Dutt). These six hit films within a decade of his entry into films cemented his status as a lyrics writer.

Bakshi was preferred lyricist by Rajesh Khanna for films with Rajesh Khanna in the lead. He went on to work as a lyricist of more than 6,000 songs in more than 300 films in his career. (See Filmography below for films reference, names of the films and their year of release).

He got another break as a singer in a film directed by Mohan Kumar – Mom Ki Gudiya (1972). The first song he sang was a duet – "Baaghon mein bahaar aayi honton pe pukaar aayi", along with Lata Mangeshkar, with music composed by Laxmikant–Pyarelal. He also sang the solo "Main dhoondh raha tha sapnon mein" from the same film.

He also sang songs in four other films: Sholay (1975), where he sang the qawwali "Chand Sa Koi Chehera" along with Kishore Kumar, Manna Dey and Bhupinder, (the song was released on vinyl, but not in the feature film); Maha Chor (1976); Charas (1976) Song : Aaja Teri Yaad Aayi; and Balika Badhu (1976).

Bakshi was widely associated with music composers such as Laxmikant–Pyarelal, R D Burman, Kalyanji Anandji, SD Burman, Anu Malik, Rajesh Roshan and Anand–Milind, and his songs have been sung by all the top singers as well as other singers such as Shamshad Begum, Ila Arun, Khursheed Bawra, Amirbai Karnataki, Sudha Malhotra and others. He is known to have worked with more than one generation of music composers.

He wrote the first recorded songs of many first time male and female leads who went on to become stars, and also of singers such as Shailendra Singh, Kumar Sanu, Kavita Krishnamurthy and he established himself as a versatile lyricist with the song "Dum Maro Dum" in the movie Hare Rama Hare Krishna (1971).

After this, he wrote memorable lyrics in many movies including Bobby, Amar Prem (1971), Aradhana (1969), Jeene Ki Raah, Mera Gaon Mera Desh, Aaye Din Bahar Ke, Aya Sawan Jhoom Ke, Seeta Aur Geeta, Sholay (1975), Dharam Veer, Nagina, Lamhe, Hum (1991), Mohra (1994), Dilwale Dulhania Le Jayenge (1995), Pardes (1997), Heer Raanjha, Dushman (1998), Taal (1998), Mohabbatein (2000), Gadar: Ek Prem Katha (2001), and Yaadein (2001).

== Personal life ==
Bakshi was married to Kamla Mohan Bakshi. The couple had two daughters, Suman Datt and Kavita Bali, and two sons Rajesh Bakshi and Rakesh Bakshi.

== Death ==
Late in his life, he suffered from heart and lung diseases. In March 2002, he caught a bacterial infection at Nanavati hospital during a minor heart surgery. He died there due to multiple organ failure on 30 March 2002, at the age of 71.

== Awards ==
- Filmfare Award for Best Lyricist in 1978, 1981, 1995 and 1999.
