= Krishna Baldev Vaid =

Indian writer (1927–2020)

Krishna Vaid
- Born: Krishna Baldev Vaid; 27 July 1927; Dinga, British Raj (now Pakistan)
- Died: 6 February 2020 (aged 92); New York, U.S.
- Education: Panjab University (BA); Harvard University (MA, PhD)
- Children: 3, including Urvashi and Jyotsna
- Relatives: Alok Vaid-Menon (grandchild)

Krishna Baldev Vaid (Hindi: कृष्ण बलदेव वैद) (27 July 1927 – 6 February 2020) was an Indian Hindi fiction writer and playwright, noted for his experimental and iconoclastic narrative style.

== Early life ==
Vaid was born in Dinga, in what is now Pakistan. He and his family moved as refugees during the 1947 partition of the Indian subcontinent, which resulted in the creation of both modern India and Pakistan. Vaid studied at Punjab University and obtained his doctorate from Harvard University. His dissertation on Henry James was published by Harvard University Press in 1964 called: Technique in the Tales of Henry James.

== Career ==
He has taught at Indian universities, and moved to the United States in 1966 to continue his academic career. His literary works have been translated and published in English, French, German, Italian, Polish, Russian, Japanese and several Indian languages. His works include Uska Bachpan (1957) translated into English by Vaid and published as Steps in Darkness, Bimal Urf Jayen to Jayen Kahan translated into English as Bimal in Bog (1974) and Guzara Hua Zamana (1981) translated into English as The Broken Mirror.

Selected short stories in English translation were published as Silence and Other Stories ( Writer's Workshop, 1972), Dying Alone: A novella and Ten Short Stories (Penguin, 1992), and The Sculptor in Exile ( Penguin Books, 2014).

He did the first translation of Samuel Beckett’s plays “Waiting for Godot” and Endgame (play) into Hindi language in 1968.

== Personal life ==
After retirement as Professor of English from State University of New York, Potsdam, in 1985, Vaid lived in India for over two decades, and continued his literary activities. In 2010, he moved back to the United States, where he resided.

He was the father of Urvashi Vaid a well-known U.S. based political activist and Jyotsna Vaid an academic based in the United States. He has another daughter Rachna. Vaid was also the grandfather of the performance artist Alok Vaid-Menon.

== Works ==
=== Novels ===
- Uska Bachpan .
- Bimal Urf Jayen to Jayen Kahan .
- Nasreen
- Ek Naukrani Ki Diary
- Dard La Dava
- Doosra Na Koi
- Guzara Hua Zamana
- Kala Kolaj
- Maya Lok
- Nar Nari

=== Short-story collections ===
- Beech ka Darwaza .
- Mera Dushman.
- Bodhisatva ki Biwi.
- Badchalan Biwiyo ka Dweep.
- Doosra Kinare Se'
- Lapata
- Uske Bayan
- Vah aur main
- Khali Kitab Ka jadoo
- Pravas Ganga
- Khamoshi
- Alap Lila
- Pita Ki Parchhaiyan
- Mera Dushman: Sampoorn Kahaniyan Part 1
- Raat ki Sair: Sampoorn Kahanian Part 2

=== Story collections in English translation ===
- Silence (Writers Workshop, Calcutta,1972)
- The Sculptor in Exile (Penguin Books, 2014—issue in Modern Classics series)

=== Plays ===
- Bhookh Aag Hai
- Hamari Boodhiya
- Pariwar Akhada
- Savaal aur Swapna
- Mona Lisa ki Muskaan
- Kehte hain Jisko Payar
- Unt ka Ujala

=== Diaries ===
- Khvab hai Divane ka
- Shama har Rang mein
- Duboya Mujhko Hone Ne
- Jab Aankh Khul Gayee

=== Interviews ===
- Javab Nahin
- Criticism
- Shikast Ki Avaaz
- Criticism in English
- Technique in the Tales of Henry James (Harvard University Press, 1964)

=== Novels in English translation ===
- Bimal in Bog ( National Publishing House, 1972)
- The Diary of a Maidservant (Oxford University Press, 2007)
- Dying Alone, novella and ten stories (Penguin Books,1992)
- The Broken Mirror (Penguin Books, 1994,2014—issued in Modern Classics series))
- Steps in Darkness (Orion Press,1962, Penguin Books, 1995,2014—issued in Modern Classics series)
