= Dawood Vaid =

Dawood M. Vaid
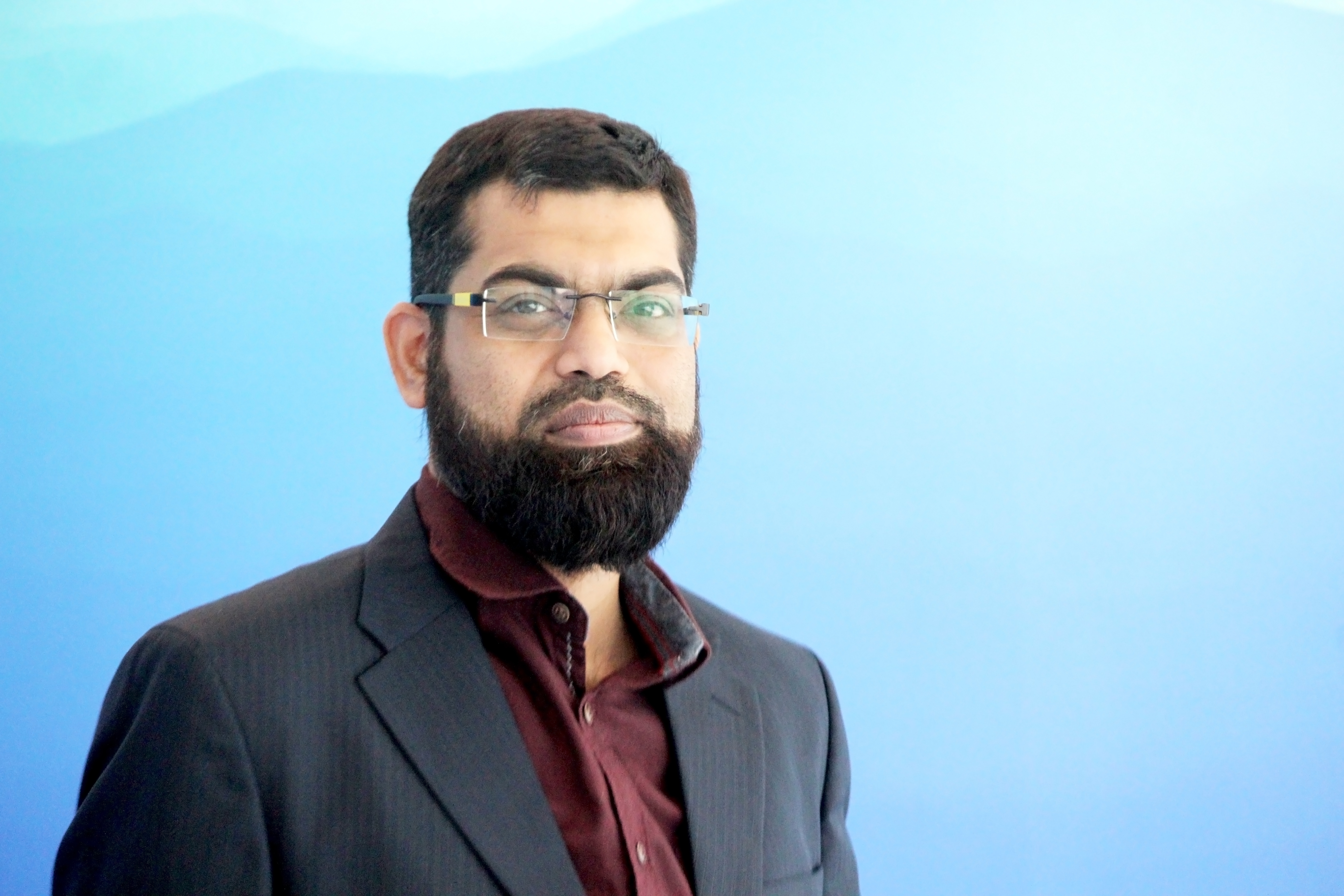
- Education: Symbiosis Institute - MBA

Dawood Vaid is an educationist and trainer, who is co-founder of Sky Education, a pan-Asia education organization. Working with scientists as a Patent & Trademark Analyst, in Moscow and Switzerland, he observed and compared different education pedagogy and created 'fun-learn' approach to learning. In four years, the school has expanded to 24 cities across India, and has 6,500 students.

He is the author of The Education Riddle and T.A.L.K.: Speak with Ease & Confidence.
