= Jyotsna Vaid =

American psychologist

- Education: Vassar College (AB); McGill University (MA, PhD)
- Children: Alok
- Relatives: Krishna Baldev Vaid (father); Urvashi Vaid (sister)

Jyotsna Vaid is a professor of cognitive neuroscience at Texas A&M University.

Vaid's research examines the impact of multilingualism by considering properties of specific languages and variability in when and how languages were acquired by bilinguals. Her research has examined the processing of evidentiality in Turkish, the processing of the impersonal "se" construction in Spanish, and word recognition in biscriptal readers of Hindi and Urdu. She has published extensively on the cognitive and neural bases of bilingualism. Most notably, Vaid's research in neuropsychology has clarified the role of the two cerebral hemispheres in bilingual language processing; her work shows that early onset of bilingualism is associated with more bilateral involvement in language, in contrast to the greater left hemisphere dominance for language among single language users. She has examined cognitive and psycholinguistic aspects of informal translation experience among bilinguals, also known as language brokering. Other topics on which she has published include number processing in bilinguals, creative thought, cognitive bases of humor, spatial biases in cognition arising from directional reading habits, self-presentation in personal ads, and gender and race disparities in professional visibility in academia.

Vaid received an A.B. in biopsychology from Vassar College and an M.A. and Ph.D. from McGill University in experimental psychology under the supervision of Wallace E. Lambert. She completed two postdoctoral fellowships, one at Michigan State University and the other jointly at the Center for Research in Language at the University of California, San Diego, and the Salk Institute for Biological Studies, before joining Texas A&M, where she is a full professor in the Department of Psychological and Brain Sciences and director of the Lingua Lab.

For 10 years Vaid edited the Committee on South Asian Women Bulletin, and in 2009 she was a co-founding editor, along with Vivian Cook and Bene Bassetti, of the journal Writing Systems Research. In 2012, Vaid co-founded the Diversity Science Research Cluster at Texas A&M University. Vaid is a fellow of the American Association for the Advancement of Science and the American Psychological Association.
