= Madan Lal Vaid =

Indian army officer

- मदन लाल वैद ਮਦਨ ਲਾਲ ਵੈਦ
- Born: Raizada Madanlal Vaid
- Military career
- Unit: Jammu and Kashmir Rifles

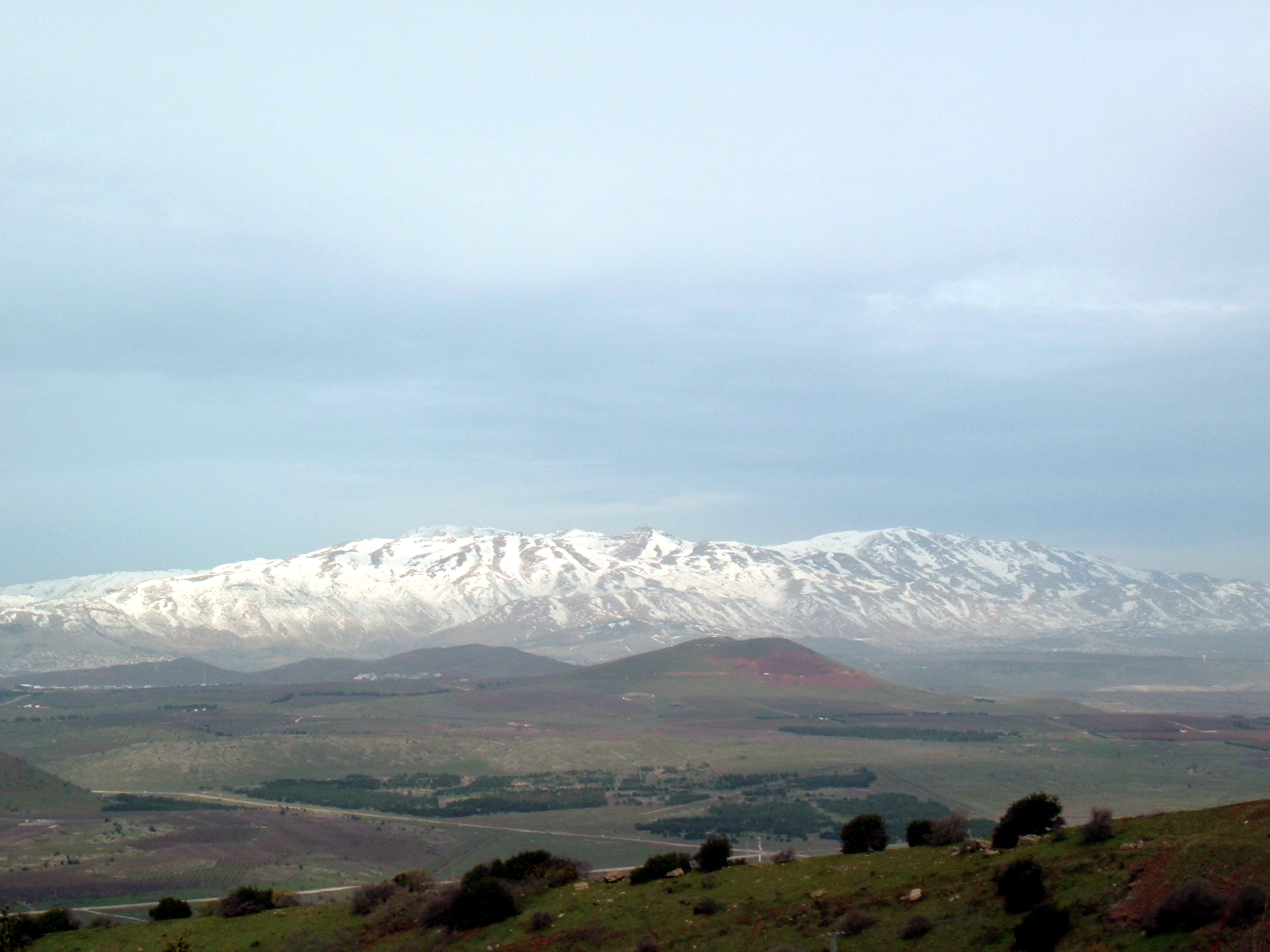
Now serene, Mount Hermon was part of the WWII warzone

Raizada Major Madanlal Vaid (Hindi: रैज़ादा मेजर मदनलाल वैद, Punjabi: ਰਾਏਜ਼ਾਦਾ ਮੇਜਰ ਮਦਨਲਾਲ ਵੈਦ) was an officer in the Jammu and Kashmir Rifles regiment of the British Indian Army until the Independence of India in 1947, and subsequently first in the Jammu-Kashmiri Army and then in the Indian Army (after the Jammu-Kashmiri Army was integrated into it). For his bravery in World War II, he was awarded the Military Cross.

== Second World War ==
He deployed in the Middle Eastern combat theater during WWII. He won the Military Cross for combat bravery Syria in July 1941, in the fight for the Jebel Mazar mountain close to Mount Hermon, during the fierce Syria-Lebanon campaign. Jebel Mazar (Latitude 34.61667N, Longitude 38.28333E) is a 5,000-foot (1,500 m) mountain dominating the Damascus-Beirut route that the enemy was using very effectively to prevent British Commonwealth (British, Australian and Indian) troops from advancing to Beirut. His actions as recorded in the medal commendation (from the British National Archives, verbatim without corrections):

In the operations carried out by the 16th Infantry Brigade in the DAMASCUS Sector on tenth July, 1941, the 1st (Indep) "J" & "K" Mountain Battery, I.S.F., was under the Command of 2nd King's Own Royal Regiment in their attack on the JEBEL MAZAR feature.

At an early hour on the morning of 10 July - the Commander, 2nd King's Own Royal Regiment was out of touch with his two forward Companies whom he knew to be held up in their advance on Points 1404 and 1455. He decided that a Forward Observation Officer should be sent forward to bring supporting fire to the Company on Point 1404. Lieut. MADN LAL VAID was detailed for this purpose, and although the Commander, 2nd King's Own Royal Regiment was unable to instruct him exactly where to go and find the Company himself. He took his Forward Observation Officer's party across an open valley, swept by Machine Gun fire where no movement had taken place since first light, made contact with the Company Commander, and established line communication from the Forward Observation Post to the Battery Position, thus giving the Battalion Commander communication with his forward Company.

Immediately on his arrival at the Company position he engaged Mortars and Machine Guns which were causing casualties, and in spite of the proximity of our own troops to his targets, he carried out extremely effective shoots and destroyed one Machine Gun and one Mortar. Our troops on this feature were surrounded on three sides and were under continuous M.G. and Mortar fire, and it was very largely the quick and effective shooting by Lieut. MADAN LAL which enabled the company to retain its hold on this position in spite of heavy enemy pressure, both by reason of its damage to the enemy and its encouraging effect on the morale of our own troops.
