= Wussy Magazine =

American LGBT and Southern interest magazine

- Cover of the Spring/Summer 2020 issue, featuring Angelica Ross
- Editor-in-chief: Rachel Garbus
- Writing Editor: Nicholas Goodly
- Managing Editor: Jon Dean
- Art Editor: Kerosene Jones
- Categories: LGBT culture, Southern culture
- Founder: Jon Dean; Zaida Sanchez; Matt Jones (deceased)
- Based in: Atlanta, Georgia
- Website: www.wussymag.com

Wussy Magazine, stylized as WUSSY MAG, is an Atlanta based LGBT and Southern interest magazine which showcases LGBT culture and expression in the South. The magazine was founded by Jon Dean, its current editor-in-chief in 2015. Wussy Mag publishes online articles, a quarterly arts magazine and a biannual print edition.

== History ==
Wussy was originally built by queer writers and photographers who hosted events and art shows together. Wussy was launched in 2014 as an online magazine for the Atlanta LGBT community. Founder Jon Dean stated that the original purpose of the magazine was to document queer culture in the Southern United States although it has since expanded to a national scope.

Dean explained the origin of the magazine's name in an interview with The Georgia Voice: "I didn’t want the name to speak to one kind of experience. The word wussy is equal parts masculine and feminine, and being a queer Southern sissy is something that we are all proud to be."

The magazine showcases photography of genderbending and genderqueer culture and expression. Wussy frequently interviews and showcases queer artists as well as drag queens such as Violet Chachki, Jujubee, Lady Bunny, Monét X Change, Rify Royalty and the Boulet Brothers. The magazine's co-founder and Operations Manager Matt Jones died in 2018.

Wussy also organizes various community and nightlife events for the LGBT community in the Atlanta area. These include queer proms, beach parties and sex positive events. The publication has also curated compilations and gallery events in support of Atlanta-based organizations.
