= Jane S. Schacter =

Jane S. Schacter (born June 27, 1958) is an American legal scholar who serves as the William Nelson Cromwell Professor of Law at Stanford Law School with an expertise in constitutional law, statutory interpretation, and sexual orientation law. As an expert on the topic of marriage equality, Schacter has been interviewed by numerous leading news publications, including The New York Times, The Washington Post, The Economist, The Guardian, Bloomberg Businessweek, and the San Francisco Chronicle.

== Education and early career ==
Schacter graduated from Scarsdale High School in 1976. She received her A.B. in History from the University of Michigan in 1980 and her J.D., cum laude, from Harvard Law School in 1984. From 1984 to 1985, Schacter clerked for the Honorable Raymond James Pettine of the United States District Court for the District of Rhode Island.

Following her clerkship, Schacter worked as a litigation associate for the law firm of Hill & Barlow in Boston, Massachusetts, from 1985 to 1987 and again from 1989 to 1991. From 1987 to 1989, Schacter worked as an assistant attorney general for the Massachusetts Department of the Attorney General.

== Career ==
Schacter joined the law faculty of the University of Wisconsin Law School in 1991, where she was an assistant professor of law from 1991 to 1996 and an associate professor of law from 1996 to 1998. Schacter left for the University of Michigan Law School in 1998 but returned to the University of Wisconsin Law School as a professor of law in 2000. At the University of Wisconsin, Schacter won numerous teaching awards, including the Chancellor's Award for Distinguished Teaching in 1998 and the Alumni Association Teacher of the Year Award in both 1996 and 2005.

Schacter joined the Stanford Law School faculty in 2006 and was named the William Nelson Cromwell Professor of Law in 2007.

== Publications ==
Schacter co-edits a leading casebook on constitutional law, Cases and Materials on Constitutional Law (5th ed.) (with William N. Eskridge & Philip P. Frickey), and a leading casebook on sexual orientation and the law, Cases and Materials on Sexual Orientation and the Law (5th ed.) (with William B. Rubenstein, Carlos A. Ball, and Douglas G. Nejaime).

Schacter has written widely on the topics of constitutional law and marriage equality. Her work has been published in the Michigan Law Review, the Yale Law Journal, the Harvard Law Review, the Stanford Law Review, the New York University Law Review, and the Southern California Law Review.
