= Urvashi Vaid =

Indian-American LGBT rights activist, lawyer and writer (1958–2022)

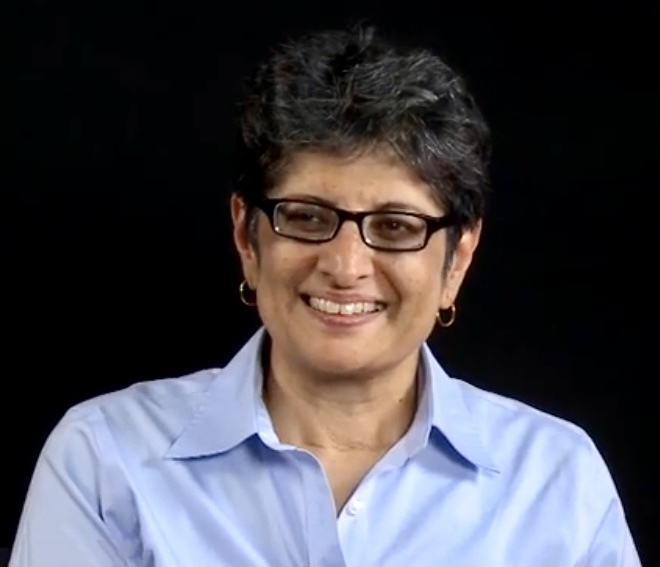
- Vaid in 2014
- Born: October 8, 1958; New Delhi, India
- Died: May 14, 2022 (aged 63); New York City, New York, U.S.
- Education: Vassar College (AB); Northeastern University (JD)
- Known for: Civil rights and anti-war activism
- Notable work: Virtual Equality (1996)
- Partner: Kate Clinton (1988–2022)
- Relatives: Jyotsna Vaid (sister); Krishna Baldev Vaid (father); Alok Vaid-Menon (nibling)

Urvashi Vaid (October 8, 1958 – May 14, 2022) was an Indian-born American LGBT rights activist, lawyer, and writer. An expert in gender and sexuality law, she was a consultant in attaining specific goals of social justice. She held a series of roles at the National LGBTQ Task Force, serving as executive director from 1989 to 1992; she was the first woman of color to lead a national gay-and-lesbian organization. She is the author of Virtual Equality: The Mainstreaming of Gay and Lesbian Liberation (1995) and Irresistible Revolution: Confronting Race, Class and the Assumptions of LGBT Politics (2012).

== Early life and education ==
Urvashi Vaid was born on October 8, 1958, in New Delhi, India, to writer Krishna Baldev Vaid and poet and painter Champa née Bali Vaid. One of three daughters, Vaid lived with her grandparents in India while her parents attended university in the US. She moved to Potsdam, New York, in 1966 after her father took a teaching position at the State University of New York at Potsdam. She was politically active at a young age, writing letters to Richard Nixon in support of the Anti-Ballistic Missile Treaty, participating in anti-Vietnam War marches, and giving speeches during George McGovern's presidential campaign.

Vaid graduated from Potsdam High School after three years, in 1975, and attended Vassar College, where she studied English literature and political science. At Vassar, she was active in a variety of political and social causes, including co-founding the Feminist Union on campus, starting the November 12th Coalition to protest sexist admission policies, co-organizing the Feminist Union Socialist Symposium, and participating in activism against apartheid. She graduated in 1979. After graduating from Vassar, Vaid moved to Boston, where she interned briefly at the Women's Prison Project and worked as legal secretary before beginning law school at the Northeastern University School of Law. She was politically active while living in Boston, co-founding the Allston-Brighton Greenlight Safehouse Network, a neighborhood anti-violence project, as well as the Boston Lesbian/Gay Political Alliance with Eric Rofes. She was also involved with Lesbians United in Non-Nuclear Action (LUNA), the Boston Food Co-op, the Gay and Lesbian Advocates and Defenders (GLAD), and the Boston Pride March committee. While attending Northeastern, she also worked as a writer at the Gay Community News. She received her Juris Doctor degree from Northeastern in 1983.

== Career ==
From 1983 to 1986, Vaid was staff attorney at the National Prison Project of the American Civil Liberties Union (ACLU), where she initiated the organization's work on HIV/AIDS in prisons. For more than ten years, Vaid worked in various capacities at the National LGBTQ Task Force (NGLTF), the oldest national LGBT civil rights organization; first as its media director, then as executive director (1989–1992), and as director of its Policy Institute think tank. While executive director, Vaid disrupted a presidential press conference being held by President George H. W. Bush with a sign reading "Talk Is Cheap, AIDS Funding Is Not". She also co-founded the NGLTF's Creating Change conference.

Vaid spent ten years working in global philanthropic organizations, serving as executive director of the Arcus Foundation (2005–2010), deputy director of the Governance and Civil Society Unit of the Ford Foundation (2001–2005), and board member of the Gill Foundation (2004–2014). She was the director of the Engaging Tradition Project at the Center for Gender and Sexuality Law at Columbia Law School from 2011 to 2015. The project focused on the way tradition is used in movements for gender and sexuality to inform, enable, or limit the movement.

Vaid was the founder of LPAC, the first lesbian Super PAC, which was launched in July 2012 and, as of 2020, has invested millions of dollars in candidates who are committed to legislation promoting social justice. She was also founder of the Vaid Group, a social innovation consultancy that advises individuals and organization working to advance equity, justice, and inclusion globally and domestically. At the time of her death, Vaid was president of the Vaid Group.

== Political activism ==
Vaid believed that LGBTQ equality will occur only when the larger institutions of society and the family are transformed to be more inclusive of racial, gender, and economic difference. Her book Virtual Equality: The Mainstreaming of Gay and Lesbian Liberation (1995) won a Stonewall Book Award in 1996.

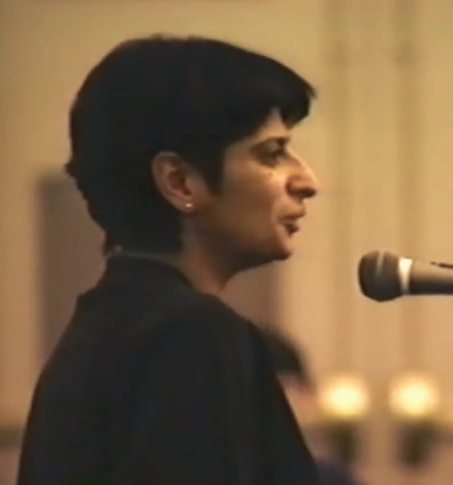
Vaid at the 1993 National LGBTQ Task Force's Creating Change Conference

Vaid became executive director of the National Gay and Lesbian Task Force (NGLTF) in 1989. Vaid left NGLTF in December 1992 to write Virtual Equality (published in 1995). She returned to NGLTF from 1997 to 2001 as the director of its think tank, the NGLTF Policy Institute.

Vaid worked for five years at the Ford Foundation, and served as executive director of the Arcus Foundation. She served on the board of the Gill Foundation from 2004 to 2014. Upon the death of former president George H. W. Bush in 2018, Vaid, who had been executive director of NGLTF during his presidency, commented on the Bush's legacy regarding AIDS, saying: "If one was being charitable one could say it was a mixed legacy, but in truth it was a bad legacy of leadership [...] He did not lead on AIDS."

Vaid was a staunch sexual liberationist. As Richard Burns, who had been the managing editor of the Gay Community News prior to becoming Vaid's classmate at Northeastern, recalled: "If I told her about a sex club, she wanted to go, too," Burns said. "And then we did, and then we were thrown out when they discovered she was not a guy. More than once." A co-worker at the National LGBTQ Task Force remembered in article in The New Yorker: "In 1990, Urvashi gave us a fisting demonstration at our Task Force staff meeting, raising her hand in the air and creating the proper form."

In 2009 and 2010, Out magazine named her one of the 50 most influential LGBT people in the United States.

Vaid and Kate Clinton interviewed by Laura Flanders in 2014

Vaid's book Irresistible Revolution: Confronting Race, Class and the Assumptions of LGBT Politics (2012) critiques the racial and gender bias of the mainstream LGBT movement and continues her argument that engagement with social justice is what will enable all parts of the LGBT community to realize equality and justice. Vaid told Curve magazine that her biggest fear was that LGBT communities would get preoccupied by the wins in the fight for marriage equality and slow down their movement. She argued for a more inclusive movement, one that would encompass everyone regardless of race, class, ethnicity, age, or ability.

Vaid hoped that the future of LGBT communities would accomplish two things: taking care of their least powerful members and using their political power to create a more just society. In a conversation between Vaid and Larry Kramer in 1994, Vaid made an argument for intersectional solidarity within HIV and reproductive issues, connecting them with racism, homophobia, and state power. In an article written in 2014 for the Journal of Lesbian Studies, Vaid called for a greater activist response for and by people with breast cancer, citing the direct action work of ACT UP for AIDS activism.

Shortly after her death in 2022, Vaid was added to the National LGBTQ Wall of Honor at Stonewall Inn.

== Personal life ==
In 1988, Vaid met political comedian Kate Clinton at the War Conference of gay rights activists in Warrenton, Virginia, and the couple married in 2013. She shared homes with Clinton in Manhattan, New York, and Provincetown, Massachusetts.

Vaid died at her home in New York from breast cancer on May 14, 2022. She had previously been diagnosed with thyroid cancer. Vaid was the aunt of Alok Vaid-Menon, a gender non-conforming writer, performance artist, and media personality.

== Awards ==
- 1996: Stonewall Book Award for Non-fiction
- 1996: Lambda Legal Lambda Liberty Award
- 1997: Asian American Legal Defense & Education Fund Civil Rights Leadership Award
- 1999: CUNY School of Law honorary degree
- 2002: AmfAR Award of Courage
- 2006: National Lesbian and Gay Law Association Dan Bradley Award
- 2008: GMHC Lifetime Achievement Award
- 2010: Services & Advocacy for GLBT Elders Ken Dawson Advocacy Award
- 2010: CLAGS: The Center for LGBTQ Studies Kessler Award
- 2013: American Library Association Over The Rainbow Project Book List for Irresistible Revolution
- 2014: Teachers College, Columbia University Social Justice Action Award
- 2014: Gay & Lesbian Advocates & Defenders Spirit of Justice Award
- 2015: Kalamazoo College honorary degree
- 2022: National LGBTQ Task Force Susan J. Hyde Award for Longevity in the Movement

== Works ==
- Vaid, Urvashi (1996). Virtual Equality: The Mainstreaming of Gay and Lesbian Liberation. Anchor Books, Doubleday. ISBN 0-385-47298-6.
- Vaid, Urvashi; D'Emilio, John; Turner, William B. (2002). Creating Change: Sexuality, Public Policy, and Civil Rights. Stonewall Inn Editions. ISBN 0-312-28712-7.
- Vaid, Urvashi (2011). Savage, Dan; Miller, Terry (eds.). It Gets Better: Coming Out, Overcoming Bullying, and Creating a Life Worth Living. Dutton. ISBN 978-0525952336.
- Vaid, Urvashi (2012). Irresistible Revolution: Confronting Race, Class and the Assumptions of LGBT Politics. Magnus Books. ISBN 978-1-936833-29-0.

== In popular culture ==
Her name appears in the lyrics of the Le Tigre song "Hot Topic".
