= Sexual Ecology =

1997 book by Gabriel Rotello

Sexual Ecology: AIDS and the Destiny of Gay Men
- Author: Gabriel Rotello
- Language: English
- Subject: HIV/AIDS
- Publisher: Dutton
- Publication date: 1997
- Publication place: United States
- Media type: Print (Hardcover and paperback)
- ISBN: 0-525-94164-9
- OCLC: 35961466
- Dewey Decimal: 362.1/969792/0086642 21
- LC Class: RA644.A25 R68 1997

Sexual Ecology: AIDS and the Destiny of Gay Men is a 1997 book by gay activist Gabriel Rotello, who discusses why HIV continued to infect large numbers of gay men despite the widespread use of condoms and why a number of experts believed that new HIV infections will disproportionately affect gay men in the future. Rotello examines the origins and timeline of the AIDS epidemic, drawing on epidemiology, sociology, gay history, and ecology. His conclusion is that gay men need to reduce their number of partners and increase condom use to bring the infection rate down. Rotello's central argument derives from the epidemiological concept that sexually transmitted epidemics are the result of three factors, sometimes called the Triad of Risk: the "infectivity" of a sexually transmitted disease (STD), or how easily it spreads; the "prevalence" of that STD in a particular group; and the "contact rate," or the average number of sexual partners that people have within a particular group.

Rotello writes that gay men significantly lowered the first leg of the triad (infectivity) with condom use, but condoms alone were unable to quell the epidemic because the second leg of the triad (prevalence) was already so high. Gay men needed to address the third leg of the triad: the contact rate. According to Rotello, lowering the contact rate while continuing to emphasize condoms might provide enough additional "room for error" to bring new infections below the epidemic's tipping point.

Sexual Ecology was considered a major contribution to AIDS discourse, and became a gay bestseller. New Scientist called it "a remarkable book ... a breath of fresh air in the growing litany about the AIDS epidemic." The New York Times called the book "trenchant" and "brave", saying that it "merits the attention of a broad audience"; The Boston Globe described it as "the Silent Spring of the AIDS epidemic." It was also praised by the LGBT community. For The Nation, gay historian Martin Duberman called Sexual Ecology "the most important book about gay men and AIDS since And the Band Played On. And it is far better."

The book was criticized by others in the gay community for arguing that multiple partners played a significant role in the etiology and longevity of the gay AIDS epidemic and that, with condom use, partner reduction was key to containing the epidemic. In The Village Voice, Mark Schoofs called Sexual Ecology "toxic" and "an ugly distortion of gay life." AIDS activist Jim Eigo compared Rotello to right-wingers such as Pat Buchanan and Jesse Helms, writing that he "scapegoats and stigmatizes those of us who engage in multipartnerism." The Sex Panic! activist organization was formed in part to combat the message of Sexual Ecology, accusing Rotello and other writers the group called "gay neo-cons" (particularly Michelangelo Signorile, Larry Kramer, and Andrew Sullivan) of betraying gay sexual freedom.

== Background ==
During the 1980s, Rotello was a New York City AIDS activist and a member of ACT UP. In 1989, he founded the magazine OutWeek and became its editor-in-chief. The New York Times called it "the most progressive of the gay publications," saying that it "gave voice to a new generation of AIDS activists ... and provided a rallying point for the more militant members of the gay community." Rotello was controversial for promoting the word "queer" as a catchall phrase for sexual minorities and for the phenomenon of "outing," which began at OutWeek; he considered himself a member of the gay left. In 1992, he became the first openly-gay man to become an op-ed columnist for a major American newspaper (New York Newsday) and used that platform to argue for gay rights and AIDS activism.

During Rotello's tenure at New York Newsday, AIDS epidemiologists began reporting a "second wave" of HIV infections among gay men. Some studies indicated that 40 percent or more of young gay men would become infected with HIV by the time they reached middle age, despite the wide promotion of condoms. Many activists, including Rotello, had previously argued that the problem of new HIV infections had been largely solved by the promotion of condoms in the 1980s.

He began investigating the underlying reasons why AIDS had affected gay men originally and why it was continuing. One result was "The Birth of AIDS", a cover story for the magazine Out that described the emerging scientific consensus that HIV had existed in human populations for decades before the 1980s but had not previously produced an epidemic because it required a unique set of circumstances to spread. The article was eventually expanded into Sexual Ecology.

As Rotello began writing the book, gay sex clubs opened in New York City which allowed unprotected anal sex in open settings for the first time in over a decade. He wrote columns criticizing this for New York Newsday, and joined a group called Gay and Lesbian HIV Prevention Activists (GALHPA), which believed that such venues should enforce safe sex or be closed. GALHPA's stance was controversial and reignited the "bathhouse debates" of the early 1980s. It was against this backdrop that Sexual Ecology was published by Dutton in 1997.

== Summary ==
Rotello presents a number of myths about the epidemic. HIV existed in humans for at least several decades before the AIDS epidemic first appeared in Africa, Haiti, and American gay men. According to this theory, HIV did not cause previous epidemics because it is difficult to transmit and the collective behaviors needed to create an epidemic did not exist before the sexual and IV-drug revolutions of the 1960s and 1970s.

Before World War II, most American gay men did not engage in high-risk behavior; they had fewer partners and were more inclined to have oral (rather than anal) sex. Gay men had fewer STDs than the heterosexual population. An epidemiological "tipping point" is when an infected person infects more than one other person and a disease begins to spread. A triad of risk is prevalence (the percentage of people in a pool of sex partners who are already infected), infectivity (the likelihood that a disease will be transmitted during one sexual encounter), and contact rate (the average number of sexual partners in a given population).

Simply put, without partner change no STD can spread. Partner A may infect partner B, but things will end there. In a thoroughly monogamous population, there would be no STDs at all, no matter how infectious certain microbes might theoretically be. Conversely, the higher the level of partner change, the more likely that even microbes that are relatively hard to transmit will have an opportunity to spread.

"Core groups", smaller groups who transmit STDs at higher levels than the surrounding population, are an additional factor. Core members have large numbers of sexual partners who have large numbers of partners, creating a feedback loop which can amplify disease.

During the 1960s and 1970s, gay liberation and casual sex with multiple partners became widespread; similar changes among young heterosexuals were overshadowed by the gay community's network of bars, cruising areas, sex clubs, and bathhouses. Attendees of gay bathhouses and sex clubs might have hundreds of sexual partners per year, leading to sexually transmitted epidemics of syphilis, gonorrhea, herpes, giardia and other intestinal parasites, hepatitis A and B, Epstein-Barr virus, chlamydia, and cytomegalovirus.

From rare viruses such as HTLV to more common infections such as hepatitis A, every sexually transmitted infection that entered the gay male ecosystem rose to unprecedented levels, so that by the end of the decade homosexual men had by far the highest sexually transmitted disease load of any social group in America. In many instances, it was dozens or even, as with intestinal parasites, hundreds of times higher than average.

HIV entered this system and began to spread. A study of Hepatitis B transmission among gay men began in 1978, and its blood samples

... were to become invaluable measures of the rise of HIV infection once a test for HIV antibodies became available in the mid-eighties. Researchers were then able to go back, retest the blood, and obtain a stop-motion picture of HIV’s deadly incursion into the gay male population.

When the study began, the percentage of gay men infected with HIV was in the low single digits. It rose to between 40 and 60 percent in most test cities by 1985, with peaks of 58 percent in Denver and Seattle, 60 percent in San Diego, 70 percent in Philadelphia, and 73 percent in San Francisco. HIV took longer to start and spread than the other epidemics because of its lower infectivity. Aspects of gay sexual ecology cited by epidemiologists included insertive-receptive versatility, partner concurrency, viral load, reduced immunity due to STD re-infection and substance abuse, and the role of travel. According to evolutionary biologist Paul W. Ewald, high levels of HIV transmission among gay men produced more virulent strains of the virus.

AIDS prevention and the "condom code" developed during the mid-1980s. Condoms became the primary response to AIDS prevention in the gay world after the publication of "How to Have Sex in an Epidemic", a pamphlet by Michael Callen and Richard Berkowitz. The code was expected to prevent new infections and allow the gay sexual revolution to continue.

A second wave of AIDS arose during the 1990s. Gay men were using condoms up to 60 percent of the time, but epidemiological studies and mathematical models indicated that it was not enough to bring the epidemic below the tipping point. The late-1980s drop in new infections was due to saturation; when 50 to 60 percent of gay men were infected, infections declined until a new cohort of young, uninfected men became sexually active. Prevention activists focused on increasing condom use, citing a lack of safer-sex education, condom availability, the closet, and substance abuse.

Dieters slip off their diets. Alcoholics fall off the wagon. Former smokers impulsively light up. Responsible drivers sometimes drive drunk or fail to buckle up. Couples desperate not to have a child sometimes fail to use birth control. Failure at compliance is not a specifically "gay" problem, and although failure to be perfect can be exacerbated by contributing factors like lack of education, substance abuse, self-hatred, or survivor’s guilt, such failure is not in its deepest sense caused by those factors, at least not for most people. It seems part of many of our natures to be occasionally impulsive creatures who do not always act in our own genuine long-term best interests. In fact, from the perspective of behavior change, the amazing thing about gay men’s rate of condom use is not that it is so low, but that it is so high. Compared to campaigns that attempt to encourage people to quit smoking, or to diet and exercise, or to quit using addictive drugs, campaigns that often measure success in single percentage points, the consistent adoption of condoms by approximately half of all gay men is a remarkable success by almost any behavioral scale.

AIDS was not epidemic among heterosexuals in the developed world but was in sub-Saharan Africa, Haiti, and Thailand, infecting heterosexuals whose behavior was similar to gay male behavior in the United States.

... the global epidemic clearly demonstrates that AIDS is not a "gay disease." Homophobic theories that AIDS proves the inherent "unnaturalness" of homosexuality are belied by global statistics showing that 90 percent of all cases worldwide are spread via heterosexual sex. However, those same statistics illustrate that while AIDS is not a gay disease, it is certainly an ecological disease that will strike with fury at any population whose collective sexual behavior is characterized by high contact rates, active core groups, high levels of sexual mixing, and high carriage of other STDs.

Although condoms are the most important element of HIV prevention, reliance on them obscured the need to address multiple partners and active core groups. A prevention strategy must emphasize condoms, encourage partner reduction, and discourage core-group behavior. Gay marriage might encourage partner reduction, but gay men must realize the true causes of the epidemic and the reasons for its longevity.

== Reception ==
=== Mainstream press ===
In a starred review, Kirkus Reviews called Sexual Ecology "a compelling warning about gay culture and the imperative need for a change in beliefs and behavior. Rotello's message has been carefully and convincingly laid out. Well aware that his call for increased sexual restraint will be seen as reactionary and homophobic by those who cling to an orgiastic view of gay liberation, he anticipates their arguments and answers them persuasively in this impressive analysis of a pressing social problem." In another starred review, Publishers Weekly said that Rotello's "brave, significant book deserves to be as widely read as Randy Shilts' And the Band Played On." Salon.com called Sexual Ecology " ... a bombshell ... a transformative plan for sustaining gay culture and dealing with AIDS ... Ideally, Sexual Ecology will lead to more honest, rational discussion about AIDS transmission, without feeding the hellfire flames favored by anti-gay outsiders. Ideally, it will generate practical, beneficial action." A Boston Globe reviewer wrote that Rotello " ... cogently rethinks the epidemic as the ecologically enabled result of HIV's biology and post-Stonewall gay sex ... He seeks "a sustainable gay culture, one that does not destroy the very souls it liberates" with a sexual ecology that must constantly add unnatural appliances, ranging from condoms to pills to who knows what else, to keep its members alive." The Sun Sentinel called Sexual Ecology a "scrupulously researched and carefully constructed argument for a gigantic shift in how we view sexually transmitted diseases ... This book marks a turning point, as perhaps the first major work to challenge how the dogma of gay liberation and AIDS education have sometimes blended into a potentially unhealthy cocktail of misinformation."

=== Scientific press ===
Sexual Ecology was supported by the scientific and public-health communities. New Scientist called the book "remarkable" and " ... a breath of fresh air in the growing litany about the AIDS epidemic." Thomas J. Coates, former director of the Center for AIDS Prevention Studies at UCSF, wrote: "As Gabriel Rotello argued in his book Sexual Ecology, an urban gay culture built around gay men each having unprotected sex with hundreds or thousands of different partners is simply not sustainable. It is not only the epidemics we all know about; other epidemics are waiting to happen." In his book, The Tipping Point, Canadian journalist Malcolm Gladwell called Rotello's description of STD epidemiology in Sexual Ecology " ... one of the best lay treatments of the mechanics of a disease epidemic." It entered the syllabi of a number of medical schools, and is widely read in schools of public health in the United States and abroad.

=== Gay press ===
The book was supported by gay and AIDS activists and reviewers. ACT UP founder Larry Kramer called Sexual Ecology "one of the most important books ever written for and about gay men." Charles Silverstein, co-author of The Joy of Gay Sex, called it "the most important gay book of the 90s." Gay Men’s Health Crisis co-founder Lawrence D. Mass called Sexual Ecology "The most important book in the history of the gay community and AIDS." Pioneering AIDS activist and GMHC co-founder Rodger McFarlane wrote for POZ

Sexual Ecology blows the lid off the epidemiological closet ... Whatever the complexity of the task, the first step must be an honest assessment of how we got into this mess and what each of us can do to end it. Rotello delivers that in spades. I dreaded reading Sexual Ecology because I didn’t want to be scolded about my sex life. What I discovered was one of the seminal works of the plague years. It belongs on the shelf next to And the Band Played On and Reports from the Holocaust. This is no sermon on unbridled libido. It’s a monumental testament of love for which we should thank the author.

Other gay writers disagreed. In Out magazine, Richard Goldstein wrote that Sexual Ecology "urges gay men to devise alternatives to promiscuity while haranguing them for failing to be restrained. It preaches communal solidarity while demonizing those who dissent. It offers a message of empathy laced with contempt."

In a rebuttal to Sexual Ecology, AIDS activist Jim Eigo wrote that the book's "central argument" is that gay men should "...abandon current safer sex strategies (primary among them the condom code) and adopt serial monogamy as a communal norm." Comparing Rotello to right-wingers such as Jesse Helms and Pat Buchanan, Eigo called the concept of holistic prevention "a quirky regurgitation of Judeo-Christian doctrine" and "breathtakingly simpleminded ... Reading it all I kept wondering, in what way would crabbed monogamy be more holistic than loving, healthy promiscuity?"

In The Village Voice, Mark Schoofs wrote: "... Rotello presents an ugly distortion of gay history and life." Schoofs disputed Rotello's underlying contention that HIV prevention was failing: "Fortunately, prevention programs are working. As the Centers for Disease Control's Scott Holmberg recently told me, 'There have been huge, marked behavior changes in every index of gay male behavior: entering monogamous relationships, reducing partners, using condoms.'" He criticized Rotello's contention that legalizing gay marriage might help to lower the contact rate: "Maybe, but legalizing gay marriage won't halt the homophobia that deforms gay kids ... Just below the book's surface runs the idea that if we remade gay culture in a straight image we would conquer HIV. However, the first principle of behavior change is not to impose outside norms but to build on indigenous ones." Schoofs continued

Rotello's browbeating rhetoric, his revision of AIDS-prevention history, and his distortion of gay life add up to more than "mere" matters of style, or politics, or even truth ... Sexual Ecology could have helped lift gay men to a new understanding of how our lives interconnect. But Rotello has polluted his own grand metaphor and made it toxic. Ecology reads all too much like another indictment of gay men: We have done almost nothing right. This does not stand up to the historical record, nor will it stand up to the life experiences of most gay readers.

=== Sex Panic! ===
The activist group Sex Panic! was formed in New York City several weeks after the publication of Sexual Ecology, in part to rebut the book. In a Lingua Franca interview, Sex Panic! founding members Gregg Gonsalves and Michael Warner described how the group was born during a support-group meeting of HIV-positive men:

"We had our support group," Gonsalves says, "and at the end, it moved to talking about Gabriel Rotello's new book, and we all got sort of exercised about it." "We were just sitting around and talking about how depressing it was that we kept hearing these stories about bars being closed," says Warner. "And then we kept turning to the gay press, and instead of seeing coverage about this or resistance to it, we would see these reactionary screeds by Rotello and [gay writer Michelangelo] Signorile." Says Gonsalves, "And we thought, why don't we do something about this?" Gonsalves recruited among grassroots activists, and Warner, along with art critic Douglas Crimp recruited scholars. About fifty people showed up at the first Sex Panic organizational meeting in late May.

Sex Panic!'s name was derived from the work of gay historian Allan Bérubé, who described historical "sex panics" as "moral crusades that lead to crackdowns on sexual outsiders." Gonsalves and Warner believed that Sexual Ecology and other works by gay writers such as Michelangelo Signorile, Larry Kramer, and Andrew Sullivan were encouraging a governmental backlash against gay sexual freedom and contributing to a crackdown on New York City gay bars and sexual venues.

Lingua Franca described a 1997 New York teach-in held by Sex Panic!:

... The crowd rewards anyone who mentions Rotello, Signorile, Kramer, or Sullivan with hisses, boos, and laughs. The men and women here tonight feel sure of their enemies, and as the evening advances, these enemies condense into one creature, a hyphenated neoconservative bogeyman named Rotello-Signorile-Kramer-Sullivan.

In Queer Political Performance and Protest, Benjamin Shepard wrote that Rotello, Signorile, Kramer and Sullivan came to be known as

...the Gang of Four of the late 90s panic within the GLBT community ... they narrated gay life from an apologist perspective, describing AIDS as a punishment for queer sexuality and asking good gays to divorce themselves from their alter ego, "the promiscuous queer" ... The new sex wars were upon us.

Sex Panic! began a campaign of articles, posters, workshops and teach-ins to advance its views, which included discrediting Sexual Ecology as homophobic, assimilationist, and scientifically inaccurate. Referring to Rotello and others, a flyer for a New York teach-in was headlined "DANGER! ASSAULT! TURDZ!". Sex Panic! held a national summit in San Diego in November 1997, much of which focused on combating and discrediting Sexual Ecology. Sex Panic! was active for two years, defending public sex and criticizing developments such as the gentrification of New York's Times Square.

Sex Panic!'s critical stance on Sexual Ecology received widespread media attention. According to an article in The New York Times, "The volleying [sic] has deeply divided the gay intelligentsia. For the first time since the publication in 1987 of And The Band Played On by Randy Shilts, there is an open debate among homosexuals about promiscuity's role in AIDS." The article cited Michael Warner as saying that "... promiscuous sex is the essence of gay liberation, and that any attempt to fight AIDS by changing the culture is doomed. 'It is an absurd fantasy to expect gay men to live without a sexual culture when we have almost nothing else that brings us together', Mr. Warner said." Rotello responded to Sex Panic!'s critique of Sexual Ecology with an open letter to the group which was widely reprinted in the gay press.

== Legacy ==
Rotello made a number of warnings and predictions in Sexual Ecology, many of which have been prescient. He predicted that as new drugs effectively treated HIV, fear would abate and condom use would probably diminish; treatment could become a form of prevention by lowering group infectivity. Rotello warned that if gay men responded to the availability of treatment by increasing unsafe sex and increasing multipartnerism - the phenomenon of risk compensation - "the decline in infectivity could easily be outbalanced by a rise in the unsafe contact rate", continuing the epidemic.

He warned that without lowering the contact rate, gay men would maintain the highest incidence of STDs in the US. Rotello was concerned that such patterns of behavior would prompt the emergence of novel STD pathogens and drug-resistant forms of established pathogens. He also predicted that as HIV continued to spread among gay men, it might mutate into increasingly virulent or drug-resistant strains. Studies indicate that this is occurring, but has not reached levels which would alter the epidemic's trajectory. Rotello predicted that as gay men continued to transmit HIV despite knowledge of how not to, mainstream society might withdraw some of its support for gay rights. Polls indicate that public belief that AIDS is the nation's "most urgent health problem" has declined from 38 percent to seven percent since Sexual Ecology was published, and support for gay rights is at an all-time high.

The debate over Sexual Ecology has continued. It has been discussed in over 200 subsequent books and hundreds of articles and scholarly papers on subjects including epidemiology, sociology, AIDS, gay history, psychology, spirituality, ecology, and sexuality. Much of the discussion echoes the original debate, with some authors describing it as a key text on gay men and AIDS and others calling it assimilationist, inaccurate or homophobic. The Publishing Triangle, an American association of LGBT publishing professionals, included Sexual Ecology on its list of 100 Best Gay and Lesbian Non-Fiction Books in 2004.

== See also ==
- Plagues and Peoples by William McNeill
- Randy Shilts
- The Trouble with Normal by Michael Warner
