= David B. Feinberg =

American novelist (1956–1994)

David Barish Feinberg
- Born: November 25, 1956; Lynn, Massachusetts, U.S.
- Died: November 2, 1994 (aged 37); Manhattan, New York City, New York, U.S.
- Education: Massachusetts Institute of Technology; New York University
- Occupations: Writer; AIDS activist Novelist; Essayist
- Notable work: Eighty-Sixed; Spontaneous Combustion; Queer and Loathing: Rants and Raves of a Raging AIDS Clone
- Awards: Lambda Literary Award for Gay Men's Fiction; Stonewall Book Award; American Library Association Gay and Lesbian Book Award

David Barish Feinberg (November 25, 1956 – November 2, 1994) was an American writer and AIDS activist.

== Biography ==
=== Early life ===
Born in Lynn, Massachusetts to Jewish parents, Feinberg grew up in Syracuse, New York. He attended the Massachusetts Institute of Technology, majoring in mathematics and studying creative writing with novelist John Hersey, graduating in 1977. He subsequently worked as a computer programmer for the Modern Language Association of America (MLA) and also pursued a master's degree in linguistics at New York University. He completed his first novel, Calculus, in 1979, although it has never been published. Feinberg himself described the novel as "godawful", telling one interviewer that it was a novel that "only an MIT math major could have written".

In the early 1980s, he joined a gay men's writing group, eventually creating the character B. J. Rosenthal, a young gay Jewish man, much like Feinberg himself who became the central character in virtually all of Feinberg's later writing. He contributed a humour column to the gay magazine Mandate in 1986 and 1987, which in turn led to his first book deal. The novel Eighty-Sixed was published in 1989 and won Feinberg the Lambda Literary Award for Gay Men's Fiction, the Stonewall Award for Literature, and the American Library Association Gay/Lesbian Award for Fiction. It was also cited by the Books to Remember Committee of the New York Public Library.

Feinberg tested positive for HIV in 1987, and joined the activist organization ACT UP. He participated in ACT UP demonstrations including Stop the Church. In 1991, he published his second novel, a sequel to Eighty-Sixed entitled Spontaneous Combustion, a selection of both the Book of the Month Club and the Quality Paperback Book Club. For the next few years, Feinberg balanced writing and political activism with working full-time. Stories, articles, and reviews by him appeared in The New York Times Book Review, The Advocate, Details, OutWeek, Tribe, New York Quarterly, QW, Out, The Body Positive, Gay Community News, Art & Understanding, The James White Review, Diseased Pariah News, Poz, and both Men on Men 2: Best New Gay Fiction and Men on Men 4.

=== Death ===
In July 1994, failing health led him to take disability leave. That fall, he was admitted to St. Vincent's Hospital Manhattan, which was, until it closed, the flagship hospital of the Saint Vincent's Catholic Medical Centers located in Greenwich Village, where he died early in November at the age of 37. Even while hospitalized, he continued to write. His final book, a collection of essays called Queer and Loathing: Rants and Raves of a Raging AIDS Clone, was published shortly before his death.

== Body of work ==
B. J. Rosenthal, the main character of Feinberg's first two published books and a wise-mouthed, perpetually libidinous urbanite, was something of an alter ego for his creator. "He and I aren't the same person exactly," Feinberg told New York Newsday in 1992. "I'd say he's 60 to 70 percent me. We're both gay, of course, and HIV-positive. But...I write novels, and he doesn't. And while he's more well-endowed, I'm a better lover."

Queer and Loathing, by contrast, was "as close to the truth as I can get," as Feinberg wrote in the book's introduction. The essays were his attempt "to capture what is to me a painfully obvious reality that is rarely written about: what it is like to be HIV-positive in the 90s; what it is like to outlive one therapist, two dentists, two doctors, and one gastroenterologist."

"He exemplified the best of the gay humor we use to endure impossible situations," said Ed Iwanicki, Feinberg's editor at Viking Penguin. "No one was able to find that humor in the most dire situations as well as he was."

"It was so biting and so satirical, and it had a very New York edge," said author Jameson Currier, who knew Feinberg as a fellow member of ACT UP. "He was the first to write in that style about AIDS, and he created quite a bit of controversy. He broke a lot of ground in that respect."

== Legacy and influence ==
Feinberg's voice reading from Queer and Loathing was used in the 1995 PBS series Positive: Life with HIV in 1995.

Feinberg's papers are held by the New York Public Library's Manuscripts and Archives Division.

In May 2022, the musical Eighty-Sixed, based on Feinberg's novel, with book by Jeremy J. King and music and lyrics by Sam Salmond, had its world premiere at the Diversionary Theater in San Diego.

Reviewers suggest that the character Zach in John Weir's 2006 novel What I Did Wrong is based on Feinberg, who was a friend of Weir.

Feinberg is mentioned by several interviewees of the ACT UP Oral History Project.

In the 2008 comedy film Harold & Kumar Escape from Guantanamo Bay, Kumar recites the poem "The Square Root of Three" in order to win back his ex-girlfriend Vanessa. Although often attributed to Feinberg, the poem was written by a computer science professor at Carnegie Mellon University also named David Feinberg.
