= Pride Divide =

- Directed by: Paris Poirier
- Produced by: Karen Kiss
- Edited by: Mary Beth Bresoulin
- Release date: June 21, 1997
- Running time: 57 minutes
- Country: United States
- Language: English

Pride Divide is a 1997 documentary film directed by Paris Poirier. It examines the issues within the LGBT community relating to apparent divisions between lesbians and gay men.

== Participants ==
- Joan Jett Blakk
- Kate Clinton
- Martin Duberman
- Lillian Faderman
- Barbara Gittings
- Michael Goff
- Harry Hay
- Simon LeVay
- JoAnn Loulan
- Michael Musto
- Joan Nestle
- Ann Northropp
- Camille Paglia
- Sarah Pettit
- Catherine Saalfield
- Sarah Schulman
- Michelangelo Signorile
- Rose Troche

== Reception ==
Pride Divide won the aGLIFF Award at the 1997 Austin Gay & Lesbian International Film Festival. In 1999, it won the Gold Apple award from the National Educational Media Network. Writing for Variety, Ken Eisner called the film brave and entertaining.
