= Sex Panic! =

Sex Panic!, sometimes rendered SexPanic! or Sex Panic, was a sexual activism group founded in New York City in 1997. The group characterized itself as a "pro-queer, pro-feminist, anti-racist direct action group" campaigning for sexual freedom in the age of AIDS. It was founded to oppose both mainstream political measures to control sex, and elements within the gay community who advocated same-sex marriage and the restriction of public sexual culture as solutions to the HIV crisis. The group has been depicted as a faction in a gay "culture war" of the late 20th and early 21st centuries.

Sex Panic!'s actions and attitudes were criticized as immature and even fanatical by its opponents, but other commentators called the group a vital component of grassroots gay activism that resisted gay marginalization and countered forced conformity to social norms.

== Origins ==
According to founder member Christopher Murray, in a 1997 letter to The New York Times, Sex Panic! was formed by six HIV-positive gay men opposed to a "gay neo-conservative movement" and to the closure of gay venues around New York.

The closure of gay venues stemmed from the urban rezoning policies of New York City mayor Rudolph Giuliani's administration. Giuliani had passed laws that made it harder for sex-related businesses to operate in central city areas, forcing many to close or relocate to the waterfront. These policies, Sex Panic! founder Michael Warner wrote, served to stigmatize sex and sexuality in ways that had negative consequences for public health efforts to combat HIV and AIDS. Reducing the availability and visibility of venues for sex did not, Warner argued, make people safer; on the contrary it reduced the number of public sites where safer sex messages could be broadcast and gay men encouraged to consider their sexual health honestly, critically, and without the confusion and misinformation fostered by a culture of shame.

As well as mainstream politics, the group opposed the anti-promiscuity arguments of prominent gay rights campaigners Larry Kramer, Andrew Sullivan, Michelangelo Signorile, and Gabriel Rotello. Sullivan's 1995 book Virtually Normal: An Argument About Homosexuality had called for the abandonment of radical gay identity politics in favor of campaigning for the right to marry, which he presented as the highest social value attainable and the token of a maturity and moral responsibility the gay movement had lacked. Sullivan's arguments for marriage included the assertion that it was a good defense against the spread of HIV and AIDS; Rotello argued similarly that these diseases could not be eradicated so long as a 'core group' of gay men participated in risky sex. Marriage, Rotello suggested in his 1997 book Sexual Ecology, was a powerful incentive to behavior less likely to spread disease, while exclusion from the benefits it offered created an equally powerful stigma. These views, the founders of Sex Panic! argued, supported a mainstream political culture that demonized gay people and portrayed gay sex in general, rather than unsafe sex in particular, as a vector of disease.

=== Name ===
The organization's name references a concept used by historians to describe repressive measures against sex in the name of the public good; 'sex panics' in this sense have been documented since at least the nineteenth century. A Gay City News journalist, evaluating the group's role in the history of sex scandals through the 1980s, 1990s, and 2000s, described the choice of name as an act of self-empowerment.

=== Membership ===
Founder and early members of Sex Panic! included historian Allan Bérubé, Christopher Murray, art historian Douglas Crimp, Columbia Law School professor Kendall Thomas, Rutgers University English professor Michael Warner, research activist Greg Gonsalves, and scientific artist Dennis Davidson. Feminist authors Eva Pendleton, Jane Goldschmidt of the National Gay and Lesbian Task Force, and literary critic Ann Pellegrini were also early members.

== Aims and activities ==
Members Eva Pendleton and Jane Goldschmidt articulated Sex Panic!'s goals in 1998:

Our multi-issue agenda aims to defend public sexual culture and safer sex in New York City from police crackdowns, public stigma, and morality crusades. We are committed to HIV prevention through safer sex, sexual self-determination for all people, and democratic urban space.

— Pendleton and Goldschmidt, Harvard Gay and Lesbian Review

The group argued that the best response to sexual health crisis was to promote safer sex, and argued that approaches that contradicted the 'condom code' - the advocacy of barrier methods as the only sure protection - actually undermined efforts to curb the crisis by encouraging carelessness and hypocrisy. This opposed the group to the arguments of Rotello, Signorile, and others, who said that the spread of the disease was best contained by a "new maturity" of marriage and monogamy, sex with only one partner, and the deliberate use of shame to discourage participation in potentially risky sex. Such an approach, Sex Panic! argued, was either naive or deliberately disingenuous. Rather than demonizing sex with multiple partners, Sex Panic! stressed a need to counteract the effects of shame. They argued that it was absurd and repressive to insist that everyone adopt what Warner called a "Fifties gay life" of monogamy, to pretend that sex in private was somehow necessarily safer than sex in public, and outright dangerous to create a situation that bred ignorance about safer sex methods, despair over the possibilities for protecting oneself, and a resulting increase in infection rates. Founding member Thomas pointed out that it was not gay sex or promiscuous sex that spread HIV, but unsafe sex.

Some of the group's tactics were deliberately eye-catching. The flyer for one 1997 event was headlined "DANGER! ASSAULT! TURDZ!", the latter a reference to Signorile, Rotello, Kramer, and Sullivan. Other activities included demonstrating alongside ACT UP against the GMHC's plans to identify seropositive patients by name in public HIV status reporting, rather than the anonymized reporting the group favored.

Other measures were more conventional. In June 1997 the group conducted teach-ins at New York's Lesbian and Gay Community Services Center. The group also held a November 1997 summit in San Diego, California, where a series of lectures and workshops discussed what the group called an "emerging culture war" within the gay community and sought to forge alliances between gay men and other marginalized groups. At the conference, founder Eric Rofes urged attendees to start grassroots movements of their own to combat the repression of sexual minorities. The outspoken methods of Sex Panic!, he argued, were indispensable, since the movement they fought worked by means of marginalization, silencing, and oppression. To be 'neutral' in the face of public discourses that sought to shame and marginalize gay communities, Rofes argued, was to be complicit in that shaming and marginalization.

== Criticism ==
Larry Kramer, an overt target of the group's campaigns, published an editorial piece in The New York Times criticizing the group's tactics and goals. Sex Panic!, Kramer said, was "on the way to convincing much of America that all gay men are back to pre-AIDS self-destructive behavior that will wind up costing the taxpayer a lot of extra money."

Other commentators accused Sex Panic! of irresponsibility in the face of the HIV epidemic. David Dalton, in the San Francisco Examiner, said the group was telling young men that "a sex act... is worth more than your life." In Salon, David Horowitz charged Sex Panic! with "intellectual fascism and sexual fanaticism" over their defence of sex clubs, which he characterized as the "death camps of the current contagion." The group's insistence that a gay public sexual culture continue in the face of the epidemic was, in Horowitz's view, "homicidal", and its membership composed of "sexual extremists" cloistered in complicit universities. Sex Panic! member Douglas Crimp rebutted the charges that this was a mere intellectual exercise. Mainstream venues where such debate took place, he argued, were dominated by the group's opponents and had failed to engage with queer theory, so necessarily saw the group's members as fringe extremists. He argued too that the very life-and-death nature of the AIDS crisis made the group's purpose political, rather than academic, rejecting the claim that the group's insistence on the complexity of the issues it addressed was "dangerous relativism".

Others were sympathetic to parts of Sex Panic!'s manifesto but opposed to certain particulars. David Salyer in Survival News, a journal of the AIDS Survival Project, applauded the group's demands for an end to discrimination and greater promotion of safer sex messages, but objected to the emphasis the group placed on public sex. Activist John-Manuel Andriote also criticized Sex Panic!'s assertion that public, visible, anonymous sex was necessarily a cornerstone of gay experience. Michael Warner had told The New York Times that "It is an absurd fantasy to expect gay men to live without a sexual culture when we have almost nothing else that brings us together". Andriote responded that the AIDS crisis itself had been an alternative community-forming experience for gays and lesbians, who cooperated to support one another and campaign for awareness. Through the crisis, Andriote said, gay men had acquired a broader common experience than "a priapic brotherhood of sexual rebellion", offering an alternative grounds for a group politics of identity.

Sex Panic! members accused their opponents of mischaracterizing their positions. Founder member Kendall Thomas objected to a New York Times piece claiming the group saw "promiscuous sex" as the "essence of gay liberation"; the newspaper printed an amendment, stating Thomas's view to be that "any attempt to fight AIDS by demonizinging [sic] the culture of sexual freedom is doomed".

Tim Dean called the group's criticism of Rotello and Signorile "utterly confused and defensive", but noted its significance in re-energizing AIDS debates and reviving the political argument over gay assimilation. Craig Rimmerman similarly praised the group's "invaluable contribution" to sustaining gay and lesbian grassroots activism and fighting "normalizing tendencies" in public discourse about sexual health.

== See also ==
- HIV/AIDS in the United States
- Same-sex marriage in New York
