= OutWeek =

American LGBT magazine

- Categories: Gay news periodical
- Frequency: Weekly
- First issue: June 26, 1989
- Final issue: June 1991
- Country: United States
- Language: English

OutWeek was a gay and lesbian weekly news magazine published in New York City from 1989 to 1991. During its two-year existence, OutWeek was one of the leading voices of AIDS activism and was a leading voice in embracing "outing" as a tactic to raise awareness for AIDS activism.

== Founding ==
OutWeek was originally conceived by musician and producer Gabriel Rotello. As a member of the activist group ACT UP, Rotello felt that New York needed a publication that would represent ACT UP's new, more radical approach to activism.

At the same time, businessman and ACT UP member Kendall Morrison was planning to start a New York magazine that would provide a venue for advertising his popular gay phone sex businesses. Although neither Rotello nor Morrison had any experience in journalism, the two decided to team up, with Morrison acting as publisher and Rotello as editor-in-chief.

From its first issue on June 26, 1989, OutWeek attracted considerable attention and the magazine repeatedly broke major stories both in New York and nationally.

== Major articles ==
In the January 21, 1990, issue, Outweek covered the Covenant House sex scandal and had an exclusive interview with Father Bruce Ritter's main accuser, Kevin Kite. Ritter was accused of sexual abuse and financial misconduct during his time as the head of Covenant House, a "faith based social service organization".

Also in that issue, OutWeek took part in a major local controversy by revealing that the newly appointed health commissioner of New York City, Woodrow A. Myers, advocated the "mandatory name reporting, contact tracing and quarantining" of people with AIDS. As New York's Mayor David Dinkins appointed Meyers, the subsequent controversy impacted him and pitted his gay supporters against his black supporters, leading The New York Times to call the dispute "by far the most bitter" of the Dinkins administration.

By repeatedly breaking major stories, and through its intense coverage of the AIDS crisis, OutWeek became a significant journalistic presence in New York.

== Outing controversy ==
Cover of the OutWeek issue outing Malcolm Forbes

OutWeek is probably best remembered for sparking the "outing" controversy. This began in Michelangelo Signorile's "GossipWatch" columns, in which the fiery writer railed against then-closeted public figures like David Geffen and Liz Smith for what he considered their complicity in a culture of silence around AIDS and gay rights.

Outing in this context refers to the practice of revealing the sexual orientation of another person without permission. The new use of this term was popularized in 1990 by Time magazine in an article titled "Forcing Gays Out of the Closet" which defined outing as "the intentional exposure of secret gays by other gays". Activists employed the use of outing in response to the silence or lack of support of public figures in regards to the AIDS epidemic with the goal of making the people they outed more supportive of the movement.

On the death of Malcolm Forbes, tycoon, multimillionaire, and editor in chief of Forbes magazine, in early 1990, OutWeek pushed the issue of outing to the limit by publishing a cover story "The Secret Gay Life of Malcolm Forbes". This March 18, 1990, issue of OutWeek included articles about Forbes titled "Claiming Forbes for the Gay Nation", "The Other Side of Malcolm", and "Working in the Capitalist Closet". This story became a media sensation and prompted significant debates over the practice of outing. Major news sources that discussed this controversy included the Sun Sentinel, the Los Angeles Times, and The Washington Post. In their book Outing: Shattering the Conspiracy of Silence, Warren Johansson and William A. Percy state that the editorial "Claiming Forbes for the Gay Nation" was "the manifesto of outing" and argue that "OutWeek's bold move marked a new phase in the struggle to tear down the closet door."

Besides full-fledged exposés, OutWeek practiced outing through Michelangelo Signorile's "Peek-A-Boo" boxes which simply contained names of individuals and left the rest up to the reader's interpretation. The "Peek-A-Boo" box in the August 1, 1989, issue had sixty-six names including Michael Jackson, Robert Downey Jr., Olivia Newton-John, and John Travolta.

Ironically, OutWeek outed only a handful of public figures during its existence, mostly in Signorile's column. However, its vigorous defense of the idea that the media should treat the homosexuality of public figures the way it treats any other aspect of their private lives galvanized supporters, outraged opponents and forever stamped the magazine as the place where outing began.

== Closing ==
In June 1991 it published its last edition, almost two years after it first appeared. It published 105 issues in all, and The New York Times reported OutWeek's circulation at between 30,000 and 40,000 copies. Despite its journalistic awards and avid readership, OutWeek struggled to make a profit. According to The New York Times, the closing was the result of financial problems and fighting within the leadership.

In its article on the demise of Outweek, The New York Times noted that "Outweek established itself from the start as the most progressive of the gay publications. Its controversial practice of 'outing'—exposing public figures who are gay and lesbian—and its support of ACT UP and Queer Nation, two activist gay organizations, brought it national notoriety.""

== Impact ==
Despite its brief existence, OutWeek left a significant legacy in many areas.

The magazine's constant presence in the general media, and its sparking of repeated controversies, helped bring gay and AIDS issues into the mainstream.

Within the gay press, OutWeek caused a major shakeup. The Advocate, the nation's oldest gay publication, saw its circulation decline relative to OutWeek. The result was a major revamp of the magazine. In 1990, The Advocate became a "gay and lesbian" publication for the first time, instead of just a magazine for gay men, and began to focus far more on politics and AIDS activism. Many other gay and lesbian publications became far feistier, and it is sometimes said that OutWeek pioneered a "new gay journalism".

Outing has become relatively mainstream, and the journalistic rules regarding the disclosure of the sexual orientation of public figures is now largely in keeping with OutWeek's original goals. For example, when publishing mogul Jann Wenner left his wife in the late 1990s, The Wall Street Journal reported on its front page - and without Wenner's permission - that he had begun a relationship with a younger man.

OutWeek also stirred significant controversy by its use of the term "queer" as an inclusive and radical way to describe gay men, lesbians, bisexuals and transgender people. The term was used several times in the first issue of OutWeek and in many of the following issues. The use of the word queer in this way is now relatively common, appearing in the titles of TV shows like Queer as Folk and Queer Eye for the Straight Guy.

OutWeek also made inroads in the recognition of the LGBTQ community as a powerful consumer base when advertising executive Colleen Mangan convinced Michel Roux, president and CEO of Carillon Importers to commit to a year-long contract for Absolut Vodka to appear on the back cover of OutWeek on a biweekly basis. Although Absolut had previously appeared in The Advocate, the contract with OutWeek is believed to be the first ongoing and regularly scheduled contract for a major brand to advertise in gay media.

In regards to its impact, Time magazine wrote: "The magazine had earned recognition for its reporting on AIDS, homophobic assaults and gay politics, but its greatest success was in shaking up its competitors by challenging their brand of gay activism with a more militant stance." The New York Times had a similar stance, stating that "OutWeek gave voice to a new generation of AIDS activists who had not previously had a public voice and provided a rallying point for the more militant members of the gay community."

== Staff ==
During OutWeek's existence, Rotello assembled a staff of young writers and editors. For many it was their first job in journalism, yet a large number went on to significant careers.

Michelangelo Signorile became a well-known columnist, lecturer and author (Queer in America, Outing Yourself), and is now a popular talk-radio host on Sirius OutQ.

Arts editor Sarah Pettit became the executive editor of Out magazine, then editor-in-chief, and then the arts editor of Newsweek, before her death from cancer in 2003.

Copy editor Walter Armstrong became the editor-in-chief of POZ magazine.

Staffers Dale Peck, Karl Soehnlein and Jim Provenzano all became well-known novelists.

Columnist Michael Goff founded Out magazine and was its first editor and president. He later became general manager of Microsoft's MSN, and Dan Gillmor's partner in early citizen journalism effort, Bayosphere.

Staffer Victoria Starr became an author and the biographer of k.d. lang.

Production Manager Diana Osterfeld worked in desktop publishing (both creating magazines and training others at IMAGE Inc.) for many years before returning for a master's degree in architecture at University of Texas at Austin. She is now in the process of becoming a licensed architect.

Reporter David Kirby became a New York Times reporter and author of a best-selling exposé on the alleged relationship between mercury and autism, Evidence of Harm.

Columnist James St. James wrote the memoir Disco Bloodbath, later made into a 1998 documentary and a 2003 feature film starring Macaulay Culkin, both called Party Monster.

Advertising executives Colleen Mangan and Troy Masters founded the weekly QW Magazine, which, on the verge of becoming profitable, ceased operations when CEO and chief investor William (Bill) Chafin died of AIDS. Masters went on to found the New York weekly Gay City News and became its publisher, and is now publisher of the Los Angeles Blade. Mangan became an expert in the field of desktop publishing and went on to become an information architect and usability specialist as the internet gained prevalence.

Columnist Maria Maggenti is an independent film director (The Incredibly True Adventures of 2 Girls in Love; Puccini for Beginners).

Rotello himself became the first openly gay columnist for a major newspaper (New York Newsday), later authored the best selling book Sexual Ecology, and is now a TV documentary producer/director for HBO, Bravo and other networks.
