= The Trouble with Normal =

The Trouble with Normal may refer to:

- The Trouble with Normal (album), a 1983 album by Bruce Cockburn
- The Trouble with Normal (book), a 1999 non-fiction book by Michael Warner
- The Trouble with Normal (TV series), a short-lived 2000 American television series
