= Gabriel Rotello =

American musician, writer and filmmaker (born 1963)

Gabriel Rotello (born February 9, 1953) is an American musician, writer and filmmaker. He created New York's Downtown Divas revues in the 1980s, was the co-founder and editor-in-chief of OutWeek magazine, became the first openly gay columnist at a major American newspaper, New York Newsday, and authored the book Sexual Ecology. He now makes documentaries for HBO, The History Channel and other networks.

== Biography ==
=== Early life ===
Gabriel Rotello was born and raised in Danbury, Connecticut, and attended Knox College and Carlton College. He was in the first group of American exchange students to live and study in Kathmandu, Nepal. After graduating Rotello became a New York City keyboard player, arranger and music director. In 1979 he co-founded the underground band Brenda and the Realtones, whose story was recounted in the off-Broadway show Endangered Species in 1997.

In the 1980s, as music director of The Realtones he backed artists such as Ronnie Spector, Darlene Love, Solomon Burke, Rufus Thomas and many others. In the mid-1980s he produced a series of music revues at The Limelight, The Palladium and The Saint under the general name Downtown Dukes and Divas. Among his collaborators were the Uptown Horns, David Johansen, Cherry Vanilla, Johnny Thunders, the Lady Bunny, Holly Woodlawn, Joey Arias, David Peaston, Taylor Mead, Sylvain Sylvain, Jackie Curtis, Dean Johnson, Michael Musto, Fenton Bailey and Randy Barbato of the Fabulous Pop Tarts and many others. Rotello's life and productions during this period were frequently filmed by videographer Nelson Sullivan, and are now part of Sullivan's archive of downtown life in the 1980s.

=== AIDS activism and OutWeek ===
In 1988 Rotello joined the AIDS activist group ACT UP and served on its fundraising committee. In 1989 he co-founded OutWeek magazine with businessman Kendall Morrison and became its editor-in-chief. The New York Times called OutWeek "the most progressive of the gay publications", and Time magazine wrote that "its greatest success was in shaking up its competitors by challenging their brand of gay activism with a more militant stance."

Rotello and OutWeek became controversial for the practice of outing, which originated at OutWeek, and for promoting the word queer as a catch-all phrase for sexual minorities. As an investigative reporter Rotello helped break numerous stories such as the Covenant House scandal and the Woody Myers affair, which The New York Times called "the most bitter dispute of the Dinkins administration". Many of the young staffers Rotello hired at OutWeek went on to become well-known figures in gay and lesbian writing, publishing and other fields, including Michelangelo Signorile, Sarah Pettit, Dale Peck, Jim Provenzano, K. M. Soehnlein and James St. James.

=== New York Newsday ===
Rotello left OutWeek shortly before it folded in 1991 and was hired as a columnist by New York Newsday, becoming the first openly gay man to become a columnist at a major American newspaper. For his weekly columns, which explored gay life, homophobia and the AIDS epidemic, he received the GLAAD Award as Outstanding Journalist in 1995. After New York Newsday folded he became a columnist for The Advocate and wrote for the Village Voice, The New Scientist, Out, The Nation and The New York Times.

=== Sexual Ecology ===
In 1997 Rotello published Sexual Ecology: AIDS and the Destiny of Gay Men (Dutton). Its investigation of why HIV continues to infect large numbers of gay men, and its conclusion that partner reduction must be added to the strategy of condoms to bring new infections down, ignited a major debate and Sexual Ecology became one of the most controversial gay books of its generation. It has been called "a remarkable book ... a breath of fresh air in the growing litany about the AIDS epidemic" (The New Scientist), "the Silent Spring of the AIDS epidemic (Boston Globe) and "the most important book about gay men and AIDS since And the Band Played On (The Nation). But it was also criticized for offering "a message of empathy laced with contempt" (Out), and as "an ugly distortion of gay life" (The Village Voice).

In 1998 Rotello co-wrote My Life and the Paradise Garage with Mel Cheren, a memoir about the legendary gay disco Paradise Garage, its pioneering DJ Larry Levan and the impact of AIDS on a generation of gay men.

=== TV and film ===
In 1998 Rotello moved to Los Angeles and began making documentaries exploring American life and popular culture with World of Wonder founders Fenton Bailey and Randy Barbato. Their first collaboration, the documentary Party Monster, centered on New York's downtown nightclub scene, a world which Rotello, Bailey and Barbato knew from their earlier days as musicians. Their next feature, The Eyes of Tammy Faye, is on Current TV's list of 50 Documentaries to See Before You Die.

Rotello's work with Bailey and Barbato includes a number of high-profile documentaries and documentary series including AMC's Hollywood Fashion Machine, HBO's Hidden Führer: Debating the Enigma of Hitler's Sexuality; HBO's Monica in Black and White, Bravo's Reality of Reality, AMC's Movies That Shook the World, and AMC's Out of the Closet/Off The Screen: The William Haines Story, as well as reality shows such as RuPaul's Drag Race. Their 2010 HBO film The Strange History of Don't Ask Don't Tell was nominated for an Emmy Award and a GLAAD Award.

Rotello currently makes science and history documentaries with Flight 33 Productions for the History Channel, Discovery Channel and National Geographic Channel, including series such as The Universe, Life After People, Big History and America's Secret Slang.
