= Henry Scott (journalist) =

Hank Scott
- Born: Henry E Scott; August 9, 1951 (age 75)
- Education: University of North Carolina at Chapel Hill
- Occupations: author, journalist, media business executive

Henry E. "Hank" Scott (born August 9, 1951) is a media business executive, author, and journalist. He oversaw the launch of the The New York Times's first online edition, served as the editorial director for Out Magazine, and helped launch the daily newspaper Metro New York. He is also the author of three books.

== Early life and education ==
Scott was born in 1951 in Fayetteville, North Carolina, and grew up there. He earned a bachelor's degree in political science from the University of North Carolina at Chapel Hill in 1972.

== Career ==
=== The New York Times Company ===
Scott joined The New York Times in 1989. He served as managing director for research and marketing planning and, from 1993 to 1995, as vice president for new media and new product development in the paper's Information Services Division.

In that role he oversaw the launch of @times, the paper's first online edition, in partnership with America Online. Launched in May 1994 on the AOL platform, @times offered a selection of Times articles, film reviews, and business and cultural coverage; the service was initially available only to AOL's roughly four million subscribers. Scott has said the idea came from his own experience as an AOL user: "I was a pretty avid user of America Online and I had hit on the idea of how cool it would be to have a site online for the New York Times."

=== Gansevoort Media and consulting ===
Scott left The Times in 1995 to form Gansevoort Media, a media consulting firm. After selling the group, he provided similar services through the interMediator Group, which was later rebranded as Mister Media Maven.

=== Out Magazine ===
In January 1996, Scott became president and editorial director of Out magazine, where he launched an auxiliary publication titled HIV Plus. Scott made somewhat controversial changes to Out's staffing and content to concentrate the magazine's focus on the lifestyle of gay men rather than lesbians and to concentrate its circulation on major metropolitan areas likely to attract major advertisers. His refusal to renew the contract of Sarah Pettit, a lesbian who had been the magazine's editor, sparked controversy. Scott replaced her with James Collard, a gay man who was editor of the U.K.'s Attitude, another publication for gay men. Collard left after one year.

=== Metro New York ===
Scott was hired in 2002 to advise London-based Metro International on the launch of Metro New York, a 330,000-circulation free daily newspaper published in New York City. Scott served as Metro's managing director, publisher, and strategic business advisor until 2006.

=== Creative Loafing ===
In February 2010 Scott joined Creative Loafing as vice president and chief marketing officer, and was appointed publisher of Creative Loafing Atlanta in May of that year, before stepping down in December 2010.

== Books ==
Scott wrote Shocking True Story, the Rise and Fall of Confidential, America's Most Scandalous Scandal Magazine, which was reviewed in the Journal of Magazine & New Media Research; Scott was also interviewed about the book by The Wall Street Journal and on NPR's Fresh Air. In addition, he authored two self-published works, London Comfort: From Hollywood to the White House, an American Idol's Dangerous Real World Adventure, and Want to Launch a Local News Website?.
