= BuzzFeed News =

Defunct American news website

- Buzzfeed News website on July 21, 2018
- Website type: News
- Available in: English
- Founded: December 2011; 14 years ago
- Dissolved: May 5, 2023; 3 years ago
- Headquarters: New York City, U.S.
- Owner: BuzzFeed
- Key people: Mark Schoofs (editor-in-chief); Ben Smith (former editor-in-chief)
- Website: buzzfeednews.com
- Advertising: Native
- Current status: Discontinued

BuzzFeed News was an American news website published by BuzzFeed beginning in 2011. It ceased posting new hard news content in May 2023. It published a number of high-profile scoops, including the Steele dossier, for which it was strongly criticized, and the FinCEN Files. It won the George Polk Award, The Sidney Award, the National Magazine Award, the National Press Foundation award, and the Pulitzer Prize for International Reporting.

On April 20, 2023, BuzzFeed CEO Jonah Peretti announced that BuzzFeed News would be gradually shut down as part of company-wide layoffs. BuzzFeed, Inc. refocused its news efforts on HuffPost, which the company had acquired in 2020. BuzzFeed News discontinued adding new content on May 5, 2023.

== History ==
BuzzFeed News began as a division of BuzzFeed in December 2011 with the appointment of Ben Smith from Politico as editor-in-chief. In 2013, Pulitzer Prize winner Mark Schoofs of ProPublica was hired as head of investigative reporting. By 2016, BuzzFeed News had 20 investigative journalists. The British division of BuzzFeed News was headed by Janine Gibson, formerly of The Guardian. Notable coverage included a 2012 partnership with the BBC on match-fixing in professional tennis, and inequities in the U.S. H-2 guest worker program, reporting of which won a National Magazine Award.

A 2017 study in the journal Journalism, which compared news articles by BuzzFeed and The New York Times, found that BuzzFeed News largely followed established rules of journalism. Both publications predominantly used inverted pyramid news format, and journalists' opinions were absent from the majority of articles of both. Both BuzzFeed News and the Times predominantly covered government and politics, and predominantly used politicians, government, and law enforcement as sources. In contrast, BuzzFeed News devoted more articles to social issues such as protests and LGBT issues, more frequently quoted ordinary people, less frequently covered crime and terrorism, and had fewer articles focusing on negative aspects of an issue.

On July 18, 2018, BuzzFeed News moved from a section of the BuzzFeed site to its own domain, BuzzFeedNews.com, with a Trending News Bar and programmatic advertisements.

In January 2019, it laid off 15% of its staff, putting an end to its national news desk.

In May 2020, Smith left BuzzFeed News to become a media columnist for The New York Times. Schoofs succeeded him as editor-in-chief. BuzzFeed announced that it would be closing its Australia and United Kingdom news operations.

In March 2022, the company announced that it was in the process of cutting staff positions in an attempt to position itself for profitability. Editor-in-chief Mark Schoofs, deputy editor-in-chief Tom Namako, and executive editor of investigations Ariel Kaminer announced their departures. Staff buyout offers were made to reporters on the investigations, science, politics and inequality desks. Approximately half of the company's 100 reporters were offered buyout deals.

On April 20, 2023, BuzzFeed announced it would shut down BuzzFeed News as part of a 15% workforce cut. Approximately 180 jobs were at that time reported to have been expected to be cut, and the shutdown was at that time reported to be expected to be gradual. According to Digiday, changes to news-related policies of social media platforms such as Facebook were indicated as a factor in the decision. BuzzFeed, Inc. refocused news efforts into HuffPost, also indicating that some employees previously hired at BuzzFeed News may be rehired either there or at BuzzFeed.com.

== Editorial stance, coverage, and criticism ==
BuzzFeed News stated in its editorial guide that "we firmly believe that for a number of issues, including civil rights, women's rights, anti-racism, and LGBT equality, there are not two sides" but also said that "when it comes to activism, BuzzFeed editorial must follow the lead of our editors and reporters who come out of a tradition of rigorous, neutral journalism that puts facts and news first." Some commentators have criticized BuzzFeed's editorial guide as internally inconsistent, arguing that BuzzFeed News cannot claims to be neutral while also endorsing positions on controversial political issues.

The media watchdog Fairness and Accuracy in Reporting found that in 100 BuzzFeed stories about Barack Obama in 2016 (most from BuzzFeed News, but also from the general BuzzFeed site), 65 were positive, 34 were neutral, and one was critical. The report described BuzzFeed's coverage of Obama "creepy" and "almost uniformly uncritical and often sycophantic".

In June 2020, BuzzFeed News senior reporter Ryan Broderick was fired after it was revealed he had "plagiarized or misattributed information in at least 11 of his articles."

== Notable stories ==
=== ISDS exposé ===
On August 28, 2016, Chris Hamby published a series of articles detailing how international investors were using the investor–state dispute settlement (ISDS) to "undermine domestic regulations and gut environmental laws at the expense of poorer nations". Beginning with his article "The Court That Rules the World" and continuing for an eight-article series, Hamby detailed alleged abuses of power of the court. The Pulitzer Prize nomination cited this as bringing attention to the court, and the articles were cited in a question to the European Parliament. In the articles, Hamby dives into cases such as Sajwani v. Egypt allowed investors who made deals with corrupt regimes to keep those deals after the fall of the regime. He also exposed how the threat of the court is used to prevent fines and expensive environmental cleanups, such as the leak of lead into the groundwater in Sitio del Niño, El Salvador.

The ISDS provisions were controversially included in NAFTA and the TPP. The former was stripped of its ISDS provisions and the latter was rejected by the United States.

=== Steele dossier ===
On January 10, 2017, CNN reported on the existence of classified documents that claimed Russia had compromising personal and financial information about President-elect Donald Trump. Trump and President Barack Obama had both been briefed on the content of the dossier the previous week. CNN did not publish the dossier, or any specific details of the dossier, as they could not be verified. Later the same day, BuzzFeed News published a 35-page dossier nearly in-full. BuzzFeed News said that the dossier was unverified and "includes some clear errors". The dossier had been read widely by political and media figures in Washington. It previously had been sent to multiple journalists who had declined to publish it as unsubstantiated.

The next day, Trump responded, calling the website a "failing pile of garbage" during a news conference. The publication of the dossier was also met with criticism from, among others, CNN reporter Jake Tapper, who called it irresponsible. BuzzFeed News editor-in-chief Ben Smith defended the site's decision to publish the dossier.

BuzzFeed News faced at least two lawsuits as a result of publishing the dossier. In February 2017, Aleksej Gubarev, the Russian chief of the technology company XBT, and a figure named in the dossier, sued BuzzFeed News for defamation. The suit centered on the allegations from the dossier that XBT had been "using botnets and porn traffic to transmit viruses, plant bugs, steal data and conduct 'altering operations' against the Democratic Party leadership". In response, BuzzFeed redacted the name of the company and official in its published dossier. In May 2017, Mikhail Fridman, Petr Aven, and German Khan – the owners of Alfa Bank – filed a defamation lawsuit against BuzzFeed News for publishing the unverified dossier. It alleged financial ties and collusion between Putin, Trump, and the three bank owners. In January 2018, one year after the dossier became public, Trump's lawyer Michael D. Cohen, who was also named in the dossier, filed a defamation lawsuit against BuzzFeed News. The same day, Ben Smith again defended the publication in a New York Times op-ed, calling it "undoubtedly real news". In February 2018, BuzzFeed News sued the Democratic National Committee to obtain their internal investigation documents regarding the hack of their server during the presidential campaign in order for the journal to better defend itself against Gubarev's lawsuit. In April 2018, Cohen dropped his defamation suit.

=== Leaked Milo Yiannopoulos emails ===
An exposé by BuzzFeed News, published on October 5, 2017, documented how Breitbart News solicited story ideas and copy edits from white supremacists and neo-Nazis, with Milo Yiannopoulos acting as an intermediary. Yiannopoulos and other Breitbart employees developed and marketed the values and tactics of these groups, attempting to make them palatable to a broader audience. In the article, BuzzFeed News senior technology reporter Joseph Bernstein wrote that Breitbart actively fed from the "most hate-filled, racist voices of the alt-right," and helped normalize the American far right.

MSNBC's Chris Hayes ranked the article as "one of the best reported pieces of the year". The Columbia Journalism Review described the story as a scrupulous, months-long project and "the culmination of years of reporting and source-building on a beat that few thought much about until Donald Trump won the presidential election."

=== Kevin Spacey sexual misconduct accusation ===
On October 29, 2017, BuzzFeed News published the original story in which actor Anthony Rapp accused actor Kevin Spacey of making sexual advances toward him at a party in 1986, when Rapp was 14 and Spacey was 26. Subsequently, numerous other men alleged that Spacey had sexually harassed or assaulted them. As a result, Netflix indefinitely suspended production of Spacey's TV series House of Cards, and opted to not release his film Gore on their service, although it was already in post-production at the time.

Spacey was replaced with Christopher Plummer in Ridley Scott's film All the Money in the World, which was six weeks from release.

=== Michael Cohen story ===
On January 17, 2019, BuzzFeed News published an article in which the authors accused Trump of ordering his personal attorney, Michael Cohen, to lie to Congress about the timing of a deal to build a Trump Tower in Moscow. The article states that Trump was given updates by Cohen at least ten times and cites texts, messages, and emails as sources. In the day following the release of the report, many prominent Democrats called for impeachment if the accusations were true, including former attorney general Eric Holder.

The office of Robert Mueller disputed the report on January 19, calling it "not accurate". With the release of the Mueller report in April 2019, the report found that while there was evidence that Trump was aware that Cohen had provided false testimony to Congress, "the evidence available to us does not establish that the President directed or aided Cohen's false testimony." BuzzFeed News issued an update to their original story stating, "The Mueller Report found that Trump did not direct Michael Cohen to lie." Ben Smith, then-editor-in-chief of BuzzFeed News, responded by releasing notes from the FBI interview with Cohen, which said "Cohen told OSC (Mueller's office) he was asked to lie by DJT/DJT Jr., lawyers." Smith said, "Our sources – federal law enforcement officials – interpreted the evidence Cohen presented as meaning that the president 'directed' Cohen to lie. We now know that Mueller did not."

=== FinCEN Files ===
In September 2020, BuzzFeed News, alongside the International Consortium of Investigative Journalists, released the FinCEN files, a collection of 2,657 documents leaked from the Financial Crimes Enforcement Network (FinCEN).

== Awards and recognition ==
BuzzFeed News received a 2016 National Magazine Award in the category of Public Interest. Other awards won by BuzzFeed News journalists include 2014 and 2016 National Press Foundation awards, 2015 Sidney Award, 2017 British Journalism Award, and 2018 George Polk Award. BuzzFeed News staff won the 2021 award for the Pulitzer Prizes in International Reporting; in addition, BuzzFeed News staff were finalists for this award in 2017, 2018, and 2021. BuzzFeed News also won the 2016 and 2018 Online Journalism Awards. BuzzFeed News was a finalist for the 2018 Goldsmith Prize for Investigative Reporting. In 2021, BuzzFeed News won the Pulitzer Prize for International Reporting for its coverage of the Xinjiang re-education camps as a part of China's campaign against the Muslim Uyghurs.

BuzzFeed News was a member of the White House press corps. BuzzFeed News is considered by Wikipedia editors to be a reliable source. Editors have distinguished BuzzFeed News from BuzzFeed, which they note has inconsistent editorial quality.
