= David Kirby (journalist) =

American journalist

- Born: May 18, 1960
- Died: April 16, 2023 (aged 62)
- Occupation: Journalist

David Kirby was an American journalist based in Brooklyn, New York, who was a regular contributor to The New York Times amongst other publications. He was the author of Evidence of Harm (2005), Animal Factory (2010), Death at Sea World (2012), and When They Come for You (2019). Kirby promoted the false claim that the vaccine preservative thiomersal caused autism, as well as various conspiracy theories related to that claim. He was also a critic of factory farming.

== Biography ==
Kirby wrote for many national magazines, including Glamour, Redbook, Self, and Mademoiselle. From 1986 to 1990, Kirby was a foreign correspondent for UPI, and Newsday (among others) in Latin America, covering wars in El Salvador and Nicaragua, and he covered politics, corruption, and natural disasters in Mexico. It was during this time that he was also a reporter for OutWeek.

From 1990 to 1993, Kirby was director of public information at the American Foundation for AIDS Research (AmFAR), worked for New York City Council President Carol Bellamy, and was a senior staff adviser to David Dinkins' successful 1989 run for mayor of New York City.

In 1998, Kirby wrote a cover story for The Advocate, "Does coming out matter?". From 1998 to 2001, he wrote many articles for The Advocate, including one on the courage of young gay and lesbian scouts and service members.

From 2000 to 2004, Kirby contributed several articles on travel to The New York Times, including "Rainbow Beach Towels on Mexican Sand", an article on the gay tourism industry in Puerto Vallarta. He has also written on topics other than travel and leisure, including on a new phenomenon, known as "dirty driving", the playing pornography on DVD screens inside vehicles while they drive through traffic. The article expressed concern for what children have been exposed to by these "dirty drivers".

In 2005, Kirby's book Evidence of Harm - Mercury in Vaccines and the Autism Epidemic: A Medical Controversy was published.

Kirby was a contributing blogger at The Huffington Post.

According to an article in Gay City News, David Kirby died on April 16, 2023 in Puebla, Mexico, after a fall leading to an illness. He was 62 years old.

== Research ==
=== Evidence of Harm ===
Evidence of Harm (2005) explores the controversies surrounding thimerosal-containing vaccines (TCVs), and whether TCVs have contributed to the apparent increase of autism, ADHD, speech delays, and other developmental disorders in the United States. In the book, Kirby profiled the parents of autistic children, including the founders of anti-vaccination group SafeMinds. Among those profiled were Sallie Bernard, Lyn Redwood, Mark Blaxill, Albert Enayati, Heidi Roger, and Liz Birt.

The autism-vaccine link has been firmly discredited. Vast population studies have shown there to be no link between vaccines (including those containing thiomersal) and autism. The original paper by Andrew Wakefield that started a media firestorm and led to fears of vaccination amongst parents has been discredited and research by journalist Brian Deer showed the data used in the paper to be fraudulent.

==== British Medical Journal review ====
In May 2005, Evidence of Harm was reviewed negatively in the British Medical Journal, receiving one out of four stars. Reviewer Michael Fitzpatrick made the following statements:

- [Kirby] seems to take at face value every claim made by campaigning parents in the United States who believe that vaccines containing the mercury based preservative thiomersal caused their children to become autistic.
- Kirby echoes the conviction of parents who believe that vaccines are to blame for an "epidemic of autism." He endorses their dismissal of the consensus among autism specialists that the most likely explanation for the increasing number of cases is the greater recognition of the condition among parents and professionals and the expansion of diagnostic categories.
- Kirby also endorses campaigners' assertions that the symptoms of mercury toxicity are similar to those of autism. But the clinical features of these conditions are quite distinct.
- In his determination to provide an account that is sympathetic to the parents Kirby enters into the grip of the same delusion and ends up in the same angry and paranoid universe into which campaigners have descended, alleging phone taps and other forms of surveillance as they struggle against sinister conspiracies between health authorities and drug companies.
- The only value of this woefully one sided account of the mercury and autism controversy is the insight it offers into the way that credulous journalists have contributed to the public nuisance and private distress caused by antivaccine campaigns.

=== Animal Factory ===
In 2010, Kirby authored Animal Factory: The Looming Threat of Industrial Pig, Dairy, and Poultry Farms to Humans and the Environment. The book exposes the business interests, environmental effects, and terrible conditions of factory farms.

It was positively reviewed by National Public Radio which concluded that "the growth of factory farming in America obviously brings up issues of animal welfare, labor and nutrition, but Kirby's focus in Animal Factory is purely how the farms are changing, perhaps irrevocably, the environments and the long-term health of the people who live near them. There's no political pleading or ideological agitprop in this book; it's remarkably fair-minded, both sober and sobering."

== Selected publications ==
- Evidence of Harm: Mercury in Vaccines and the Autism Epidemic: A Medical Controversy (2005)
- Animal Factory: The Looming Threat of Industrial Pig, Dairy, and Poultry Farms to Humans and the Environment (2010)
- Death at SeaWorld: Shamu and the Dark Side of Killer Whales in Captivity (2012)
- When They Come for You: How Police and Government Are Trampling Our Liberties - And How to Take Them Back (2019)
