= Michelangelo Signorile =

American journalist, author, and talk radio host

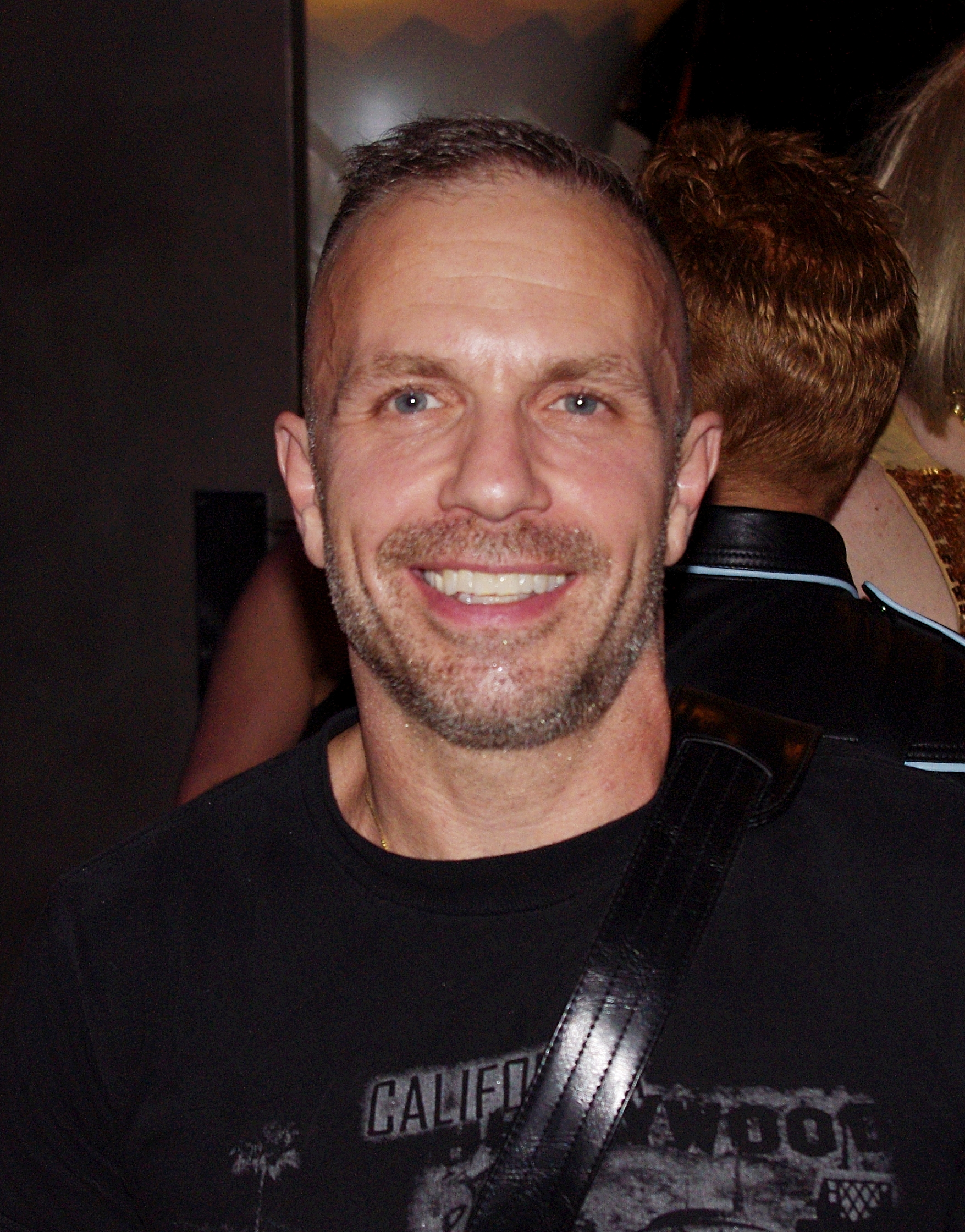
- Signorile in 2011 at the book launch party for Michael Musto's Fork on the Left, Knife in the Back
- Born: December 19, 1960 (age 65); Brooklyn, New York, U.S.
- Occupations: Journalist, Radio host, political commentator, columnist
- Spouse: David Gerstner (m. 2013)
- Writing career
- Genre: LGBT literature
- Notable work: Queer in America

Michelangelo Signorile (/ˌsiːnjəˈrɪlə/; born December 19, 1960) is an American journalist, author and talk radio host. His radio program is aired each weekday across the United States and Canada on Sirius XM Radio and globally online. Signorile was editor-at-large for HuffPost from 2011 until 2019. Signorile is a political liberal, and covers a wide variety of political and cultural issues.

Signorile is noted for his various books and articles on gay and lesbian politics, and is an outspoken supporter of gay rights. Signorile's seminal 1993 book Queer in America: Sex, The Media, and the Closets of Power explored the negative effects of the LGBT closet, and provided one of the first intellectual justifications for the practice of outing public officials, influencing the debate and treatment of the issue among journalists from that point on. In 1992 Newsweek listed him as one of America's "100 Cultural Elite," and he is included as #100 in the 2002 book, The Gay 100: A Ranking of the Most Influential Gay Men and Lesbians, Past and Present.

In August 2011, Signorile was inducted into the National Lesbian and Gay Journalists Association LGBT Journalist Hall of Fame. In November 2012, Signorile was included in the Out magazine annual Out 100. In April 2015, Signorile's fifth book, It's Not Over: Getting Beyond Tolerance, Defeating Homophobia and Winning True Equality, was published.

== Early years ==
Signorile was born in Brooklyn, New York, and spent his early childhood in the 1960s and 1970s in Brooklyn and Staten Island. He attended the S. I. Newhouse School of Public Communications at Syracuse University, where he majored in journalism. It was in those years that he came to realize his own homosexuality, but remained closeted to many friends and to family.

In the mid-1980s, shortly after graduating from college, Signorile moved to Manhattan. Among his first jobs, he worked for an entertainment public relations firm that specialized in "column-planting", a term for getting clients into New York City's gossip columns, such as Page Six in the New York Post and Liz Smith, then at the New York Daily News. This required collecting and trading in gossip, often about celebrities' private lives. Later, he became a gossip columnist himself. It was in that world, as Signorile describes in his book Queer in America, where he saw a double standard regarding how the media glamorized heterosexuality among celebrities while covering up homosexuality. But Signorile was not political at the time. He was somewhat open about his own homosexuality by that time, but he had not looked at it in the broader context of politics and culture in America. His political awakening came as the AIDS epidemic expanded in the late 1980s and more friends were getting sick and dying.

== Activism ==
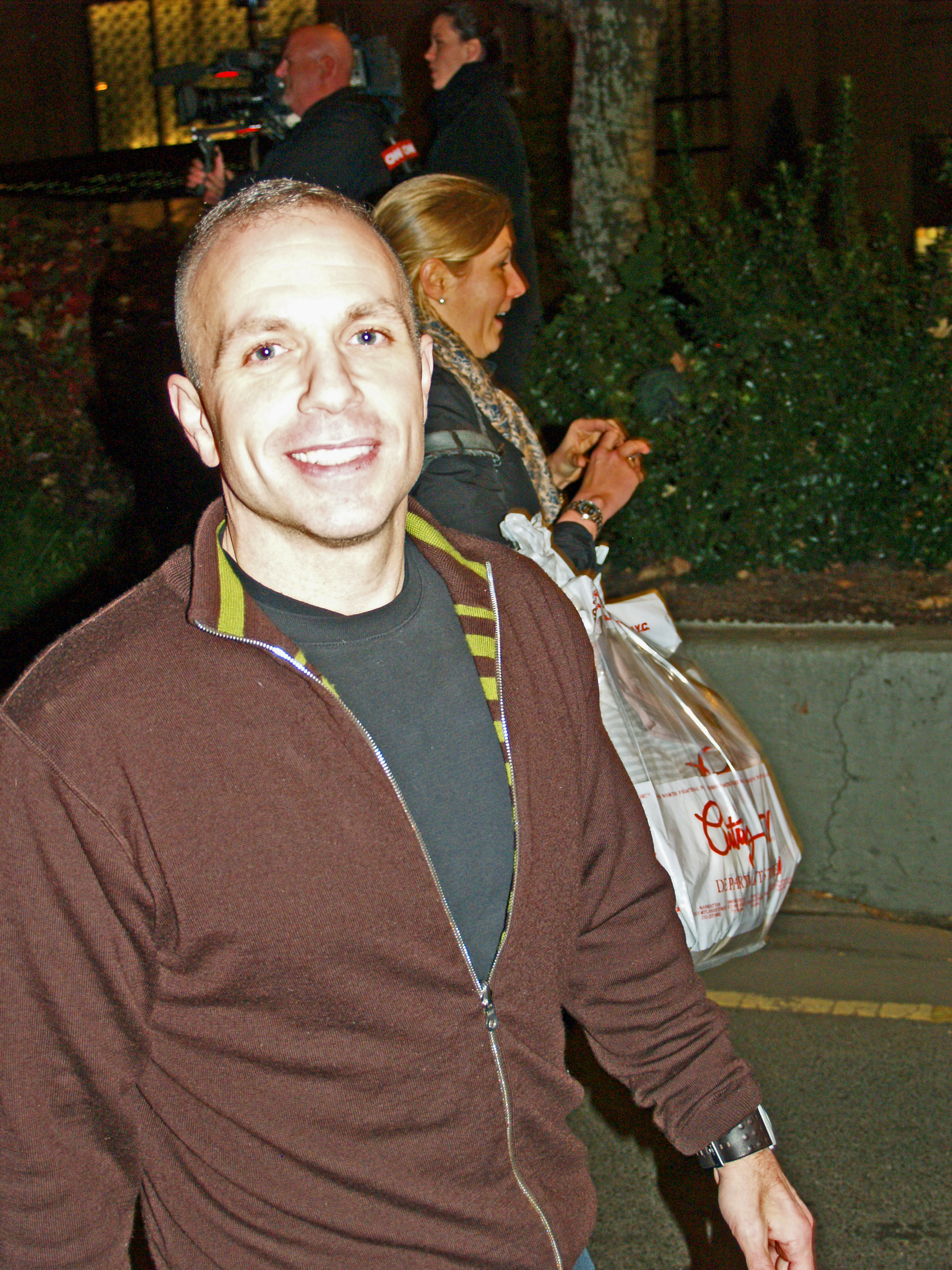
Signorile at a large anti-Proposition 8 protest he co-organized in New York City in November 2008.

In his book Queer in America and in numerous articles and interviews, Signorile has discussed how he began to see that many in the media, among his circles as well, were either sensationalizing AIDS in the 1980s or running away from it. He also began to believe the government was negligent in the face of the epidemic.

Signorile became a gay activist in 1988, after attending a meeting of the controversial grass roots protest group, ACT UP, in New York. Within days of the meeting he was arrested at a protest at St. Peter's Evangelical Lutheran Church at the Citigroup Center, where the Vatican's envoy and the author of much of the Vatican's recent positions against homosexuality, gay rights and the use of condoms to prevent the spread of HIV, Cardinal Joseph Ratzinger, was to give a major speech. (Ratzinger would go on to become Pope Benedict XVI, succeeding Pope John Paul II upon his death in April 2005.) Signorile has explained that he went to the event solely to watch the protesters who were planning on standing up among the attendees and letting their voices be heard. But he became filled with rage while hearing Ratzinger speak, thinking about the homophobia he'd experienced as a child and the Catholic Church's decrees. (He was raised as a Roman Catholic.) "Suddenly," Signorile wrote in Queer in America about the protest, "I jumped up on one of the marble platforms, and looking down, I addressed the entire congregation in the loudest voice I could. My voice rang out as if it were amplified. I pointed at Ratzinger and shouted, 'He is no man of God!' The shocked faces of the assembled Catholics turned to the back of the room to look at me as I continued: 'He is no man of God. He is the devil!'" Signorile was pulled down, handcuffed, and carted off by the police.

Signorile soon became the chair of the media committee of ACT UP, organizing publicity for major, theatrical AIDS activist protests of the time, and taking on the Food and Drug Administration, the National Institutes of Health, New York's City Hall and other government agencies in the media, criticizing them for what AIDS activists saw as their foot-dragging while people were dying. Though controversial, ACT UP and its tactics have been credited with bringing more attention to AIDS among politicians and the media, and speeding the development and approval of HIV drugs in the 1990s. Signorile also was a co-founding member, along with three other ACT UP members, of the in-your-face activist group Queer Nation.

In May 2017, Signorile was criticized for an article that appeared on the Huffington Post. In the piece, he attacked Donald Trump and the Republican legislators supporting his agenda, stating that no Republican congressman "should be able to sit down for a nice, quiet lunch or dinner in a Washington, DC, eatery or even in their own homes", and "should be hounded by protestors everywhere, especially in public ― in restaurants, in shopping centers, in their districts, and yes, on the public property outside their homes and apartments".

== The outing controversy ==
Signorile has been considered a pioneer of outing (though he believes the discussion has often been distorted by the media, and he opposes using a violent, active verb to define the phenomenon). Signorile has argued in favor of outing from a journalistic perspective, calling for the "equalization" of reporting on gay and straight public figures. He has argued that the homosexuality of public figures—and only public figures—should be reported on when relevant. Signorile was a co-founding editor of the gay magazine OutWeek, which launched in June 1989, and which was quickly at the center of heated debates inside and outside the gay community, including controversies over outing. Signorile became the features editor at OutWeek, and eventually stopped working within ACT UP and Queer Nation, though, like most of the staff of OutWeek, he maintained deep ties to both groups.

Signorile saw his role at OutWeek as one of taking on the media and the entertainment industry. From the start of the magazine he wrote a weekly column called "Gossip Watch," which was just that—a watch of the gossip columns. He began writing about the media's double standard in reporting on gay and straight public figures, and how he believed it made gays invisible in the midst of the health crisis. Among those whom Signorile outed at that time included Hollywood producer David Geffen (who has long since acknowledged that he is gay). Geffen, as a record producer, was promoting Guns N' Roses, a rock group which had been attacked for antigay lyrics ("...faggots...spread some fuckin' disease") and other performers, such as comedian Andrew Dice Clay, whose comedy routines in the late 1980s were seen by many as homophobic and misogynistic. Clay had said in a 1984 stand-up act that in Hollywood they have "herpes, AIDS and fag-itis." Clay has also mocked pleas for AIDS funding ("get a job, buttfucka"), and used antigay slurs; "they don't know if they want to be called gays, homosexuals, fairies," he has said. "I call them cocksuckers." Signorile saw it as relevant to discuss Geffen's closeted homosexuality in that context. Signorile also outed the gossip columnist Liz Smith (who also eventually acknowledged her bisexuality), who he maintained helped celebrities and others to present themselves as heterosexual when they were in fact gay.

The media and celebrity culture that Signorile vilified took notice of his work. The chic fashion industry bible, W magazine, put OutWeek on the "In" list, calling it a "must-read" because of its mix of "culture, politics and vicious gossip" (Queer in America, p. 73), and Signorile would eventually be profiled in New York Magazine and in The New York Times. Signorile was both praised and attacked for his column. He was called "one of the greater contemporary gay heroes," while his work was also called "revolting, infantile, cheap name-calling" (Johansson & Percy, p. 183). New York Post columnist Amy Pagnozzi compared him to the right-wing, anti-communist 1950s senator, Joseph McCarthy, in a column headlined "Magazine Drags Gays Out of the Closet" (Queer in America, p. 73). It was Time that coined the term "outing" at that time, something Signorile has always contended was a biased term. He saw what he was doing as simply "reporting."

The outing controversy became much larger in March 1990, when Signorile wrote a cover story for OutWeek revealing the homosexuality of the publishing tycoon Malcolm Forbes within weeks of his death, headlined "The Other Side of Malcolm Forbes." In a subsequent article in The Village Voice, Signorile charged a media cover-up of his Forbes story, claiming that various news outlets were going to report on it, but later decided against it. Eventually, over a period of months, the story was reported in several news outlets, including the Los Angeles Times, but The New York Times still refused to name Forbes, only referring to him as "a recently deceased businessman" who was outed. (It wasn't until five years later, during coverage of Forbes' son Steve's run for the Republican nomination for president in 1996, that the Times reported on Malcolm Forbes' gay life.)

OutWeek folded in June 1991. Signorile joined The Advocate with a cover story several months later that put him at the center of a firestorm over gays in the military as well as outing: he outed Assistant Secretary of Defense for Public Affairs Pete Williams (Williams has since gone on to become a television journalist for NBC News). The outing caused Secretary of Defense Dick Cheney to call the gay ban "an old chestnut" during an interview with Sam Donaldson on ABC, while then presidential candidate Bill Clinton, citing the outing, promised at a gay fundraiser to overturn the ban if he were elected president.

== Gay culture debates ==
Signorile wrote columns and feature stories for The Advocate for several years, including the groundbreaking two-part cover story "Out at The New York Times"—in which the paper's gay and lesbian staffers, its top editors and its then-new publisher, Arthur Ochs Sulzberger, Jr., spoke for the first time, to Signorile, about years of homophobia at the paper of record and how they were charting a new course. In 1994, Signorile left the Advocate for the then new glossy, Out magazine, which was founded by his friend and OutWeek colleague Michael Goff and former OutWeek editor Sarah Pettit. In 1995 Signorile published his second book, Outing Yourself, a 14-step program for coming out as gay or lesbian.

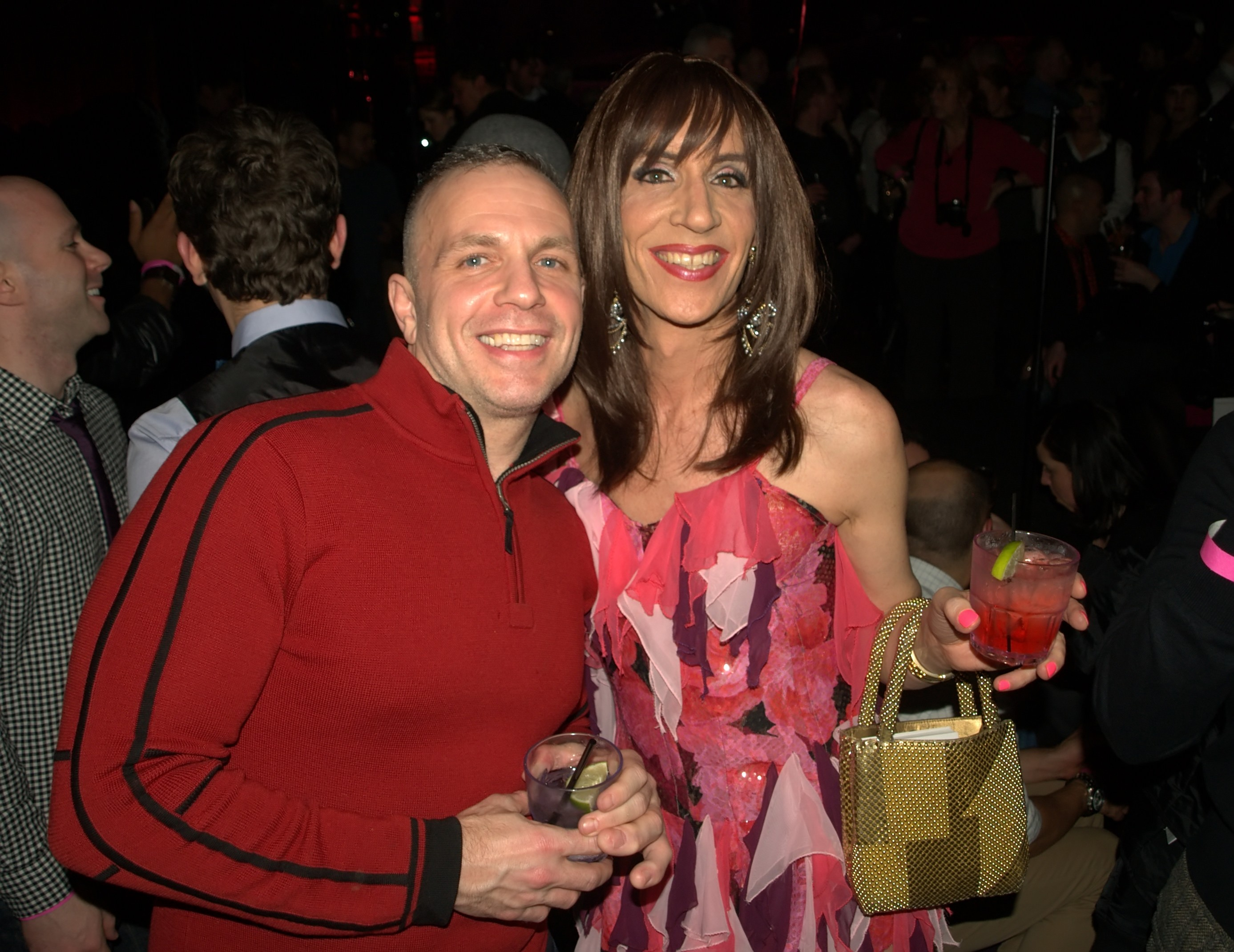
Signorile and Linda Simpson at Michael Musto's Village Voice 25th-anniversary party.

At that time, as an Out magazine columnist and editor-at-large, Signorile soon was at the center of often-heated debates among gay activists, sexual liberationists and HIV prevention experts about gay male sexual culture and the prevalence of unsafe sex and HIV transmission. Signorile wrote a column for Out that sparked much discussion, titled "Unsafe Like Me," in which he addressed the issue by admitting to have slipped up himself, having had an incident of unprotected sex, and discussed what may have led someone like him—a prominent AIDS activist, immersed in the issues of prevention—to have such a lapse. The column was adapted to the op-ed page of The New York Times and inspired a CBS "60 Minutes" treatment of the issue in which Signorile was profiled. Signorile followed up that column with several others that focused on what he saw as some unhealthy aspects of gay culture that contributed to low self-esteem and risk-taking. This eventually grew into his 1997 bestseller Life Outside: The Signorile Report on Gay Men: Sex, Drugs, Muscles and the Passages of Life, which was a finalist for the New York Public Library Book Award for Excellence in Journalism. The columns and the book created controversy among some activists; Signorile was criticized by the group Sex Panic! which believed that he and other writers had inspired government crack-downs on gay sex through their writings. Many other commentators and activists disagreed with Signorile's critics, and fierce debates broke out in both gay and mainstream media. Signorile also inspired much discussion and debate with pieces in Out on anti-abortion gays, animals rights vs. medical research, gay marriage and high-profile antigay hate crimes.

In August 1998, Signorile left Out magazine abruptly in a disagreement with the new editor James Collard. Former Out editor and co-founder, the late Sarah Pettit, a long-time colleague of Signorile's who was also an editor at OutWeek, had been ousted from Out that year in a shake up (Michael Goff had been pushed out earlier) in which she had charged sex discrimination. The new editor, from the UK, had been a promoter of the "post-gay" sensibility, which seemed to eschew activism. According to Signorile, speaking to gay journalist Rex Wockner, Collard wanted him to tone down his writing. "We had a heated discussion and he insulted my sensibilities and it made me so angry I threw water in his face," Signorile told Wockner. "They did not want me to write biting commentary and opinion. They wanted me to do more feature-driven work and I refused to do that because my column in Out has always been a space where I could do commentary, political analysis, features, whatever I wanted. I think it's important to have commentary and solidly researched journalism in the same forum."

== The radio years ==
Several months after leaving Out, Signorile joined The Advocate once again, in December 1998, as a columnist and editor-at-large; his first article was a cover piece taking on the notion of a "post-gay' society as espoused by Out editor Collard. (Within a year after Collard took the post and six months after Signorile left Out, Collard left Out amid reports of a drop in circulation and negative response of a focus group to the magazine.) In 2000, Signorile left The Advocate again, and became a columnist for global Internet site Gay.com, which had just merged with the pioneering LGBT site PlanetOut.com. Signorile traveled around the U.S. and around the world, writing online columns. He covered the controversy surrounding the Millennium March on Washington for LGBT Rights, which divided many in the community regarding its time and purpose and at which a theft occurred at the festival. Signorile reported from Australia and New Zealand, where his partner had taken a position as a professor, and reported on World Pride in Rome in 2000, where activists butted heads with the Vatican, which tried to get the event canceled. During that time Signorile also pioneered Internet radio, webcasting a weekly show on GAYBC.com beginning in 2000, covering the global LGBT community. In an interview, he has described a machine called a "vector" that he would plug into a phone outlet and which allowed him to webcast live via Gaybc's studios in Seattle.(Media Bistro Q & A with Signorile 2002)

In April 2003, Signorile began hosting a radio program, The Michelangelo Signorile Show, on Sirius XM Radio's OutQ each weekday 2 to 6 p.m. Eastern Time. OutQ, as the only 24/7 LGBT radio channel, broke new ground and Signorile's interviews and monologues often made news. After a little over 10 years, on July 23, 2013, he moved to the newly launched SiriusXM Progress (channel 127) from 3 to 6 p.m. Eastern Time. The show airs on satellite radio across North America and is streamed worldwide on the Internet and to the Android, BlackBerry, and iOS (iPad, iPhone, iPod Touch) handheld devices to over 25 million Sirius XM subscribers. Signorile interviews politicians, activists, journalists, authors and other public figures, analyzes news and cultural events, and takes calls from listeners from coast-to-coast. Signorile's show is one of the highest rated programs on the Sirius XM network with an average daily listenership of more than 8.5 million households. Often, Signorile brings on those who are on America's right-wing or are opponents of gay rights, with whom he engages in energetic debates. He is also editor-at-large for The Huffington Post Queer Voices where he blogs opinion pieces and interviews public figures.

Signorile has been an editor-at-large and columnist for The Advocate, and an editor-at-large and a columnist for Out magazine. He has written for many newspapers and magazines, including The New York Times, USA Today, and Los Angeles Times, and has appeared on many American television news programs, including Larry King Live, Today and Good Morning America. His magazine articles, newspaper columns and website, which "offers his always-intriguing take on the state of gay rights and other political and cultural topics", champion the cause of gay rights. In particular, Signorile has advocated that gay Americans come out, and has talked about the deleterious effects of the closet both on the closeted individual and on society as a whole. Signorile has been a long-time champion of the right to same-sex marriage. Signorile and much of his work over the years were featured prominently in the film Outrage, directed by acclaimed documentary filmmaker Kirby Dick and which focused on closeted antigay politicians, making a case for why media should report on their sexual orientation.

== Books ==
- Queer In America (ISBN 0-299-19374-8) 1993.
- Outing Yourself (ISBN 0-684-82617-8) 1995.
- Life Outside (ISBN 0-06-092904-9) 1997. (Nominated Lambda Literary Award, Gay Men's Studies)
- Hitting Hard (ISBN 0-7867-1619-3) 2005.
- It's Not Over (ISBN 0-544-381-009) 2015. (Finalists for the Publishing Triangle's Randy Shilts Award for Gay Nonfiction)
