= Queer as Folk =

Queer as Folk may refer to:

- Queer as Folk (British TV series), 1999–2000
- Queer as Folk (2000 TV series), a 2000–2005 American and Canadian version of the British series
  - Queer as Folk soundtracks, soundtrack albums from the North American series
- Queer as Folk (2022 TV series), a 2022 American update of the two earlier series
- Queer as Folk, a 2018 album by Grace Petrie
