= QW (magazine) =

Defunct LGBTQ magazine published in New York City

Queer World (QW) magazine was a gay and lesbian weekly news magazine published in New York City from 1991 to 1992. During its 18-month existence, QW covered gay and lesbian news, politics, the arts, and AIDS.

== Founding ==
After Outweek's closure in 1991, former advertising executives Colleen Mangan and Troy Masters launched the magazine in October 1991 with the name New York Queer (NYQ), but in early 1992 it changed its name to QW. Mangan and Masters were the publishers and owners of the magazine. QW was the sole publication of Chafin Communications Inc and was financed by its president and chief executive, William F. Chafin.It printed lifestyle content, general feature stories about fashion, celebrities, travel, and current events on high-grade glossy paper.

== Closing ==
In the early 1990s, a number of new gay national magazines, including Out, Genre, and 10 Percent, appeared, all competing among themselves for national advertising dollars; most had short lives.

QW published for 18 months until closing in November 1992 due to the death of its principle funder, Bill Chafin, who died of AIDS in October of that year. Masters said Chafin had invested nearly USD 1 million in the magazine before his death. The No. 55 issue, released on November 29 of that year was the last issue published.

== Impact ==
Despite its brief existence, QW helped bring gay and AIDS issues into the mainstream.

In 1994, Maer Roshan, the former editor-in-chief of QW, proposed a magazine for gay readers to Time Inc. Ventures. The proposed magazine would aim to encompass the spectrum of gay political opinion.

Masters would go on to be a trailblazer in LGBTQ journalism with a career spanning over 40 years, working at LGNY, later founding Gay City News and the Los Angeles Blade.
