= The Trouble with Normal (book) =

1999 book by Michael Warner

- Author: Michael Warner
- Language: English
- Subject: Same-sex marriage
- Publisher: The Free Press
- Publication date: 1999
- Publication place: United States
- Media type: Print (hardcover and paperback)
- ISBN: 978-0-684-86529-4

The Trouble with Normal: Sex, Politics, and the Ethics of Queer Life is a book by Michael Warner, in which the author discusses the role of same-sex marriage as a goal for gay rights activists. First published in 1999 by The Free Press, an imprint of Simon & Schuster, it was re-published in 2000 in paperback by Harvard University Press. Warner argues that the right to marry is an inadequate and ultimately undesirable goal for gay rights activism. As well as addressing marriage, he considers other areas in which public discourse stigmatizes certain sexual behaviors, including through sensationalist coverage of sex scandals, public zoning initiatives that marginalize the sex industry, and the attempted use of shame to manage sexually transmitted disease. The book has been described as a classic of the debates on normalcy as a goal for the gay rights movement, and as an important contribution to queer theory.

== Overview ==
The Trouble with Normal argues that same-sex marriage should not be the sole goal for gay rights activism; that gay activists should work toward equal benefits for domestic partners and unconventional families. When national LGBT activists insist on the overriding importance of marriage, the book argues, it stigmatizes queer people who choose other types of relationships, while ignoring a broad range of legal benefits that could help the entire community, not just legally married couples. Criticizing those who present gay marriage and the repeal of the Don't Ask, Don't Tell policy as the sole remaining aims of the (American) gay rights movement, Warner contends that the institutional sanctioning of certain types of relationship always comes at the expense of others, which are constituted by contrast as abnormal, inferior, and shameful. He argues that any queer rights movement would do better to abandon the pursuit of normality in favour of campaigning for the recognition of broader varieties of sexual expression as dignified. He discusses the part played by the idea of normality in the uneven distribution of sexual shame that inhibits lives, and the negative consequences — including greater risk of violence and disease — that result.

== Synopsis ==
Chapter One criticizes the idea that there is some morally compelling aspect to "normality", arguing that the normal range is simply a statistical category to which there is no ethical obligation to correspond: "If normal just means within a common statistical range, there is no reason to be normal or not". Warner uses the example of former US president Bill Clinton's impeachment after a sexual scandal to argue that public and political discourse uses shame disingenuously, to portray certain kinds of sexual behaviour as intolerable, when private morality generally recognises the compatibility of sex with dignity.

The second chapter argues that as well as being a limited goal, less urgent than the elimination of violence and discrimination against queer people, same-sex marriage actively causes negative consequences both for queer and straight people, because in validating a single, prescribed type of relationship it devalues and makes more difficult other kinds of interpersonal relationship. Warner argues that the campaign for gay marriage threatens to turn the gay rights movement, previously a powerful force against the stigmatization of sex, into a tool for the normalization of queer life.

In Chapter Three Warner proposes that by restricting its campaigning to demands for same-sex marriage, the gay rights movement has marginalized and ignored queer counterpublics that it would have served better by presenting a broad range of sexual lives as moral.

In the fourth chapter Warner examines the history of zoning regulation changes in 1990s New York City. He argues that stricter regulation of the city's sex-related businesses represents a trend toward the repression of sex and the "erosion of queer publics." By removing problematic, visible, queer sex from public spaces, Warner argues, these policies relegated sexuality to a private sphere of presumed heterosexuality. The net effect was to heighten hypocrisy over the conduct of sexual relationships, supporting the impression that the best any sexuality campaigner can aspire to is admission to a limited sphere of normality that is politically sanctioned, but also deliberately placed outside the sphere of the politically debatable.

In the final chapter, Warner challenges the assertion, made by gay authors like Larry Kramer, that sexual recklessness is to blame for continuing cases of HIV infection. Warner argues that, on the contrary, the political use of shame to stigmatize certain kinds of sexual activity actually puts more people at risk of contracting HIV and developing AIDS, by marginalizing those in at-risk communities and restricting access to condoms and safer sex advice. He also criticizes abstinence-only sex education as "an appalling insult to gay men and lesbians among others" and an inadequate response to the problems of public sexual health, asserting that "shame and stigma are often among the most intractable dimensions of risk."

== Commercial and critical reception ==
As the Library Journal noted, The Trouble With Normal was sometimes construed as a straightforward response to Andrew Sullivan's 1995 Virtually Normal. David Bell, in Contemporary Sociology, accordingly characterized The Trouble with Normal as a move in the "assimilationist debates", over the extent to which gay people should aspire to 'normality', that characterized 1990s and 2000s gay rights activism. In these debates Warner was ranged against Andrew Sullivan and Larry Kramer, who argued that the most radical goals the movement could seek were the acceptance of gay life into the political and cultural mainstream, through rights like marriage. Warner insisted that, on the contrary, queer people were ideally positioned to critique and challenge mainstream institutions and should not settle for mere tolerance. The debate was impassioned; Warner told the Guardian that "This Fifties version of how gay life should be that we've been handed is actually not making a lot of people happy", while Sullivan asked "What could be more boring than to still be referring to yourself as "queer"?" In 2003 the Library Journal described Warner's book as a classic in the field of the debate on normalcy.

Queer theorist Judith Butler, with whose idea of the necessarily transgressive nature of queerness Warner takes issue, called the book "brave and timely", applauding its analysis of sexual shame and noting that "one may not concur with every word, but everyone will attest to the power and necessity of the invaluable critical voice offered here." The philosopher Martha Nussbaum, writing in The New Republic, praised the book's moral opposition to "the domination of the 'normal': "Warner is a deft and thoughtful writer who turns his own experience of the margins into a source of genuine understanding about America and its sexual politics...what Warner's book finally demands of us is...genuine reflection." Nussbaum later called the book "clearly written and argued, insightful about human life, and valuable both in its theoretical analysis and its recommendations for practice."

Kirkus Reviews praised the "lapidary skill" with which the book criticized heteronormativity, but objected to its emphasis on the need for an already marginalized gay community to change: "Telling gay people that, for various ethical reasons, they shouldn't even want to marry, when they already can't, does not change the fact that laws that enfranchise some while disenfranchising others are discriminatory. Warner's rhetoric persuasively reveals the hierarchical parameters of marriage and the constraints of normalcy, but a more universal approach to his topic would delineate the limitations of marriage for all people, not just queer people. In the end, his polemic leaves standing discriminatory treatment of queers for the sake of a theoretical attack on normalcy."

== Release details ==
Publishers Weekly noted that, though The Trouble with Normal engaged with a broad social context through its analysis of the Clinton affair, the degree to which Warner criticized the positions of gay advocates Kramer, Michelangelo Signorile, and William Eskridge "positions his arguments as an intra-community fight and may limit his readership." The Library Journal recommended the book as a "provocative polemic" for "specialized collections". The New York Times characterized Warner as one of the Free Press's "contrarian" writers, quoting editorial director Elizabeth Macguire as noting that the book's anti-mainstream message had not been universally popular at the publishing house, but insisting that "If you don't embrace a book, really believe you produced with the author a good book, it doesn't work. That doesn't have much to do with ideology."

=== Editions ===
- Michael Warner (1999). The Trouble with Normal (hardback). The Free Press. p. 227. ISBN 0-684-86529-7.
- Michael Warner (2000). The Trouble with Normal (paperback). Harvard University Press. p. 227. ISBN 0-674-00441-8.

== See also ==
- Times Square Red, Times Square Blue
