= Mark Schoofs =

American journalist

- Born: East Chicago, Indiana, U.S.
- Education: Yale University
- Occupation: Journalist

Mark Schoofs is an American Pulitzer Prize-winning journalist and was the editor-in-chief of BuzzFeed News. He is also a visiting professor at the USC Annenberg School for Communication and Journalism.

== Biography ==
After graduating magna cum laude from Yale University, Mark Schoofs began his journalistic career in the 1990s with the Chicago LGBT newspaper Windy City Times. In 1999, Schoofs spent more than six months on an assignment for The Village Voice in African countries writing an eight-part series of articles on AIDS. A year later, he earned the Pulitzer Prize for his "provocative and enlightening" reporting. Throughout his career, Schoofs also earned the Best Reporting Award from Deadline Club and the New York chapter of the Society of Professional Journalists, Peter Liagor award from Headline Club, and won the Chicago chapter of the Society of Professional Journalists four times. He also has been awarded multiple science journalism awards from the American Association for the Advancement of Science.

In addition to international reporting, Schoofs specialized in cultural essays, art and music reviews, and foreign correspondence from Eastern Europe. His works appeared in The New York Times Magazine, The Washington Post, Esquire, the Advocate, The Paris Courrier International, and other magazines. For example, he reported on frauds in the medical industry. As part of The Wall Street Journal breaking news team that covered the 9/11 attacks from Ground Zero he earned his second Pulitzer for Breaking News Reporting in 2002. Later on, Schoofs worked at ProPublica as an editor of a team of investigative reporters.

In 2014, Schoofs joined BuzzFeed News, where he founded an investigative reporting unit. Under his leadership, the team of more than 20 reporters earned a George Polk Award, a National Magazine Award, a Scripps Howard Award, two British Journalism Awards, and a London Press Club Award. Besides, his team's work was twice named as a finalist for a Pulitzer Prize. Schoofs announced in March 2022 that he would resign from BuzzFeed News as editor-in-chief after more cuts to the newsroom were announced.

Schoofs was appointed professor of journalism at Yale in 2012. He has been a visiting professor at the University of Southern California’s Annenberg School for Communication and Journalism since 2018. He continued to hold this position when he took over as chief editor of BuzzFeed News in the spring of 2020. BuzzFeed News established an internship program for his students, Schoofs also participated in the creation of the summer practice of the Beacon Project.
