= Tribe Magazine =

Former Canadian magazine

Tribe Magazine was a free print magazine dedicated to the club, rave and DJ scene in Canada, mostly focused on the scene in Toronto, Ontario. Founded in 1993 by Alex "Alex D." Dordevic, it was originally distributed in Toronto, as well as across Canada, until 2005. The magazine featured photography, music, CD reviews, and dance and club listings. It currently has an online presence as an internet message board and social network which provides all the functions of the print version.
