= Michael Warner =

American literary critic, social theorist

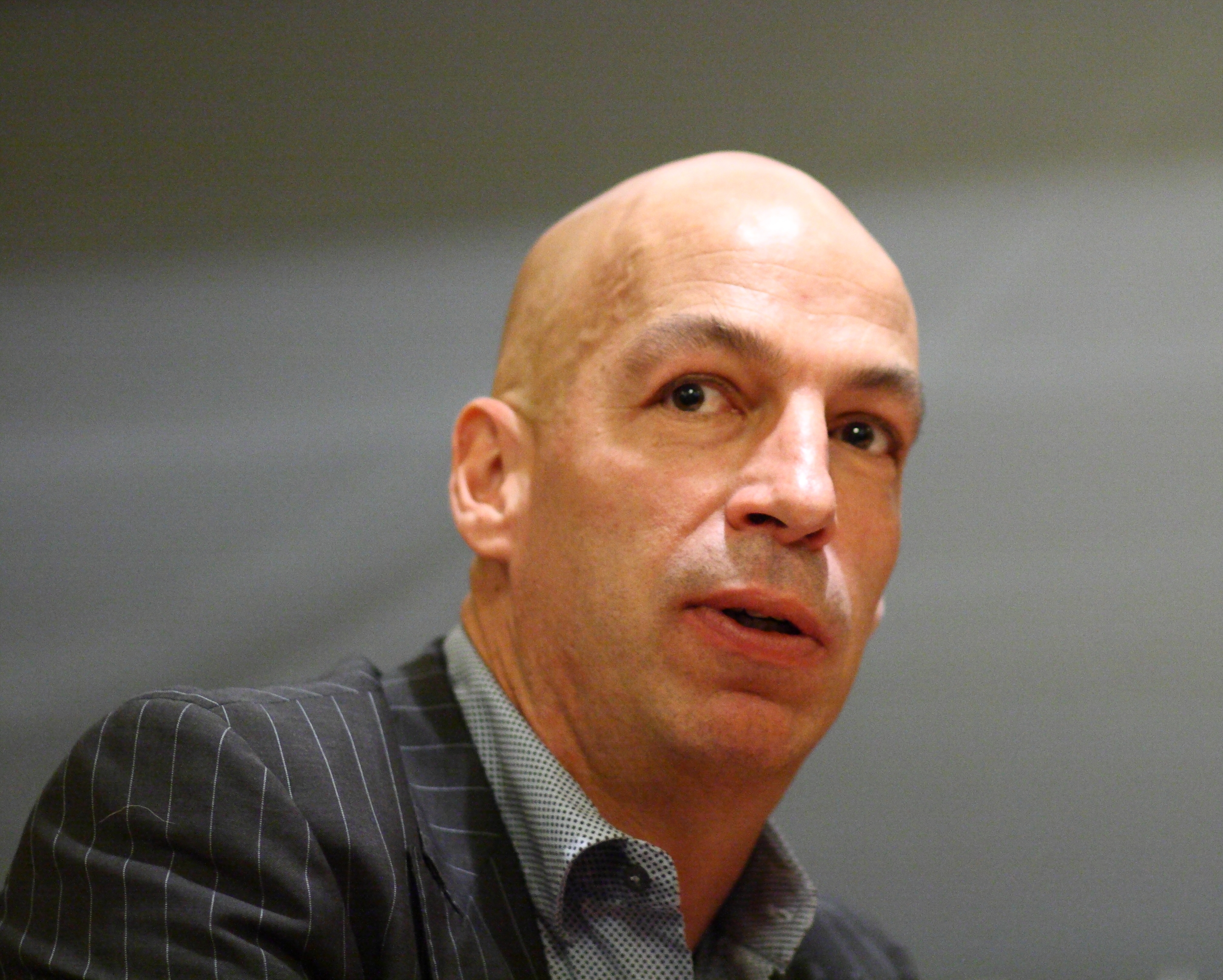
- Born: Michael David Warner; September 9, 1958 (age 68)

Academic background
- Education: University of Wisconsin–Madison; Johns Hopkins University
- Thesis: The Letters of the Republic (1986)

Academic work
- Discipline: Literature; American studies
- Sub-discipline: American literature; literary criticism; queer theory; social theory
- Institutions: Northwestern University; Rutgers University; Yale University
- Notable works: The Trouble with Normal (1999); Publics and Counterpublics (2002)

Michael David Warner (born 1958) is an American literary critic, social theorist, and Seymour H. Knox Professor of English Literature and American Studies at Yale University. He also writes for Artforum, The Nation, The Advocate, and The Village Voice. He is the author of Publics and Counterpublics, The Trouble with Normal: Sex, Politics, and the Ethics of Queer Life, The English Literatures of America, 1500–1800, Fear of a Queer Planet, and The Letters of the Republic. He edited The Portable Walt Whitman and American Sermons: The Pilgrims to Martin Luther King, Jr.

== Biography ==
Born September 9, 1958, Warner received two Master of Arts degrees, from the University of Wisconsin–Madison and Johns Hopkins University, in 1981 and 1983 respectively. He received his Doctor of Philosophy degree in English from Johns Hopkins University in 1986. Warner assumed his position at Yale University in 2007, and became Seymour H. Knox Professor of English Literature and American studies in 2008. Prior to his work at Yale, he taught at Northwestern University (1985–1990) and Rutgers University (1990–2007).

Warner is highly influential in the fields of early American literature, social theory, and queer theory. His first book, The Letters of the Republic: Publication and the Public Sphere in Eighteenth-Century America, established him as a leading scholar in Early American literature, print culture, and public sphere theory. He later became a public figure in the gay community for his book The Trouble with Normal, in which Warner contended that queer theory and the ethics of a queer life serve as critiques of existing social and economic structures, not just as critique of heterosexuality and heterosexual society. In 2002, he published Publics and Counterpublics, which is a collection of essays on the politics of communication in advanced capitalistic societies, or Habermasian public sphere theory.

Warner then edited a book on the history of secularism in early America, from the early eighteenth century to the Civil War, culminating with the work of Walt Whitman, a writer on whom many of his interests converge.

Warner has been a permanent fellow of Rutgers University's Center for Critical Analysis of Contemporary Culture since 2001, and was a director from 2006 to 2008. He also sits on a number of Advisory Boards, including that of the Center for Lesbian and Gay Studies (since 1999), the Society for the Humanities at Cornell University (since 2003), and the Library of America Colonial Writing Project (since 2005).

Warner is, along with Eve Kosofsky Sedgwick, Teresa de Lauretis, (Note: De Lauretis coined the term queer theory although the way in which it is used today differs from what she originally suggested by the term.) Lauren Berlant, and Judith Butler, considered one of the founders of queer theory.

== Overview of major works ==
=== The Trouble With Normal ===
In The Trouble With Normal, Warner critiques same-sex marriage activism and other moves more generally by the gay rights movement toward equality in normalcy. The book has been described as a classic of the debates on normalcy as a goal for the gay rights movement, and as an important contribution to queer theory. Martha Nussbaum, writing in the New Republic, praised the book's moral opposition to "the domination of the 'normal'": "Warner is a deft and thoughtful writer who turns his own experience of the margins into a source of genuine understanding about America and its sexual politics...what Warner's book finally demands of us is...genuine reflection." First published in 1999 by The Free Press, an imprint of Simon and Schuster, it was re-published in 2000 in paperback by Harvard University Press. Warner argues that the right to marry is an inadequate and ultimately undesirable goal for gay rights activism. Chapter one, "The Ethics of Sexual Shame", argues that people with deviant sexualities have been shamed, as a result of American society's relegation of sex to the private domain, where it is not talked about. It provides a list of sexual hierarchies, as well as discussion of stigma, shame, moral panics, and queer life. Chapter two, "What's Wrong with Normal?", critiques the notion of normalcy. In this chapter, Warner looks at the arguments of Georges Canguilhem and Alfred Kinsey to discuss issues with the concept of norms and "The Normalized Movement" within gay rights activism. Chapter three, "Beyond Gay Marriage", takes the concepts from chapter two to argue against same-sex marriage, and marriage as an institution that reinforces privacy and diminishes the queer counterpublic. Chapter four, "Zoning Out Sex", discusses the zoning laws put in place by New York City Mayor Rudy Giuliani. These laws were also critiqued in the article Warner co-wrote with Lauren Berlant in 1998, titled "Sex in Public". The conclusion "The Politics of Shame and HIV Prevention", discusses some of the health strategies of fighting HIV/AIDS, and how the cycle of shame increases the risk of spreading the disease. The book, according to Kirkus Reviews, argues "persuasively" against same-sex marriage.

=== Publics and Counterpublics ===
Publics and Counterpublics is a collection of essays based around the central question "what is a public?" Around half of the essays in the book have been published previously. Chapter one, "Public and Private", reviews the definitions of these terms, and traces the history of debates around public and private spheres, particularly around the women's liberation, and then the gay rights, movements. Chapter two, "Publics and Counterpublics", looks at redefining and expanding upon the term public, to introduce multiple publics. The chapter then introduces the concept of counterpublics, initially termed by Nancy Fraser to mean a public that is subordinate to a dominant public. Chapter three, "Styles of Intellectual Publics", considers the style of discourse in academic work and the impact this has on the type of public it creates. It suggests that Michel Foucault might have described intellectual work as a counterpublic, and discusses this possibility. Chapter four, "The Mass Public and the Mass Subject", responds to Jürgen Habermas' The Structural Transformation of the Public Sphere introducing some of the concepts we now regard as queer theory. As the essay was originally published in 1989, it was written before the term queer theory had become widely used. Chapter five, "Sex in Public", was co-written with Lauren Berlant, and published previously in 1998. "Sex in Public" serves as a case study in the struggles over the mediation of publics, and is very similar, thematically, to The Trouble With Normal. Chapter six, "Something Queer About the Nation State", discusses queer politics and activism, and its relationship to the state. Chapter seven, "A Soliloquy 'Lately Spoken at the African Theatre': Race and the Public Sphere in New York City, 1821", considers an historical counterpublic and its context, and the texts that upheld it. Chapter eight, "Whitman Drunk" critiques Walt Whitman's work Franklin Evans and its reception in the context of temperance activism.

Publics and Counterpublics, argues fellow queer theorist Ken Plummer, extended the public/private debate and contributed to the development of queer theory.

Both of these major works discuss to some extent how queer straddles the public/private divide. The Trouble With Normal argues that the gay rights struggle for marriage equality is a struggle for normalcy, and privacy. This privacy, Warner argues, comes at the cost of those who do not marry, who choose to conduct themselves in public. Publics and Counterpublics considers the public sphere and its shortcomings, before considering how queer both exists in, and is subordinated by, publics. Warner calls the two books "mutually illustrative", with The Trouble With Normal critiquing the way gay rights movements have obscured queer counterpublics, one of the central concepts of Public and Counterpublics.

== Works ==
=== Books ===
- The Evangelical Public Sphere in Eighteenth-Century America (University of Pennsylvania Press, under contract).
- Publics and Counterpublics (Cambridge: Zone Books, 2002).
- The Trouble with Normal (New York: The Free Press, 1999; Cambridge: Harvard Univ. Press, 2000).
- The Letters of the Republic: Publication and the Public Sphere in Eighteenth-Century America (Cambridge: Harvard University Press, 1990).

=== Edited volumes ===
- Varieties of Secularism in a Secular Age (Harvard University Press, 2010) with Craig Calhoun and Jonathan VanAntwerpen
- The Portable Walt Whitman, Edited by Michael Warner (New York: Penguin, 2003).
- American Sermons: The Pilgrims to Martin Luther King, Jr. (New York: Library of America, 1999).
- The English Literatures of America (Routledge, 1997) with Myra Jehlen.
- Fear of a Queer Planet: Queer Politics and Social Theory (Minneapolis: University of Minnesota Press, 1993).
- The Origins of Literary Studies in America: A Documentary Anthology (New York: Routledge, 1988) with Gerald Graff

=== Articles ===
- "Pleasures and Dangers of Shame," in David Halperin and Valerie Traub, eds., Gay Shame (University of Chicago Press, 2010).
- "Is Liberalism a Religion?" in Hent de Vries, ed., Religion: Beyond a Concept (New York: Fordham Univ. Press, 2008), pp. 610–17.
- "Secularism," in Bruce Burgett and Glenn Hendler, eds., Keywords: A Vocabulary of American Cultural Studies (New York Univ. Press, 2007), pp. 209–212.
- "Uncritical Reading," in Jane Gallop, ed., Polemics (New York: Routledge, 2004), pp. 13–38.
- "What Like a Bullet Can Undeceive?" Public Culture, vol. 15, no. 1 (Winter 2003), pp. 41– 54.
- "Publics and Counterpublics," Public Culture, vol. 14. no. 1 (Winter 2002), pp. 49–90.
- "Styles of Intellectual Publics," in Jonathan Culler, ed., Just Being Difficult? Academic Writing in the Public Arena (Stanford: Stanford Univ. Press, 2003).
- "A Soliloquy 'Lately Spoken at the African Theatre': Race and the Public Sphere in New York City, 1821," American Literature 73.1 (March 2001), pp. 1–46.

Awarded the Foerster Prize for best essay in American Literature, 2001.

- "Irving's Posterity," ELH 67 (2000), pp. 773–799.
- "Normal and Normaller: Beyond Gay Marriage," GLQ 5.2 (Winter 1999).
- "Public and Private," in Catharine Stimpson and Gil Herdt, eds., Critical Terms for the Study of Gender and Sexuality (University of Chicago Press, forthcoming).
- "Zones of Privacy," in Judith Butler, John Guillory, and Kendall Thomas, eds., What's Left of Theory? (New York: Routledge, 2000), pp. 75–113.
- "What's Colonial About Colonial America?" in Robert St. George, ed., Possible Pasts: Becoming Colonial in Early America (Cornell Univ. Press, 2000), pp. 49–70.
- with Lauren Berlant, "Sex in Public," Critical Inquiry 24.2 (Winter 1998), pp. 547–66.
- "Whitman Drunk," in Betsy Erkkila and Jay Grossman, eds., Breaking Bounds (Oxford Univ. Press, 1996), pp. 30–43.
- with Lauren Berlant, "What Does Queer Theory Teach Us About X?" PMLA 110.3 (May 1995), pp. 343–49.
- with Lauren Berlant, "Introduction to 'Critical Multiculturalism,'" in David Theo Goldberg, ed., Multiculturalism: A Critical Reader (Oxford: Basil Blackwell, 1994), pp. 107–113.
- "No Special Rights," in Michael Bérubé and Cary Nelson, eds., Higher Education Under Fire (New York: Routledge, 1995), pp. 284–93.
- "Something Queer About the Nation-State," in Alphabet City, December 1993.
- "Savage Franklin," in Gianfranca Balestra and Luigi Sammpietro, eds., Benjamin Franklin: An American Genius, (Rome: Bulzoni Editore, 1993).
- "The Public Sphere and the Cultural Mediation of Print," in William S. Solomon and Robert W. McChesney, eds., Ruthless Criticism: New Perspectives in U. S. Communication History (Minneapolis: Univ. of Minnesota Press, 1993), pp. 7–37.
- "Publication and the Public Sphere," in Carol Armbruster, eds., Publishing and Readership in Revolutionary France and America, (Westport: Greenwood, 1993), pp. 167–74.
- "Critical Multiculturalism," coauthored by the Chicago Cultural Studies Group, 18.3 (Spring 1992), pp. 530–55.
- "New English Sodom," American Literature 64.1 (March 1992), pp. 19–47.

Awarded the Foerster Prize for the best essay in American Literature, 1992; awarded the Crompton-Noll Award for best essay in lesbian and gay studies, 1993.

- "Thoreau's Bottom," Raritan 11.3 (Winter 1992), pp. 53–79.
- "The Mass Public and the Mass Subject," in Craig Calhoun, ed., Habermas and the Public Sphere (Cambridge: MIT Press, 1991), pp. 377–401.
- "Fear of a Queer Planet," Social Text 29 (1991), pp 3–17.
- "Walden's Erotic Economy," in Hortense Spillers, ed., Comparative American Identities: Race, Sex and Nationality in the Modern Text, (New York: Routledge, 1991), pp. 157–74.
- "Homo-Narcissism; Or, Heterosexuality," in Joseph A. Boone and Michael Cadden, eds., Engendering Men (New York: Routledge, 1990), pp. 190–206.
- "The Res Publica of Letters," boundary 2 17.1 (Spring 1990), pp. 38–68.
- "Textuality and Legitimacy in the Printed Constitution," Proceedings of the American Antiquarian Society 97(1):59–84. 1987
- "Franklin and the Letters of the Republic," Representations 16 (1986), pp. 110–30.
- "Literary Studies and the History of the Book," The Book: Newsletter of the Program of the History of the Book in American Culture, 12 (July 1987), pp. 3–9.
- "Professionalization and the Rewards of Literature: 1875-1900," Criticism 27 (Winter 1985), pp. 1–28.
- "Value, Agency, and Stephen Crane's `The Monster,'" Nineteenth-Century Fiction 40 (June 1985), pp. 76–93.

== Awards ==
- 2009 A.S.W. Rosenbach Lectures in Bibliography-"The Evangelical Public Sphere"
- 2001: Foerster Prize for Best Essay in American Literature
- 1993: Crompton-Noll Award for Best Essay in Lesbian and Gay Studies
- 1992: Foerster Prize for Best Essay in American Literature
- 1988: Outstanding Teacher Award, Northwestern University
