= Sarah Pettit =

American journalist, lgbt rights activist and editor

Sarah Pettit (6 August 1966 – 22 January 2003) was an American journalist, LGBTQ+ rights activist, and editor. She was known for being the founding editor of Out Magazine alongside Michael Goff.

== Early life ==
Pettit was born in Amsterdam, Noord-Holland, Netherlands where her father worked as a banker for an international banking corporation. She was raised in Paris, London, and Bad Homburg, Germany. She went to Phillips Exeter Academy and then earned a bachelor's degree at Yale University, in Comparative Literature in French and German in 1988.

Pettit's activism began while at Yale, where she was instrumental in successful student efforts to add sexual orientation to the university's nondiscrimination clause.

== Career ==
After a brief stint working for Michael Denneny at St. Martin's Press, Pettit's publishing career ramped up in 1989 when she became the arts editor for OutWeek a controversial weekly gay and lesbian magazine that stirred national debates for its tactics around gay rights activism and “outing” public figures. Pettit remained at OutWeek until it closed in 1991.

In 1992, she joined Michael Goff to create Out magazine, where she extended the magazine's cultural and political focus, attracting an unprecedented range of advertisers, like Calvin Klein and General Motors, that had not previously appeared in gay publications.

She was hired by Newsweek as their senior editor for arts and entertainment in 1998, a role she held until her death in 2003. Curve said she is “widely remembered as one of the most influential lesbian journalists of our time. She spoke often and forcefully on queer issues to prominent media outlets such as CNN, MSNBC and ABC's Nightline. As a journalist during a critical point in U.S. queer history, Pettit quickly earned a reputation for unabashedly -- and often forcefully -- confronting political and social controversy, including radical AIDS activism, outing, the politics of safe sex, and lesbians and the medical establishment.”

== Death and legacy ==
Pettit died on January 22, 2003, in New York City, due complications with lymphoma diagnosed less than a year before. Yale offers a doctoral fellowship in lesbian studies named for Pettit. The Association of LGBTQ+ Journalists (NLGJA) awards the Sarah Pettit Memorial Award for the LGBTQ Journalist of the Year for journalists contributing in LGBTQ media publications.
