= Out (magazine) =

American LGBTQ magazine

- Issue No. 1, Summer 1992
- Editor: Daniel Reynolds
- Categories: LGBTQ, news, entertainment, fashion, lifestyle
- Frequency: Monthly
- Circulation: 203,000 (includes digital as well as print)
- Publisher: Joe Landry
- Founded: 1992
- Company: Pride Media
- Country: United States
- Language: English
- Website: out.com
- ISSN: 1062-7928

Out is an American LGBTQ news, fashion, entertainment, and lifestyle magazine, with the highest circulation of any LGBTQ monthly publication in the United States. Out was owned by Robert Hardman of Boston, its original investor, until 2000. It then changed hands among LPI Media, PlanetOut Inc., Here Media, and Pride Media. In June 2022, Pride Media was acquired by Equal Entertainment LLC, taking on the name Equal Pride.

Out is known for the Out100, its annual list of the most "impactful and influential LGBTQ+ people".

== History ==
Out was founded by Michael Goff in 1992 as editor in chief and president. The executive editor was Sarah Pettit (since deceased). In 1996, owner Robert Hardman fired Goff and hired Henry E. (Hank) Scott, a former New York Times Co. executive, as president of Out Publishing Inc., with the charge to rescue the financially troubled magazine company. When Scott joined Out, the company had annual revenues of less than $4 million and expenses of $7 million. Scott changed Out's LGBT focus, arguing that gay men and lesbians had little in common other than political and legal issues. He fired Pettit and hired James Collard, editor of Attitude, a gay magazine published in the UK, to refocus Out on an affluent and style-conscious gay male audience. Audited circulation grew by 67 percent to over 130,000 and the household income of the average Out reader, as measured by MRI, grew from $70,000 a year to $90,000 a year. With the help of Lou Fabrizio, a senior advertising executive whom Scott hired from The New York Times, Out began attracting major fashion advertisers and brands such as Saturn, which previously had not advertised in gay publications. Three years after Scott took control of Out, it had tripled its revenue and become the largest-circulation gay magazine in US history. Those changes positioned the publication for a sale by Hardman to LPI Media in 2000.

In 2001 the circulation was 100,000. Judy Wieder, who was the first female editor in chief of The Advocate, became the first female editorial director of Out. By 2006, when the magazine was acquired by PlanetOut, Out's circulation had reached 130,000. Out attracted international attention when it published its debut Power Issue in May 2007, with a cover that featured two models wearing masks of journalist Anderson Cooper and actor Jodie Foster above the cover line, "The Glass Closet". Some lesbians have criticized Out for primarily focusing on gay men. A writer for the website AfterEllen noted that in 2008, no lesbians were featured on the magazine's cover, and that only 22% of the persons featured in the Out100 were lesbians.

In 2008, Out, along with its sister publication The Advocate, was purchased by Here Media Inc. Here Media expanded the magazine's web presence, OUT.com, and added a mobile application. In April 2012, Out laid off the twelve members of its editorial staff with one month severance; editor-in-chief Aaron Hicklin said he intended to hire back most of them as contractors with his new company Grand Editorial.

In 2017, Here Media sold its magazine operations to a group led by Oreva Capital, who renamed the parent company Pride Media. In August 2018, Hicklin stepped down after 12 years as editor-in-chief and was replaced by Phillip Picardi.

Despite editorial changes, Out and Pride still faced financial issues and frequent complaints from freelancers and contract employees. In February 2019, Women's Wear Daily reported that more than forty contributors wrote an open letter to Pride Media and Oreva Capital, its operating entity, as well as its former editorial management partners Grand Editorial and McCarthy LLC, demanding payment for past work. They filed a nonpayment grievance via the National Writers Union. "The National Writers Union is now representing 25 freelance contributors to Out magazine, who are owed more than $40,000 for work that was contracted, produced and published," the union said in a statement. The New York Times detailed the nonpayment issues and that the total owed was in excess of $100,000. The New York Post reported Pride Media owed more than $100,000 in unpaid ad commissions to PinkNews, a London-based digital publisher catering to the global LGBT audience.

In December 2018, Raquel Willis was appointed as executive editor, becoming the first trans woman to take on a leadership position at the publication. While at Out, Willis won a GLAAD Media Award for Outstanding Magazine Article for "The Trans Obituaries Project".

Picardi left Out in December 2019, announcing his abrupt departure via Twitter. In September 2020, David Artavia was appointed as the magazine's new editor-in-chief. In January 2020, Diane Anderson-Minshall was named CEO of Pride Media and later that year became the editorial director of Out. In June 2022, Equal Entertainment—the largest LGBTQ-owned media company in the United States—acquired Pride Media and took on the name Equal Pride.

== Out100 ==
Since its beginning, Out offered an annual list, the Out100, documenting a hundred "influential, inspirational" LGBTQ personalities and celebrities and "founded to celebrate and honor some of the most influential LGBTQIA figures." In conjunction with the listings is the annual Out100 Awards honoring a handful of that year's celebrities with: Ingenue of the Year, Reader's Choice, Artist of the Year, and Entertainer of the Year. In 2019, editor Phillip Picardi said the Out100 was the magazine's "greatest and most well-known tradition". Out introduced a Reader's Choice Award in 2013 in addition to its editorially curated list of the top 100 honorees.

== Notable contributors ==
=== Writers ===
- Bret Easton Ellis
- Josh Kilmer-Purcell
- Dale Peck
- Dan Savage
- Nathan Lee
- T Cooper
- Mark Simpson
- Tim Murphy
- Edmund White
- Jesse Archer
- Bob Smith
- Dustin Lance Black
- Kimberly Drew
- Jenna Wortham
- Ericka Hart
- Chani Nicholas
- Adam Eli
- Diane Anderson-Minshall
- Bernardo Sim
- Mey Rude
- Tracy Gilchrist

=== Photographers ===
- Francois Rousseau
- Roger Erickson
- Ben Watts
- Matthias Vriens
- Cass Bird
- Patrick McMullan
- Joe Opedisano
- Terry Richardson
- Xevi Muntané
- Pierre et Gilles
- Walter Pfeiffer
- Nicholas Wagner
- Mike Ruiz
