= Michael Goff =

American businessman

Michael Goff is a publisher, executive and entrepreneur who founded Out magazine and was its first editor in chief and President. The child of diplomats, Goff himself was rejected by the State Department for being gay.

He later was general manager of Microsoft MSN when it was first taken to the internet. More recently he was Dan Gillmor's partner in citizen journalism company publishing Bayosphere and is involved with many media and tech companies and blogs, including Towleroad.com.
