= Queer Wars =

2005 book by Paul A. Robinson

Queer Wars: The New Gay Right and Its Critics
- Cover of the first edition
- Author: Paul A. Robinson
- Language: English
- Subject: Gay conservatism
- Publisher: University of Chicago Press
- Publication date: 2005
- Publication place: United States
- Media type: Print
- ISBN: 0226722007
- LC Class: HQ76.85 .R63 2005

Queer Wars: The New Gay Right and Its Critics is a 2005 book about gay conservatism by the historian Paul A. Robinson. It received both supportive and critical commentary.

== Summary ==
Robinson examines the views of Bruce Bawer, Andrew Sullivan, Michelangelo Signorile, and Gabriel Rotello, all of whom he characterises as proponents of gay conservatism. He critically evaluates a number of books: Marshall Kirk and Hunter Madsen's After the Ball, Bawer's A Place at the Table, Sullivan's Virtually Normal and Love Undetectable, Urvashi Vaid's Virtual Equality, Michael Warner's The Trouble with Normal, Richard Goldstein's The Attack Queers, Signorile's Queer in America and Life Outside, Rotello's Sexual Ecology, and Eric Rofes's Reviving the Tribe and Dry Bones Breathe. He concludes by analysing the television series Queer as Folk.

== Background and publication history ==
Paul A. Robinson is an American historian. Queer Wars was his twelfth book. It was first published in 2005 by the University of Chicago Press.

== Reception ==
=== Popular press ===
Queer Wars received a positive review from J. Stauder in Choice and negative reviews from Brandon Michael Brod in the Claremont Review of Books and Jeff Ingram in Library Journal. Stauder highly recommended the book, describing it as a tour de force. Brod disputed Robinson's characterisation of Bawer, Signorile, and Rotello as conservatives. He criticised Robinson for writing from a queer activist perspective and for limiting his focus to "sex, gender, and campus politics". Ingram called Queer Wars "a book in search of a subject". He wrote that Robinson had neglected to cover the political leaders of gay conservatism and had focussed instead on "four nearly forgotten authors".

=== Gay press ===
Queer Wars received positive reviews from R. A. Horne in the Lambda Book Report, Yasmin Nair in the Windy City Times, and Jim Nawrocki in the Bay Area Reporter; and a mixed review from Duncan Mitchel in The Gay & Lesbian Review Worldwide.

Horne wrote that the book was "written in clear, spirited and effective English, informed and insightful, and [...] despite incisive criticism of its subject, [it] manages to remain honest and fair". Nair reviewed Queer Wars alongside That's Revolting! Queer Strategies for Resisting Assimilation, an anthology edited by Mattilda Bernstein Sycamore. She found Robinson's characterisation of Signorile and Rotello as conservatives "somewhat surprising", though she appreciated his arguments for including them. She described Queer Wars as "a complex analysis of the histories and legacies of 'queer'". Nawrocki credited Robinson with providing a "thorough, thoughtful, and fair examination" of the emergence of gay conservatism. He praised Queer Wars as "gracefully concise and highly readable".

Mitchel questioned whether the writers whom Robinson characterised as gay conservatives constituted a "coherent intellectual force". He criticised Robinson's account of political divisions within gay activism as oversimplified. Nevertheless, he wrote that "Queer Wars provides a pleasant enough reading experience, and Robinson is a better writer than many of his subjects".

=== Scientific and academic journals ===
Queer Wars received positive reviews from the sociologist John H. Gagnon in Archives of Sexual Behavior and the social work scholar Gerald P. Mallon in The Journal of Sociology & Social Welfare. Gagnon reviewed Queer Wars alongside another work by Robinson, Opera, Sex and Other Vital Matters. He praised Robinson as "a distinguished historian of ideas with a long record of writing thoughtfully about sexuality and sexuality related topics". Mallon highly recommended Queer Wars, applauding Robinson's "skillful analysis of [his subjects'] work grounded in good reasoning and fairness". However, he questioned Robinson's choice to end the book with a discussion of a television show, writing that it "seemed to me to cheapen his accomplishment".

== Bibliography ==
=== Books ===
- Robinson, Paul A. (2005). Queer Wars: The New Gay Right and Its Critics. Chicago: University of Chicago Press. ISBN 0226722007.
- "Robinson, Paul A. 1940–". Contemporary Authors. New Revision Series. Vol. 152. Thomson Gale. 2006. pp. 331–333. ISBN 0-7876-7906-2. ISSN 0275-7176.

=== Periodicals ===
- Araiza, William D. (2008). "Book Reviews". Journal of the History of Sexuality. 17 (2): 301–307. ISSN 1043-4070. JSTOR 30114223.
- Brod, Brandon Michael (Winter 2005–06). "Books in Brief". Claremont Review of Books. Vol. 6, no. 1. ISSN 1554-0839.
- Gagnon, John H. (31 January 2007). "Approaches to the Intellectual of History of Sexuality". Archives of Sexual Behavior. 36 (1): 111–112. doi:10.1007/s10508-006-9118-3. ISSN 0004-0002. S2CID 142364365.
- Horne, R. A. (April–May 2005). "Gay History at Its Best". Lambda Book Report. Vol. 13, no. 9–10. pp. 38–40. ISSN 1048-9487.
- Ingram, Jeff (January 2005). "Social Sciences". Library Journal. Vol. 130, no. 1. p. 136. ISSN 0363-0277.
- Mallon, Gerald P. (1 May 2006). "Book Reviews". The Journal of Sociology & Social Welfare. 33 (2): 161–164. ISSN 0191-5096.
- Mitchel, Duncan (September–October 2005). "One Man's 'Conservative'..." The Gay & Lesbian Review Worldwide. Vol. 12, no. 5. pp. 42–43. ISSN 1532-1118. ProQuest 198669559.
- Nair, Yasmin (22 June 2005). "Books: Queer Wars". Windy City Times. ISSN 1049-698X. Archived from the original on 6 May 2021.
- Nawrocki, Jim (9 December 2004). "Mapping the divide". Bay Area Reporter. Vol. 34, no. 50. pp. 36–37. ISSN 2374-264X.
- Stauder, J. (July–August 2005). "Social & Behavioral Sciences". Choice. Vol. 42, no. 11–12. p. 2026. ISSN 0009-4978.
- Ward, Jane (October 2006). "Book Reviews". Sexualities. 9 (4): 495–497. doi:10.1177/136346070600900408. ISSN 1363-4607. S2CID 142984319.
