= Gay Marriage (Rauch book) =

2004 book by Jonathan Rauch

Gay Marriage: Why It Is Good for Gays, Good for Straights, and Good for America
- Cover of the first edition
- Author: Jonathan Rauch
- Language: English
- Subject: Same-sex marriage
- Publisher: Times Books
- Publication date: 2004
- Publication place: United States
- Media type: Print (hardcover and paperback)
- Pages: 207
- ISBN: 978-0805078152

Gay Marriage: Why It Is Good for Gays, Good for Straights, and Good for America is a 2004 book by the journalist Jonathan Rauch in which the author advocates the legal and social recognition of same-sex marriage.

== Background and publication history ==
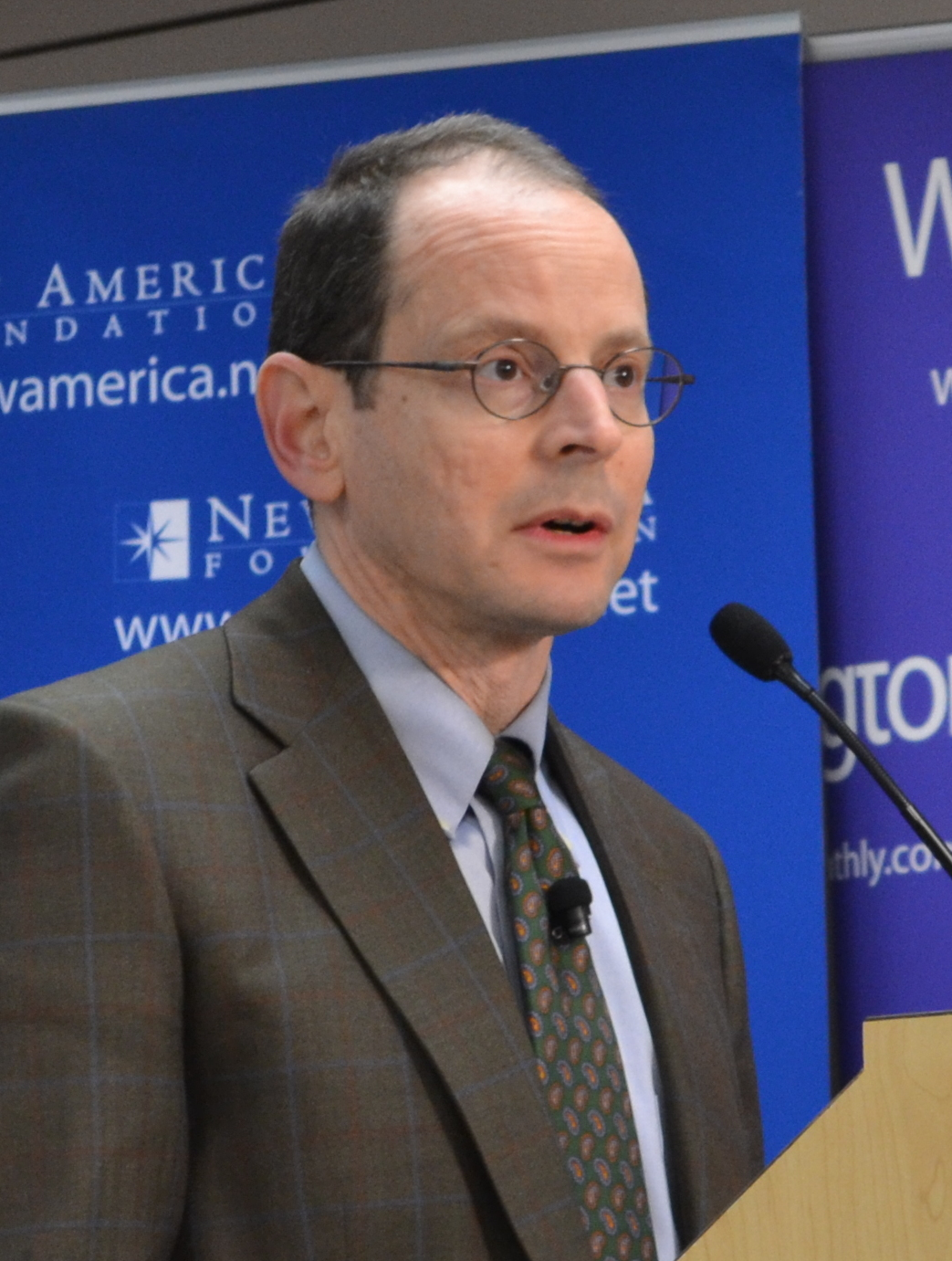
Rauch in 2013

Jonathan Rauch is an American journalist. In 2004, he was a correspondent for The Atlantic and a writer in residence at the Brookings Institution, an American think tank. Gay Marriage was his fifth book. Gay Marriage was first published in April 2004 by Times Books, an imprint of Henry Holt and Company. A paperback edition was issued in 2005 by Owl Books.

== Reception ==
=== Popular press ===
Gay Marriage received positive reviews from Emily Bazelon in the Los Angeles Times Book Review, Robyn E. Blumner in the St. Petersburg Times, Anne Crittenden in The American Prospect, John David Dyche in The Courier-Journal, The Economist, the historian David J. Garrow in The Washington Post Book World, Jonathan Kay in the National Post, Kip Keller in the Austin American-Statesman, and Debra Moore in Library Journal; mixed reviews from Christopher Caldwell in The New York Times Book Review, and Kay Hymowitz in Commentary; and a negative review from Shawn Macomber in The American Spectator.

Bazelon wrote that Rauch "employs a smart and well-timed strategy by appealing to social conservatives on their own terms". She credited him with showing that the arguments against same-sex marriage were "less than compelling". However, she found his view that the advent of same-sex marriage would bring maturity to gay culture and an end to sexual liberation "disconcerting and a bit sad". Blumner praised Rauch as "today's clearest thinker" on the subject of same-sex marriage. She wrote that the book demonstrated that recognising same-sex marriage would benefit conservatives. Crittenden reviewed Gay Marriage alongside Stephanie Coontz's Marriage, a History. She described Rauch's book as "a reasoned, informed, and passionately persuasive polemic". She commented that Rauch's defense of marriage over "marriage-lite" alternatives had led her to reassess her own support for civil partnerships.

Dyche wrote that Rauch had addressed objections to same-sex marriage with "disciplined logic and unfailing humility". He predicted that the book would have historical significance. A reviewer for The Economist praised Gay Marriage as "a powerful book, clear, tolerant, and persuasive, never ranting or self-pitying". The reviewer credited Rauch with refuting all the arguments against same-sex marriage, and recommended that the book "become obligatory reading for all". Garrow reviewed Gay Marriage alongside David Moats' Civil Wars: A Battle for Gay Marriage. He called Rauch's book "as enthusiastic an encomium to marriage as anyone, gay or straight, could write". He suggested that Rauch was too polite to his opponents, who Garrow believed held "a racist-like loathing of gay people as innately inferior".

Kay remarked that Rauch "takes marriage very, very seriously—far more so, it seems, than most straights". He agreed that recognising same-sex marriage would lead to changes in gay culture—in his view, married gay people would embrace a "boring" and "bourgeois" way of life. Keller wrote that Rauch was correct to avoid legalistic, constitution-based arguments, which Keller found generally unconvincing. He commended Rauch's argument that same-sex marriage would benefit society, stating "From now on, any legitimate debate about gay marriage will have to take account of the case Rauch makes here." Moore reviewed Gay Marriage alongside Gerald P. Mallon's Gay Men Choosing Parenthood. She suggested that Rauch had a "remarkably rosy" understanding of marriage and had largely overlooked lesbians. Nevertheless, she recommended Gay Marriage to all libraries, describing it as "a timely and readable book that will provoke people on both sides of the argument".

Caldwell called Gay Marriage "a closely argued new polemic". He credited Rauch with "an appealing combination of prosecutorial logic and gentlemanly forbearance", but wrote that Rauch's comments on polygamy and on the stabilising influence of marriage "do not close any arguments". He believed that Rauch was unreasonable to dismiss the argument that procreation and childrearing were important to marriage. He expressed doubt that the same-sex marriage movement would "shore up" marriage as an institution. Hymowitz wrote that the book was "smart, reasoned, at points affecting", but ultimately unconvincing. She credited Rauch with "a sophisticated grasp of matrimony as an institution that shapes behavior and provides vital social goods", but faulted his treatment of the relation between marriage and children. Macomber found it "fascinatingly counterintuitive" that Rauch would portray himself and the gay community as "the true defenders of marriage". He wrote that Rauch's proposal to introduce same-sex marriage state-by-state, on a trial basis, was inconsistent with Rauch's view of same-sex marriage as a civil right. He believed that Rauch was incorrect to reject the libertarian solution of marriage privatization.

=== Gay press ===
Gay Marriage received positive reviews from Teresa DeCrescenzo in Lesbian News, Edward Olivera in the Lambda Book Report, and the Washington Blade; and a negative review from E. J. Graff in Out. DeCrescenzo reviewed Gay Marriage alongside Davina Kotulski's Why You Should Give a Damn About Gay Marriage and Moats' Civil Wars, calling Rauch's book "by far the best of the lot". She wrote that Gay Marriage "turns opponents' own conservative arguments on them". Olivera praised the book as "a carefully reasoned polemic". He agreed with Rauch that the recognition of same-sex marriage in the United States should proceed on a state-by-state basis. A reviewer for the Washington Blade described Gay Marriage as a "deft and nimble work", written in a "breezy, detailed yet uncluttered style". The reviewer suggested that Rauch had overlooked the question of marriage portability: whether one state should recognise same-sex marriages contracted in another. Graff accused Rauch of misrepresenting her own book on marriage, What Is Marriage For? She criticized the argument that same-sex marriage would "domesticate" gay men.

=== Academic journals ===
Andrew Lister reviewed Gay Marriage in Polity, the journal of the Northeastern Political Science Association. Lister wrote that he, like Rauch, wished to preserve the special status of civil marriage. Nevertheless, he believed that Rauch had failed to consider how this special status might conflict with the liberal values of "civic equality and individual freedom".

=== Other evaluations ===
In April 2004, the American Enterprise Institute hosted a symposium on Gay Marriage featuring Rauch, the philosopher Michael Novak, and the political scientist Charles Murray. Essays by the philosopher Susan M. Shell, as well as Rauch, Novak, and Murray, subsequently appeared in the institute's journal, The Public Interest.
