= While Europe Slept =

2006 book by Bruce Bawer

While Europe Slept: How Radical Islam is Destroying the West from Within
- The book cover for the 1st edition
- Author: Bruce Bawer
- Language: English
- Publisher: Doubleday
- Publication date: February 21, 2006
- Publication place: United States
- Media type: Print (hardcover)
- Pages: 256
- ISBN: 0-385-51472-7
- LC Class: D1056.2.M87 B39

While Europe Slept: How Radical Islam is Destroying the West from Within is a 2006 book by Bruce Bawer. It was Bawer's second book dealing with the issue of religious fundamentalism, following his earlier Stealing Jesus: How Fundamentalism Betrays Christianity, a critique of fundamentalist Christianity published in 1998.

While Europe Slept argues that Europe's democratic traditions and open society face a growing demographic and cultural threat from Europe's Muslim immigrant communities, who according to Bawer reject Enlightenment values and resist integration. Bawer blames this trend primarily on an alleged "self-destructive passivity" among Europeans, whom he regards as "appeasing" essentially incompatible philosophies like radical Islam in the name of religious tolerance. Bawer compares this approach unfavorably with what he sees as a more robust American tradition which proudly asserts its values and expects immigrants to adopt them.

The book received mixed reviews, with some strongly supporting its arguments while others rejected or even ridiculed them. Some felt the book raised important questions but failed to adequately make its case.

The book received a 2006 nomination in the "Criticism" category from the National Book Critics Circle, a choice which was met with condemnation from two former members of the organization.

== Book summary ==
While Europe Slept advances two central arguments: firstly, that Europe faces a growing cultural and demographic threat from its Muslim immigrant population; and secondly, that Europe's political and intellectual leadership is exacerbating the threat by failing to encourage immigrants to fully integrate into the wider society. Bawer's argument is summarized by one of the book's reviewers thus:

European governments subscribe to the worst kind of political correctness, Bawer writes. From Norway to Italy, governments shower immigrants with benefits, yet corral them into ghettos, prevent them from becoming real citizens and turn a blind eye to Muslim attacks on women, Jews and gays, he says.

Bawer hints at a coming cataclysm. "Immigrants to Europe bring with them many tribal customs that are flagrantly inconsistent with a Western understanding of human rights", he writes. "These customs represent flashpoints of latent or potential conflict between the Muslim immigrant communities and their host societies."

Bawer blames the problem not only on Muslims, but on what he implies is a latent bigotry amongst Europeans, which leads them to marginalize and isolate immigrant communities in the name of multiculturalism. He compares this approach unfavorably with what he sees as the American "melting pot" tradition, in which immigrants are expected to adopt American values and fully integrate into the wider society.

Due to what he asserts is a rapidly growing Muslim demographic, Bawer foresees "a long twilight of Balkanization with Europe divided into warring pockets of Muslims and non-Muslims." Bawer warns that without a change of direction, Europe may eventually face a stark choice between "cultural surrender or full-fledged civil war."

Bawer also believes that anti-Americanism has led Europe to reject America's hard line on Islamic extremism and tolerate dangerous pockets of radical Islam in its midst:

In the end, Europe's enemy is not Islam, or even radical Islam. Europe's enemy is itself—its self-destructive passivity, its softness toward tyranny, its reflexive inclination to appease, and its uncomprehending distaste for America's pride, courage, and resolve in the face of a deadly foe.

== Critical reception ==
According to Public Eye magazine, reviews of While Europe Slept were "easily sorted along ideological grounds", with conservatives generally praising the book while liberals repudiated it. Some critics suggested that the book raised important or timely questions, but criticized its methodology and/or conclusions.

In an article published in The Wall Street Journal, Walter Laqueur writes that "While Europe Slept is an angry book, well written and well informed. And it could not, of course, be more timely." J. Peder Zane of the National Book Critics Circle wrote that the book offers "urgent prose that challenges widely held ideas" in addition to "provocative—and controversial—arguments".

Zane thinks the book "begs innumerable qualifications" when it bluntly states that "European Muslims are hostile to 'pluralism, tolerance, democracy and sexual equality'", but believes that Bawer addresses those qualifications. Zane suggests that Bawer, who is openly gay, is concerned about what could happen to European gay communities if Islamists succeed in establishing Sharia law that is hostile to homosexuals.

Although Zane believes that drawing conclusions based upon "anecdotes" "is always dicey", he concedes that "Bawer catalogs many incidents in which officials excuse Muslim rapists because their Western victims 'dressed provocatively,' attribute gay-bashing incidents to general anger at 'oppression' and anti-Semitic violence to Israel's treatment of the Palestinians."

Some reviewers strongly criticized the book. Denis Staunton wrote in The Irish Times that "Bawer will do anything to discover the dark side of Muslims in Europe, whom he accuses of everything from swindling the welfare system to supporting terrorists." Simon Kuper, in the Financial Times, described the book's central "Eurabia" thesis as "ludicrous".

According to Kuper, Bawer's book, like others of its kind, "start with disclaimers that not all Muslims support terrorist jihad. This is then swiftly forgotten as the plans for jihad in Europe are outlined." Kuper rejects the claim that Muslims are any kind of demographic threat, asserting that Muslims comprise "less than 4 percent" of the EU population, and that their allegedly high birth rates are rapidly falling into line with that of other Europeans. Like a number of other reviewers, Kuper complains that Bawer's book is poorly documented: "Any source will do: Bawer cites [Bat] Ye'or, an Amsterdam taxi driver, a woman in a Swedish bar, or often no source at all." He concludes that the "target market" for such books "seems to be the US ... because hardly anybody who actually lives in Europe could take these dystopias seriously."

A review in The Economist suggests that Bawer's homosexuality "may have sensitized him to the clash brewing between immigrant communities, who by and large reject European attitudes toward women and sexuality, and native Europeans for whom such cultural liberalism has become a core value." Noting that Bawer "understands the importance" of distinguishing between moderate Muslims and radicals, The Economist continues:

In practice, though, he seems incapable of maintaining the distinction for long. On one page, he approvingly quotes a Muslim liberal who says, "There's a big difference between a Muslim and an Islamist, just as big a difference as between a German and a Nazi." A few pages later, he uses wildly exaggerated statistics to give warning that Muslim birth rates will soon turn Europe into "Eurabia". The Muslim share of Switzerland's population is not an "astonishing 20%", as Mr Bawer claims, but 4.3%, at least according to the 2000 Swiss census.

Steven Simon in The Washington Post argues that "the book usefully crystallizes, without undue distortion, the apprehensions of many Europeans about what has become a dire cultural predicament", but notes: "With not a single endnote and virtually no data other than the author's personal experiences and conversations, While Europe Slept is not going to ring scholarly chimes, and the spirits of Spengler and Churchill evoked by its overwrought title will alienate many specialists".

Writing in The Boston Globe, Eric Weinberger offered more nuanced criticism. He finds the first part of the book "credible", arguing that Bawer's "claims are sometimes eccentric, but his critique of the EU and its elites is bracing and commonsensical". The second part, Weinberger characterizes as "alarmist in the way of good pamphlets: The argument is worth having, but any kind of prediction seems too pat. I say "pamphlet" because it is not truly a reporting project ... much of the book's facts, statistics, and quotations clearly come off the Internet." Weinberger also notes the book's lack of sourcing, observing that "There are no footnotes, no bibliography and few citations – strange for a critic trained as a scholar, and a pity, for startling facts require careful verification".

=== Award controversy ===
While Europe Slept was nominated for the National Book Critics Circle Award in the 2006 "Criticism" category, a choice condemned in some quarters. The board's president, John Freeman, wrote that he had "never been more embarrassed by a choice than I have been with Bruce Bawer's While Europe Slept", adding that in his opinion, Bawer's "hyperventilated rhetoric tips from actual critique into Islamophobia". A former winner of the Award, Eliot Weinberger, labelled the book "racism as criticism".

A member of the Critics Circle committee, J. Peder Zane, defended the nomination, stating that it "wasn't a contentious selection". Zane criticized comments made by Weinberger, saying "He not only was completely unfair to Bruce Bawer, he's also saying that those of us who put the book on the finalist list are racist or too stupid to know we're racist."

Bawer himself characterized the criticism as symptomatic of one of the very problems he had sought to address in the book:

One of the most disgraceful developments of our time is that many Western authors and intellectuals who pride themselves on being liberals have effectively aligned themselves with an outrageously illiberal movement that rejects equal rights for women, that believes gays and Jews should be executed, that supports the coldblooded murder of one's own children in the name of honor, etc., etc.

Bawer's book ultimately lost in its category to Lawrence Weschler's Everything That Rises.

== Bibliography ==
- While Europe Slept: How Radical Islam Is Destroying the West from Within. Random House Digital, Inc. 2007. ISBN 978-0-7679-2005-6.
