= Gay Men Choosing Parenthood =

2004 book by Gerald P. Mallon

- Cover of the first edition
- Author: Gerald P. Mallon
- Language: English
- Subject: Gay parenting
- Publisher: Columbia University Press
- Publication date: 2004
- Publication place: United States
- Media type: Print (Hardcover and Paperback)
- Pages: 176
- ISBN: 0-231-11797-3

Gay Men Choosing Parenthood is a 2004 book about gay parenting by the social work scholar Gerald P. Mallon. It received largely positive reviews.

== Summary ==
Between 2000 and 2002, Mallon interviewed twenty gay men who had become fathers in the 1980s through fostering, adopting, or assuming responsibility for a relative's child. The book begins with a survey of the literature on gay male parenting. Mallon describes his subjects' motivations for having children; their experiences with the kinship care, foster care, and adoption processes; their approaches to parenting and family life; and the attitudes of their communities. He reflects upon the social and political dimensions of gay fatherhood. In an appendix, he details the process of conducting and analysing the interviews.

== Background and publication history ==
Gerald P. Mallon is an American social work scholar. As of 2004 he was a member of the faculty at Hunter College. Gay Men Choosing Parenthood was first published in 2004 by Columbia University Press.

== Reception ==
Gay Men Choosing Parenthood received positive reviews from Regina Marler in The Advocate, Debra Moore in Library Journal, Jim Nawrocki in the Bay Area Reporter, and Publishers Weekly. It received a mixed review from Jonathan Scourfield in The British Journal of Social Work.

Marler described the book as "part academic study, part celebration of queer pioneers". She wrote that actual and prospective gay fathers would find it inspirational. Moore reviewed Gay Men Choosing Parenthood alongside Jonathan Rauch's Gay Marriage: Why It Is Good for Gays, Good for Straights, and Good for America. She characterised Mallon's book as "much more academic" than Rauch's, and recommended it to academic libraries. Nawrocki reviewed the book alongside Abigail Garner's Families Like Mine: Children of Gay Parents Tell It Like It Is. He praised Mallon's work as rigorous and well-researched. He appreciated that Mallon was supportive of gay parenting. The Publishers Weekly reviewer commented that Mallon had a "cogent, non-technical" writing style. The reviewer recommended the book to psychologists, child care workers, and policy makers. Scourfield wrote that Mallon's accessible style would hold greater appeal for social work students than for academic researchers. He suggested that Mallon should have contrasted his subjects' experiences with those of heterosexual fathers.
