= John Peder Zane =

American journalist (born 1962)

J. Peder Zane
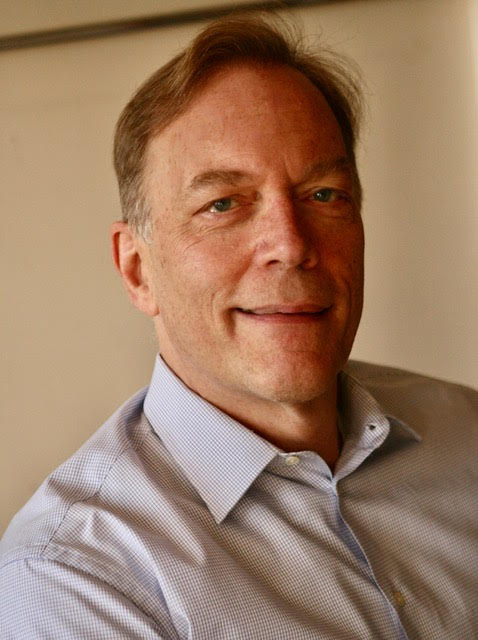
- Zane in 2025
- Born: New York City, US
- Occupations: Journalist, academic

John Peder Zane (born 1962) is an American journalist who is a columnist for RealClearPolitics, Editor-in-Chief for RealClearInvestigations and host of the RealClearInvestigations Podcast. His national awards include the Distinguished Writing Award for Commentary from the American Society of News Editors.

== Early life and education ==
Zane was born in New York City. After graduating from Collegiate School, he earned a BA from Wesleyan University in 1984 and an MS (with Honors) from the Columbia University Graduate School of Journalism in 1989. His Master's thesis, an inside look at the three-card monte scam, was published in New York magazine.

== Career ==
He joined The New York Times in 1990 as a member of the Writing Program for young reporters. In 1991–92, he was the chief reporter for the 80th Neediest Cases campaign, which the Times said was "the most successful campaign in its history." In 1995, he won the Blues Foundation's Keeping the Blues Alive Award for Journalism for his New York Times article on Fat Possum Records and Rooster Blues records.

From 1996 to 2009 he served as book review editor and books columnist for The News & Observer of Raleigh, North Carolina. In addition to his ASNE Award, Zane won one second-place (2005) and two third-place awards (2001 and 2002) from the National Headliner Awards for Special or Feature Column on One Subject. From 2005 through 2007 he served on the board of the National Book Critics Circle, where he was in charge of membership. Zane was embroiled in a controversy that erupted when the NBCC Awards finalists were announced in 2007. The previous year's winner for criticism, Eliot Weinberger, asserted that one of the finalists, "While Europe Slept" author Bruce Bawer, had engaged in "racism as criticism" through its warnings about Europe's failures to integrate Muslim immigrants. Zane told the New York Times: "He not only was completely unfair to Bruce Bawer he’s also saying that those of us who put the book on the finalist list are racist or too stupid to know we’re racist."

In 2006, Zane edited a special section, "Ghosts of 1898," on the 1898 Wilmington massacre for the Charlotte Observer and the Raleigh News and Observer. This 16-page special section, written by historian Timothy B. Tyson, was widely distributed. Soon afterward, the North Carolina General Assembly passed legislation requiring public schools to teach students about the white supremacy campaigns and the Wilmington massacre. "Ghosts of 1898" won an Excellence Award from the National Association of Black Journalists.

In 2009 Zane wrote the first of a series of columns in the News & Observer calling on North Carolina to tear down the Confederate Monument that towers before the state legislature in Raleigh (which happened in 2020). His work presaged the much wider national debate on controversial statues ignited in 2017 by the deadly protest and counter-protest over plans to remove a statue of Robert E. Lee in Charlottesville, Va.

Zane left the N&O in 2009. Between 2014 and 2020 he was a contributing columnist on the newspaper's op-ed page.

He served as master of ceremonies for the bi-annual induction ceremonies of the North Carolina Literary Hall of Fame in 2008, 2010, 2012, 2014, 2016 and 2018.

Between 2011 and 2016 he was an assistant professor in the Department of Journalism and Mass Communication at Saint Augustine's University in Raleigh, North Carolina. He was chairman of the department from 2012 to 2015.

He has taught writing at Duke University's Sanford School of Public Policy and in the Department of Public Policy at the University of North Carolina at Chapel Hill.

== Published books ==
Zane conceived, edited and contributed to two works published W.W. Norton. "Remarkable Reads: 34 Writers and their Adventures in Reading" (2004) is a collection of essays on books by authors including Charles Frazier, Jonathan Lethem, Lydia Millet, Lee Smith and Zane, who wrote about Civilization and Its Discontents by Sigmund Freud. "The Top Ten: Writers Pick their Favorite Books" (2007) featured lists of what 125 leading American British authors – including Peter Carey, Michael Chabon, Stephen King, Norman Mailer and Joyce Carol Oates – consider to be the 10 greatest works of fiction of all time. Their picks were scored and weighted to create a list of the "Top Ten Books of All Time" whose top five selections were Anna Karenina, Madame Bovary, War and Peace, The Great Gatsby, and Lolita. He continued this project at the website Top Ten Books, which has more than 160 author lists.

In 2012 Doubleday published his book with Professor Adrian Bejan of Duke University titled "Design in Nature: How the Constructal Law Governs Evolution in Biology, Physics, Technology, and Social Organization." It details Bejan's discovery of the constructal law, a principle of physics which proclaims that shape and structure arises and evolves in nature to facilitate flow access.

In May 2015, The University of South Carolina Press published a collection of newspapers columns he wrote as Book Review Editor of the Raleigh News & Observer, "Off the Books: On Literature and Culture." In 2023, Post Hill Press published "Coded to Kill," the techno-medical thriller Zane co-authored with Dr. Marschall S. Runge, who is Dean of University of Michigan's Medical School and CEO of Michigan Medicine.
