= Bruce Bawer =

American writer and translator (born 1953)

- Born: Theodore Bruce Bawer; October 31, 1956 (age 70); New York City, U.S.
- Education: Stony Brook University (BA, MA, PhD)
- Occupation: Writer
- Website: http://www.brucebawer.com

Theodore Bruce Bawer (born October 31, 1956) is an American-Norwegian writer. Born and raised in New York, he has been a resident of Norway since 1999 and became a citizen of Norway in 2024. He is a literary, film, and cultural critic and a novelist and poet, who has also written about gay rights, Christianity, and Islam.

Bawer proposed same-sex marriage in his book A Place at the Table (1993). While Europe Slept (2006) skeptically examined the rise of Islamism and sharia in the Western world, and The Victims' Revolution (2012) was a criticism of academic identity studies.

The author James Kirchick has called Bawer "one of the great literary critics and political writers of the age." While Bawer has sometimes been described as a conservative, he has argued that such labels are misleading or reductionist. He said his views were "motivated by a dedication to individual identity and individual freedom and an opposition to groupthink, oppression, tyranny."

== Early life and education ==
Bawer is of Polish descent through his father and is of English, Welsh, Scottish, Scotch-Irish, and French descent through his mother, whom he profiled in the September 2017 issue of Commentary.

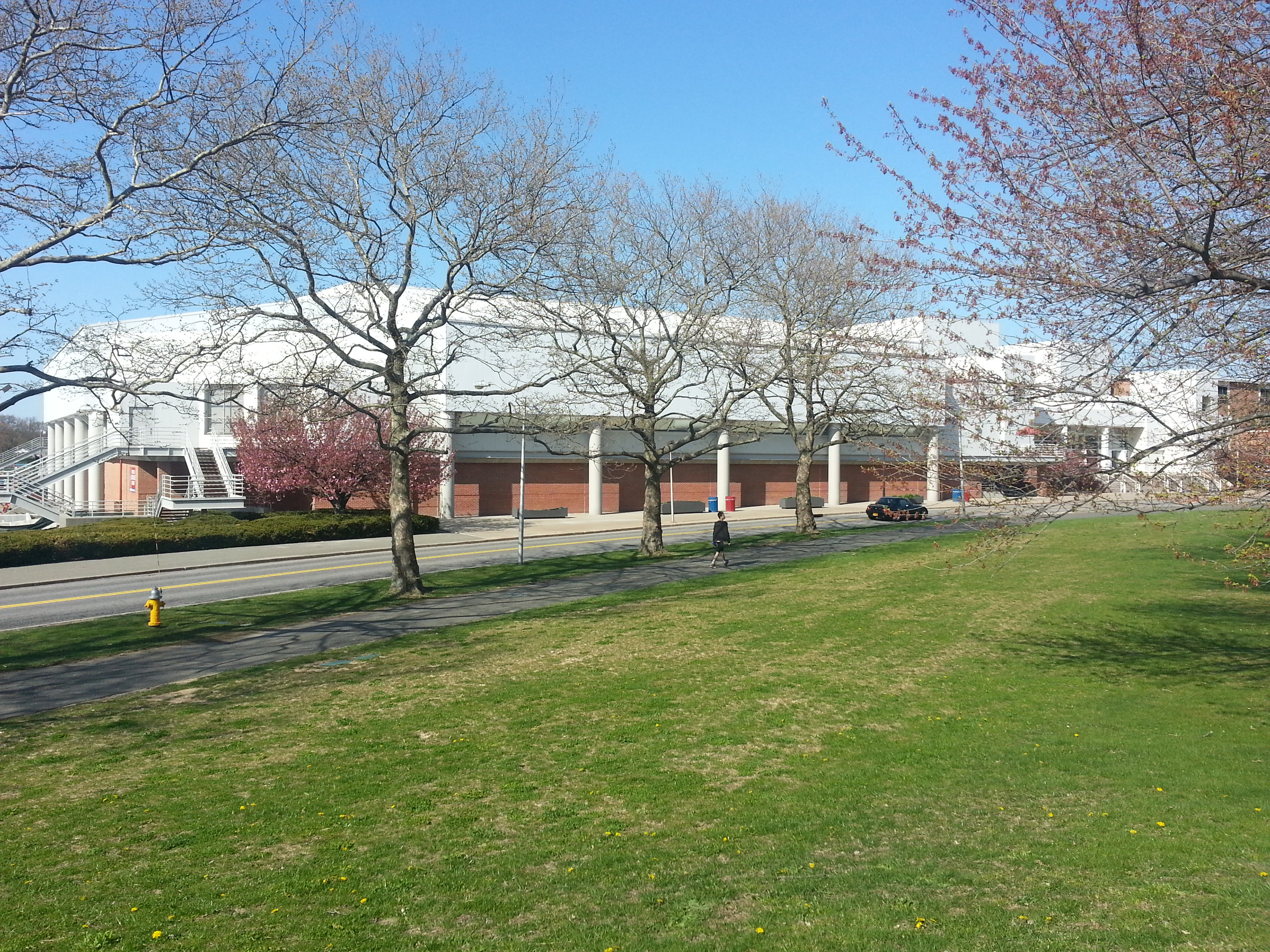
The Stony Brook University Arena at Stony Brook University

Born and raised in New York City, Bawer attended New York City public schools and Stony Brook University, where he studied literature under the poet Louis Simpson. As a graduate student, he taught undergraduate courses in literature and composition. He earned a B.A. in English from Stony Brook in 1978, followed by an M.A. in 1982 and a Ph.D. in 1983, both also in English. While in graduate school, he published essays in Notes on Modern American Literature and the Wallace Stevens Journal, and opinion pieces in Newsweek and the Los Angeles Times. His dissertation, "The Middle Generation", was about the poets Delmore Schwartz, Randall Jarrell, John Berryman, and Robert Lowell.

== Literary criticism ==
A revised version of Bawer's dissertation was published under the same title in 1986. Reviewing the book in The New Criterion, James Atlas called the "character analyses... shrewdly intuitive and sympathetic", found Bawer's "explanation for why the poets of the Middle Generation were so obsessed with [T.S.] Eliot especially persuasive", and described Bawer as "an impressive textual critic" with a "casual and self-assured" critical voice.

Bawer contributed to the arts journal The New Criterion between October 1983 and May 1993. A New York Times Magazine article "The Changing World of New York Intellectuals", foregrounded the contributors to The New Criterion, observing that "The youthful contributors to Hilton Kramer's magazine—Bruce Bawer, Mimi Kramer, Roger Kimball—are still in their 20s, but they manage to sound like the British critic F.R. Leavis. Their articles are full of pronouncements about 'moral values,' 'the crisis in the humanities,' 'the significance of art.' Their mission is to defend American culture against shoddy merchandise, and they don't shirk from the task."

In 1987, his book The Contemporary Stylist was published by Harcourt Brace Jovanovich. The year after, Graywolf Press issued Diminishing Fictions, a collection of essays on the modern novel. Reviewing it in the Chicago Tribune, Jack Fuller complained of "sour notes", such as "undeserved sneers", but concluded that "What redeems Bawer's excesses is the persuasive case he makes that he is on a desperate rescue mission."

Graywolf published Bawer's second collection of essays on fiction, The Aspect of Eternity, in 1993. Publishers Weekly called the essays "beautifully written" and "a cause for celebration", and George Core, in The Washington Times, called Bawer "a first-rate critic whose continuing achievement as an independent literary journalist... is cause for our astonishment and celebration—one of the few positive signs about critics and criticism in our contentious and stuffy times".

Bawer also published a collection of essays on poetry, Prophets and Professors, in 1995. "Running through these critical commentaries", wrote Publishers Weekly, "is the theme that too many younger poets are caught up in romantic excess, that the influence of Allen Ginsberg and the Beats and the confessional self-destruction of Sylvia Plath have excused so much of the sloppy, informal and poured-out emotion of today's poets... He is on the side of the formalists and those for whom poetry is not a game of literary gossip. This book is an intelligent study by someone who has read and judged a great deal of poetry and criticism."

In The New York Times, Katherine Knorr wrote that "Bawer is one of the best literary critics in America today", who proves "that the best literary criticism comes from a serious, close reading of the work that avoids the temptations of celebrity and fashionable politics".

Reviewing Prophets and Professors, Washington Post critic Jonathan Yardley described Bawer as "one of the appallingly few American literary journalists whose work repays the reading" and "an intelligent, independent, tough-minded critic and a clear-eyed observer of literary affairs". In The New York Times Book Review, Andrea Barnet described the book as "immensely readable... provocative and entertaining", saying that Bawer was "thoughtful, sharply opinionated, high-minded and unafraid to slash at sacred cows", Leslie Schenk of World Literature Today opined that Bawer "has the uncanny knack of writing good sense precisely in those fields where good sense seems to have been taboo... As though with the scalpel of a surgeon removing tumors, he deftly, coolly, cuts through the ephemeral malarkey that hitherto obscured his subjects. His book A Place at the Table, for example, stands as solid as the Rock of Gibraltar in the seas of mush that otherwise surround the subject of homosexuality." In Prophets and Professors, "Bawer performs a similar operation on American academia's pet fetish, modern poetry", resulting in "the most important book on poetry since Dana Gioia's Can Poetry Matter?"

== Poetry ==
Along with Dana Gioia, Thomas M. Disch, Charles Martin, and others, Bawer was one of the leading figures of the New Formalism movement in poetry. His poetry appeared in the 1996 anthology Rebel Angels: 25 Poets of the New Formalism, and he contributed to an essay (described as "heavy-handed" by Publishers Weekly) to the movement's manifesto, Poetry after Modernism.

Bawer's poems have appeared in Poetry, Paris Review, and The New Criterion. A chapbook of Bawer's poems, Innocence, was published in 1988 by Aralia Press, which also published individual poems by Bawer in other forms. A full-length collection of Bawer's poetry, Coast to Coast, appeared in 1993. It was selected as the year's best first book of poetry by the Dictionary of Literary Biography Yearbook.

== Film criticism ==
From 1987 to 1990, Bawer served as the film critic for the conservative monthly The American Spectator. He also wrote several articles on film for The New York Times and other publications. A collection of his film reviews, The Screenplay's the Thing, was published in 1992. "Best known as a literary critic, Bawer is an engaging, astute, formidable film reviewer as well", wrote Publishers Weekly, describing Bawer as a "[p]olitically unpredictable" critic who "deflates the arty (Caravaggio), the preachy (Platoon; The Milagro Beanfield War) and the kitschy (The Unbearable Lightness of Being), but gives thumbs up to The World According to Garp, Raising Arizona, Roxanne, Crossing Delancey and The Mosquito Coast... One wishes he were a full-time movie critic." Bawer later wrote that he left The American Spectator because of a conflict with an editor over a reference to homosexuality in one of his reviews. He has since returned to the magazine as a freelance book reviewer.

== Gay rights ==
=== A Place at the Table ===
Bawer's book A Place at the Table: The Gay Individual in American Society (1993) was published by Simon & Schuster. He described it in its first pages as "a reflection on the theme of homosexuality", motivated by the fact that current debates had "generated a lot more heat than light". The book, which criticized both heterosexuals' antigay prejudices and the political and cultural stereotypes which, in his view, were foisted on many gay people by the "queer subculture", received much attention. Reviews in mainstream media tended to be positive, while, as Bawer himself later put it, "antigay conservatives and queer lefties alike savaged the book"

Author and attorney Dale Carpenter later summed up the response of many gay publications: "In a year-end roundup of gay-themed books for 1993, one critic for San Francisco's Bay Area Reporter called the book 'terrible,' but nevertheless 'important' because of its widespread impact. Gay professor and author David Bergman chided Bawer for allegedly failing to appreciate 'the great spectacle of human difference,' but acknowledged that Bawer had expressed 'what many people feel.'"

The book received positive reviews by James P. Pinkerton in Newsday, John Fink in the Chicago Tribune , David Link in Reason, and Lee Dembart in the Los Angeles Times. Christopher Lehmann-Haupt gave the book a mixed review. In The Washington Post, Jonathan Yardley, too, found the book "imperfect."

More conservative voices included Margaret O'Brien Steinfels of the Catholic magazine Commonweal, who, in the New York Times Book Review, described the book as "a model polemic" and admired Bawer's "efforts to be fair and balanced". Yet she rejected Bawer's call for same-sex marriage, arguing that insisting on it "is likely to prove... explosive". Gay-rights opponent Maggie Gallagher, while calling the book "fascinating", criticized Bawer for being dissatisfied with "mere tolerance". Helle Bering-Jensen, in the Washington Times, sounded a similar note, arguing that while most Americans "are quite happy to let other folks live the lives they please", many "draw the line... at gays in the military, gay marriages, gay parenting and so forth".

A Place at the Table was nominated for a Lambda Literary Award in the category of Gay Men's Studies and was named a Notable Book of the Year by The New York Times, which described it as a "sharply argued polemic".

In a 1999 article, "A Book that Made a Difference", author and attorney Dale Carpenter noted that "No author better crystallized this deep and widespread yearning than Bruce Bawer in... A Place at the Table, the decade's most important book on the gay movement." In a 2019 article commemorating the fiftieth anniversary of the Stonewall riots, James Kirchick referred to A Place at the Table as "the integrationist founding text".

=== Gay issues: Other writings and activities ===
On an episode of the Charlie Rose Show marking the 25th anniversary of the Stonewall Riots, Bawer took part in a discussion with fellow gay moderate Andrew Sullivan and gay-left writers Tony Kushner and Donna Minkowitz. Minkowitz underlined the conflict between the two sides of the gay-rights movement by saying: "We don't want a place at the table! We want to turn the table over!" A New York Public Library lecture by Bawer, also marking the 25th anniversary of Stonewall, appeared in abbreviated form as a cover story in the New Republic. In a letter to The New York Times, Bawer criticized an editorial that ran on the morning of the Stonewall 25 gay-pride march. The editors chided "gay moderates and conservatives" for seeking "to assure the country that the vast majority of gay people are 'regular' people just like the folks next door". Bawer retorted, in part: "Well, most gays do live next door to straight people... we're not putting down cross-dressers or leathermen or anyone else; we're simply refuting an extremely misleading stereotype." After the publication of A Place at the Table, Bawer wrote widely about gay life, culture, and politics. From 1994 to 1999, he was a regular columnist for The Advocate, the gay newsmagazine. His Advocate columns and other articles by Bawer on gay issues were later collected in an e-book, The Marrying Kind.

In 1994, reviewing Robb Forman Dew's book The Family Heart: A Memoir of When Our Son Came Out, Bawer praised the book but added: "To be gay is to yearn for a time when it won't be necessary for mothers to write sensitive books about their children's coming out." Reviewing a book by Urvashi Vaid in 1995, Bawer argued that "while more and more gay people" were seeking a gay-rights movement focused on "integration, education and conciliation", Vaid wished "to return to the day of class struggle and liberation fronts". The fact that "her rhetoric has come to seem so old so fast", he concluded, "is a measure of how gay political discourse outside the academy, anyway—has been profoundly altered in a relatively brief time". Bawer explicitly called for same-sex marriage in a March 1996 New York Times op-ed. In June 1997, he expressed concern that so-called "morning-after" treatments for possible HIV infection could result in "increased carelessness" by at-risk individuals. In January 2001, he urged the Bush administration in a New York Times op-ed "to take substantive action on behalf of gays", arguing that the U.S. government was "now lagging behind the American people on gay issues".

Bawer commented frequently on the treatment of gays in the films and TV. In an article in The New York Times on March 10, 1996, Bawer argued that while new films from Britain, the Netherlands, France, and Germany provided fresh, human treatments of gay people, most Hollywood movies about gays continued to be timid, banal, and formulaic. On April 14, 1996, Bawer said on the CBS Evening News, apropos of the new movie The Birdcage, that "A good farce has one foot in reality. A gay person going to see this movie realizes this movie doesn't have a single foot in reality." Martin Walker in The Guardian cited Bawer's complaint about the makers of The Birdcage: "They don't get gay life. They don't get anything, outside of a narrow Hollywood idea of gay life. These characters have no dignity, nor pride." Bawer was a major subject of Angela D. Dillard's 2001 book Guess Who's Coming to Dinner Now? Multicultural Conservatism in America. Reviewing it for Salon, he described it as a book written from "the heart of Academic Country, where the very existence of conservatives who are not straight white males can indeed generate horror and confusion (or, alternatively, amusement, perhaps bordering on clinical hysteria), and where, as surely as a multiplicity of genders, skin colors, ethnic backgrounds and sexual orientations is the collective dream, a multiplicity of viewpoints is the collective nightmare". He described Dillard's account of "gay conservative" as ill-informed and criticized her for, among other things, including him on "a list of people who have 'sided with the Religious Right'—even though I wrote Stealing Jesus (1997), which indicts fundamentalism as a betrayal of Christianity".

Bawer's prominence in the gay-rights commentariat drew the ire of some leftists. Peter Kurth complained at Salon on November 30, 1998, that "Bruce Bawer, Gabriel Rotello, Michelangelo Signorile, and the inevitable Larry Kramer have, with [Andrew] Sullivan and a few others, secured a virtual lock on gay commentary in the American media." Paul Robinson's book Queer Wars: The New Gay Right and Its Critics, published by the University of Chicago in 2005, devoted the first of its three chapters to an analysis and critique of Bawer's writings on gay issues.

=== Beyond Queer ===
The Free Press published the anthology Beyond Queer: Challenging Gay Left Orthodoxy in 1996. Edited by Bawer, it included essays by John W. Berresford, David Boaz, Stephen H. Chapman, Mel Dahl, David Link, Carolyn Lochhead, Daniel Mendelsohn, Stephen H. Miller, Jonathan Rauch, Andrew Sullivan, Paul Varnell, Norah Vincent, and John Weir, as well as Bawer. Booklist called it one of the "outstanding anthologies" of 1996", saying that it "marks the end of radical dominance in gay politics and culture" and "the beginning of a pragmatic and democratic approach to gay issues". Ron Hayes, writing in The Palm Beach Post, called it "complex, unsettling and thought provoking" and maintained that "No straight person who reads these essays will ever assume all gays are liberal again. And no gay person will ever assume that all conservatives are his enemy, either."

Beyond Queer was nominated for a Lambda Literary Award in the category of Nonfiction Anthology. Looking back on the book in 2007, James Kirchick of the New Republic said that it had been "perhaps the most important work of gay nonfiction since Randy Shilts' And the Band Played On".

=== House & Home ===
In 1996, Dutton published House and Home, the memoir of Steve Gunderson, a gay Republican Congressman from Wisconsin, and Gunderson's partner, Rob Morris. Gunderson and Morris wrote the book with Bawer. A reviewer in The Hill called the book "powerful".

== Christianity ==
=== Stealing Jesus ===
In his book Stealing Jesus: How Fundamentalism Betrays Christianity (1997), Bawer stated, in the words of Publishers Weekly, "that fundamentalist Christianity... has been preaching a message of wrath and judgment" that "is incompatible with Jesus' message of love". While criticizing "Bawer's sometimes strident tone", Publishers Weekly said that his "graceful prose and lucid insights make this a must-read book for anyone concerned with the relationship of Christianity to contemporary American culture". Walter Kendrick, in The New York Times, noted that like A Place at the Table, Stealing Jesus was an "alarm bell", in this case about Christian fundamentalism. Although Kendrick complained that, Bawer's hopes to the contrary, there was "no hope of converting the fundamentalists", he concluded that the book might "prove of value simply for its clear exposition of what today's American 'fundamentalists' believe and want to do".

The response of fundamentalist Protestants and traditional Catholics to the book was more critical. "The thesis of Stealing Jesus is an antinomian heresy rooted in gnostic dualism about the flesh and spirit", pronounced Catholic priest George W. Rutler in National Review, suggesting that "Bawer could some day write something about the real Church, if he read St. Francis de Sales's Treatise on the Love of God, spent a few days in Lourdes, and quieted down with a good cigar."

Stealing Jesus was nominated for a Lambda Literary Award in the category of Spirituality/Religion.

=== Christianity: Other writings and activities ===
Bawer has written widely on religious topics. In an April 1996 article for the New York Times Magazine, he reported on the heresy trial in the Episcopal Church over the ordination of gay clergy. In a 1997 New York Times op-ed, he discussed what he saw as "the growing divide between North and South in American Protestantism and the declining significance of denominational distinctions". In a 1998 article about Robert Duvall's film The Apostle, Bawer expressed surprise "that a movie with such a dark, realistic texture... should candy-coat the religious subculture in which it is set". In a 1998 review of New York Episcopal Bishop Paul Moore's autobiography, Bawer described him as "a more complex figure than the privileged lefty portrayed by his critics".

== Europe ==
Bawer moved from the U.S. to Europe in 1998, in part, as he later explained, because his long-term exposure to Christian fundamentalism via Stealing Jesus had drawn him to the purportedly more liberal life in Western Europe. In a 2004 New York Times article about American attitudes toward Europe, Richard Bernstein quoted a recent Hudson Review essay in which Bawer said, in Bernstein's paraphrase, "that for a time he thought about writing a book lamenting American anti-intellectualism, indifference to foreign languages and academic achievement, and susceptibility to trash TV", but in the end "didn't write that book... because he discovered that Europe wasn't so comparatively fantastic after all".

After moving to Europe, Bawer contributed a number of travel articles to The New York Times about destinations in Norway and the Netherlands. He has also written scores of articles about the rise of Islam on the continent, the earliest being "Tolerating Intolerance", which appeared in 2002 in Partisan Review. In addition he has resumed writing literary, social, and cultural essays for the New Criterion, Commentary, and City Journal.

== Islam ==
=== While Europe Slept ===
Bawer's book While Europe Slept: How Radical Islam is Destroying the West from Within (2006) concerns his belief in the threat that the rise of Islam in Europe poses to liberal values. Once established in Western European nations, Bawer maintains, Muslims avoid integration and answer only to sharia law, while avoiding the legal systems of their host nations, allowing abuse of women and gays, as well as Jews and other non-Muslims. In his conclusion, Bawer states that rising birthrates among Muslims and their "refusal" to integrate will allow them to dominate European society within 30 years, and that the only way to avoid such a disaster is to abolish the politically correct and multicultural doctrines that, according to him, are rife within the continent.

James Kirchick of The New Republic wrote that the book confirmed Bawer's "intellectual consistency; witnessing American religious fundamentalism, he moved to more socially liberal Europe only to find that Europeans' vaunted cultural tolerance was overlooking a strain of Islamist religious fundamentalism that puts Jerry Falwell to shame".

While Europe Slept was nominated for the National Book Critics Circle Award for 2006 in the criticism category, which led to controversy. Eliot Weinberger, one of the board members of the Circle, stated when he presented the list of nominations that Bawer's book was an example of "racism as criticism". The President of the Circle, John Freeman, declared: "I have never been more embarrassed by a choice than I have been with Bruce Bawer's While Europe Slept", and claimed that "[I]ts hyperventilated rhetoric tips from actual critique into Islamophobia." J. Peder Zane, a member on the nomination committee, said that Weinberger "was completely unfair to Bruce Bawer" and insulting to the committee.

While Europe Slept was translated into Spanish, Danish, Dutch, Portuguese, and Polish, and was a New York Times bestseller. Bawer discussed the book in a half-hour interview on Bill Moyers Journal. He has also talked about Islam on such programs as The Michael Coren Show in Canada and at various conferences in the U.S., Canada, and Europe.

=== Surrender ===
In Surrender: Appeasing Islam, Sacrificing Freedom (2009), Bawer argued "that people throughout the Western world—in reaction to such events as the Danish cartoon riots and the murder of filmmaker Theo van Gogh—are surrendering to fear" and thus censoring themselves and others and "refus[ing] to criticize even the most illiberal aspects of Islamic culture", thereby "undermin[ing] the values of individual liberty and equality on which our nation was founded". Ray Olson of Booklist called the book "Sublimely literate" and "urgent". Martin Sieff in the Washington Times found it "alarming, depressing, brilliant and remarkably courageous". In The New York Times Book Review, Stephen Pollard said that the book was, "at times, hard going", partly "because of the level of detail Bawer offers in support of his argument" and partly because "Bawer is unquestionably correct, and that fact is quite simply terrifying." Like While Europe Slept, the book is considered part of the "Eurabia genre".

=== Islam: Other writings and activities ===
After moving to Europe, Bawer worked for a time as a columnist and translator for the website of Human Rights Service, an Oslo-based think tank focused on immigration and integration issues. He has also written for FrontPage Magazine, for City Journal, for the Gatestone Institute website, for PJMedia, and on his blog, which he stopped writing in 2010. The New Quislings: How the International Left Used the Oslo Massacre to Silence Debate about Islam (2012) is an e-book by Bawer about the aftermath of the mass murders committed by Anders Behring Breivik on July 22, 2011. Bawer has been regarded as a central figure in the counter-jihad movement.

In 2018 Bawer published a collection of his earlier pieces entitled Islam: The Essays

== Identity studies ==
=== The Victims' Revolution ===
Bawer's book The Victims' Revolution (2012) concerned the rise of identity studies in American universities. Identity studies, according to Bawer, reduce the human experience to ideologically charged jargon about power relationships among groups. Publishers Weekly said that while Bawer's "critique seldom engages seriously with the intellectual content of the field", his book was "a lively, cantankerous takedown of a juicy target" that scored "lots of entertaining points against the insufferable posturing and unreadable prose that pervades identity studies". Sohrab Ahmari, in The Wall Street Journal, praised the book for its exposure of relativism on campus, while Andrew Delbanco, in The New York Times Book Review, found Bawer's complaints outdated, arguing that universities, in Delbanco's view, are returning to traditional subjects. National Review's Jay Nordlinger, on the other hand, praised the book's "wonderfulness" and wrote: "I wish people would read The Victims' Revolution. I especially wish it of students and others in academia." A paperback edition of The Victims' Revolution was published in 2023 with a new foreword by Douglas Murray.

== Other books ==
In 2017, Bawer published The Alhambra: A Novel of Islam in Europe.

In 2019 Bawer published a short book called A Marriage Made at the Copa, about his parents, and a collection titled So Far: 21st Century Essays on Life, Politics, & Culture.

After that he released annual self-published volumes in which he has assembled his online writings, the most recent being Fire and Ice: Dispatches from 2025.

== Translated text ==
Since living in Europe, Bawer has translated all or part of several books from Norwegian to English, including the following:

- Jørn Holme, The Security Council Chamber (Press, 2018)
- Renate Nedregård, Vestre (Press, 2017)
- Geir Thomas Risåsen, Eidsvollsbygningen (Press, 2016)
- National Tourist Routes in Norway (Press, 2015)
- Jan Freuchen, Columna Transatlantica (Press, 2015)
- Daniela Büchten, ed., Propaganda (Press, 2014)
- Pål Brekke and Fredrik Broms, Northern Lights (Press, 2013)
- Arne Egil Tønset, Barents Portraits (Press, 2013)
- Magne Furuholmen, In Transit (Press, 2013)
- Dag Alveng, Racing (Press, 2012)
- Morten Ståle Nilsen, a-ha: photographs 1994–2010 (Press, 2012)
- Various authors, Peter Fischli, David Weiss: Rock on Top of Another Rock (Press, 2012)
- Various authors: Mark Dion: Den (Press, 2012)
- Henrik H. Langeland, OSL2011 (Press, 2011)
- Sigbjørn Sigbjørnson, Taxi: A Photographic Journey (Press, 2010)
- Jan Omdahl, a-ha: The Swing of Things 1985–2010 (2004 edition translated by Donald Tumasonis; translation revised and new material translated by Bawer) (Press, 2010)
- Jan Inge Reilstad, ed., Neighbourhood Secrets (Press, 2009)
- Berit Arnestad Foote, Point Hope, Alaska (Press, 2009)
- Various authors, Capital of Culture: Stavanger 2008 (Press, 2007)
- Bjørn Li, introduction to Odd Nerdrum, Themes (Press, 2007)
- Einar-Arne Drivenes and Harald Dag Jølle, eds., Into the Ice (Gyldendal, 2006)
- Lars Elling, Paintings (Press, 2006)
- Hans-Jakob Brun, Eyewitness (Press, 2006)
- Kjersti Alveberg, Visions (Press, 2005)
- Hege Storhaug, Human Visas (Kolofon, 2003)
- Vetle Karlsen Eide, Covenant and Grace: A Study of the Diaconate of the United Methodist Church in Light of John Wesley's Theology (translated with Harry T. Cleven) (master's thesis, The Theological Faculty, University of Oslo, 2000)

== Honors and awards ==
- The Middle Generation was selected as an Outstanding Academic Book of the Year by the American Library Association.
- Coast to Coast was selected as the best first book of poetry of the 1993 by the Dictionary of Literary Biography Yearbook.
- A Place at the Table, Beyond Queer, and Stealing Jesus were nominated for Lambda Literary Awards.
- While Europe Slept was a finalist for the National Book Critics Circle Award.

In December 2004, New York Times columnist David Brooks gave one of his annual "Hookie Awards" (in memory of Sidney Hook; now known as "Sidney Awards") for best magazine articles of the year to Bawer's Wilson Quarterly essay "The Other Sixties".

== Bibliography ==
- The Middle Generation: The Lives and Poetry of Delmore Schwartz, Randall Jarrell, John Berryman, and Robert Lowell, Archon Books, 1986, ISBN 978-0-208-02125-0
- The Contemporary Stylist, Harcourt Brace Jovanovich, 1987, ISBN 978-0-15-513716-5
- Diminishing Fictions: Essays on the Modern American Novel and its Critics, Graywolf Press, 1988, ISBN 978-1-55597-109-0
- The Screenplay's the Thing: Movie Criticism, 1986–1990, Archon Books, 1992, ISBN 978-0-208-02332-2
- A Place at the Table: The Gay Individual in American Society. Simon and Schuster. 1994. ISBN 978-0-671-89439-9.
- Prophets and Professors: Essays On the Lives and Work of Modern Poets, Story Line Press, 1995, ISBN 978-1-885266-04-0
- Beyond Queer: Challenging Gay Left Orthodoxy, Free Press, 1996, ISBN 978-0-684-82766-7
- Stealing Jesus: How Fundamentalism Betrays Christianity. Random House. 1998. ISBN 978-0-609-80222-9.
- While Europe Slept: How Radical Islam is Destroying the West from Within, Random House, 2006, ISBN 978-0-385-51472-9
- Bawer, Bruce (2009). Surrender: Appeasing Islam, Sacrificing Freedom. Doubleday. ISBN 978-0-385-52398-1. "Bruce Bawer."
- The New Quislings: How the International Left Used the Oslo Massacre to Silence Debate About Islam, HarperCollins, 2012, ISBN 978-0-06-218869-4.
- The Victims' Revolution: The Rise of Identity Studies and the Closing of the Liberal Mind, HarperCollins, 2012, ISBN 978-0-06-180737-4
- The Alhambra, Swamp Fox Press, 2017

=== Poetry ===
- Innocence: Eight Poems, Aralia Press, 1988
- Coast to Coast: Poems, Story Line Press, 1993, ISBN 978-0-934257-51-0

== See also ==
- Criticism of Islam
- Criticism of Christianity
- Criticism of multiculturalism
