= Marshall Kirk =

American historian

Marshall Kenneth Kirk (December 8, 1957 – c. July 28, 2005) was a New England Historic Genealogical Society librarian, and a noted writer and a researcher in neuropsychiatry. He is, however, best known as one of the co-authors of After the Ball: How America Will Conquer Its Fear and Hatred of Gays in the '90s, a strategy for the LGBT movement in the 1990s.

== Background ==
Kirk was born in Norway, Maine, the third child of Roger Marchant and Kathleen Marie (Murphy) Kirk, and was raised in Mechanic Falls. Marshall had two brothers, Roger and Douglas, and a sister, Kathy. Growing up Kirk took interest in weather; his brothers report that at age 10 his fellow townsmen in Mechanic Falls, Maine, preferred his forecasts to anything on television. He was valedictorian of his high school class and graduated magna cum laude from Harvard University in 1980, majoring in psychology, and writing his honors thesis on the testing of gifted children.

== Genealogical research ==
His interest in his own colonial New England forebears broadened into the study of pre-American ancestry. He became internationally known as one of the three or four major American authorities on medieval and ancient genealogy (Greece, Rome, Egypt, Persia, Armenia, the Merovingians and Carolingians).

Writing sometimes under his own name and at other times under the pseudonym "Kenneth W. Kirkpatrick", he authored or co-authored several articles in the NEGHS Register and also wrote for the New Hampshire Genealogical Record, Vermont Genealogist and The Island Magazine. His accumulation of arguments to "build a case" for speculative identifications in the near English ancestry of New England immigrants was widely perceived as brilliant, and he published such pieces on the five Winslow brothers and Thomas Bradbury in the NEGHS Register (the second article published 2007) and on John Cotton in the last 1999 issue of The New Hampshire Genealogical Record.

His research on Gov. Thomas Dudley was used by both Doug Richardson in Plantagenet Ancestry and in The Royal Descents of 600 Immigrants (RD600) by Gary Boyd Roberts. Marshall was especially pleased by the prospect of an Edward III descent through Katherine Deighton (Dudley's second wife), Dennis and Stradling, and after publication of an article in Foundations attempting to refute it, was strong in its defense.

Marshall also contributed to the fourth edition (1999) of the Genealogist’s Handbook for New England Research, the CD-ROM edition of Clarence A. Torrey's New England Marriages Prior to 1700, and John A. Schutz, Legislators of the Massachusetts General Court, 1691–1780: A Biographical Dictionary (1997).

He was associate editor of The Mayflower Descendant from 2002 to 2003.

== Gay rights activism ==
In 1987 Kirk partnered with advertising executive Hunter Madsen, writing under the pen-name "Erastes Pill," (from Erastes (Ancient Greece), an adult male in a relationship with a younger male, also known as the philetor, the root word of pederasty) to write an essay, "The Overhauling of Straight America", which was published in Guide magazine. They argued that gays must portray themselves in a positive way to straight America, and that the main aim of making homosexuality acceptable could be achieved by getting Americans "to think that it is just another thing, with a shrug of their shoulders". Then "your battle for legal and social rights is virtually won".

The pair developed their argument in the 1989 book After the Ball: How America Will Conquer Its Fear and Hatred of Gays in the '90s, which outlined a public relations strategy for the LGBT movement. The book is often cited by Christian right authors as proof of an alleged "homosexual agenda" to subvert the "traditional" American family. After its publication Kirk appeared in the pages of Newsweek, Time and The Washington Post.

== Health ==
Kirk suffered from severe migraine headaches that were preceded by a strong desire to talk in a rapid monologue. He found that if he gave into these "babbling fits", the headache would be alleviated. He had other medical problems and suffered from bouts of depression that required electroconvulsive therapy (ECT) on three occasions. Because of the negative effects on his memory, he considered ECT to be the last alternative to avoid death. In part due to this medical history, his knowledge of pharmacology was usually greater than that of anyone who treated him. When he died, he was found alone in his apartment by two friends. The cause of death has never been publicly revealed.

== Publications ==
- Kirk, Marshall; Madsen, Hunter (1989). After the Ball: How America Will Conquer its Fear and Hatred of Gays in the '90s (1st ed.). New York: Doubleday. ISBN 0-385-23906-8.
