= After the Ball (Kirk and Madsen book) =

1989 book on LGBT rights in the United States

After the Ball: How America Will Conquer its Fear and Hatred of Gays in the 90s
- Cover of the first edition
- Authors: Marshall Kirk; Hunter Madsen
- Language: English
- Subject: LGBT rights in the United States
- Publisher: Doubleday
- Publication date: 1989
- Publication place: United States
- Media type: Print (Hardcover and Paperback)
- Pages: 398
- ISBN: 0-385-23906-8

After the Ball: How America Will Conquer its Fear and Hatred of Gays in the 90s is a 1989 book about LGBT rights in the United States by the neuropsychologist Marshall Kirk and Hunter Madsen. The book has been described as advocating the use of propaganda to advance the cause of gay rights, and has been criticized by social conservatives as an expression of the "homosexual agenda".

== Summary ==
Kirk and Madsen argued that, at the time they were writing, the gay movement had to a large extent been unsuccessful, and that some of the limited victories it had won were in danger of being overturned.

They also put forward a new agenda to advance the cause of gay rights.

== Publication history ==
After the Ball was first published in 1989 by Doubleday.

== Reception ==
After the Ball received a positive review from the historian Jonathan Kirsch in the Los Angeles Times. Kirsch described the book as "a curious call to the story boards and 30-second spots of Madison Avenue, a kind of sanitized upscale media radicalism", and noted that its authors admitted that they advocated propaganda. He described their proposals about how gay people should be depicted in the media as "propaganda on the highest levels of insight and calculation." He credited them with providing, "a wide-ranging and penetrating survey" of negative attitudes to gay people and homosexuality. Though he considered the book "uncomfortable" and believed that it contained rhetorical excesses, he wrote that he came to admire and enjoy it because its authors' provocative ideas and spirited language. He also noted that the book's graphic design was elegant and handsome.

The book was also reviewed by Christopher Brown in Christopher Street and Mary A. Hartshorne in JAMA. According to the New York Native, the book became a bestseller in the United States.

Joe Wenke noted in HuffPost that Alan E. Sears, general counsel for the conservative LGBTQ rights group and Craig Osten considered After the Ball a work used by gay rights activists to subvert American culture and were outraged at what they considered its "Machiavellian activist strategies". According to Wenke, Madsen's own assessment of the book was far more modest than that of Sears and Osten. He quoted Madsen remarking in 2006 that while the book was widely read by gay rights activists when it was first published, most of them regarded it negatively, and that while many of its techniques had been used by activists it had no current influence on them. However, Robert R. Reilly argued that Kirk and Madsen's proposed strategy of portraying gay people as victims was successful. He believed that the success of this strategy was the reason why, "AIDS gets more research money per patient than any other disease."
