= Gay agenda =

Disparaging term used by opponents of gay rights activism

"Gay agenda" or "homosexual agenda" is a pejorative term for the normalization of non-heterosexual sexual orientations. The term has been used to criticize advocacy for LGBTQ rights, rooted in the belief that LGBTQ activists seek to recruit heterosexuals into a "homosexual lifestyle". The term "gay agenda" originated within the Christian religious right in the United States and has been adopted in nations with active anti-LGBTQ movements, such as in Hungary and Uganda.

== Origins and usage ==
=== Origins ===
In the United States, the phrase "gay agenda" was popularized by a video series produced by a California evangelical religious group called Springs of Life Ministries. The first video of the series, The Gay Agenda, was released in 1992 and distributed to hundreds of Christian right organizations. It showed edited clips of San Francisco's Gay Pride parade with voiceover commentary alleging "an aggressive nationwide offensive" to force acceptance of the "homosexual lifestyle," alongside claims that 17% of homosexuals eat human feces and that 28% engage in sodomy with over 1,000 partners. Tens of thousands of copies were distributed nationwide, and it was shown by televangelist Pat Robertson on The 700 Club in 1993. Commandant of the Marine Corps Carl Mundy Jr. gave the video to the other members of Joint Chiefs of Staff, and copies were sent to the United States Congress. In 1992, the Oregon Citizens Alliance (OCA) used the video in their campaign for Oregon Ballot Measure 9 in opposition to what the OCA called "special rights" for gays, lesbians, and bisexuals.

The Gay Agenda was followed by three other video productions made available through Christian right organizations and containing interviews with opponents of LGBTQ rights, intended to expose the lesbian and gay movement's supposed secret plans for America: The Gay Agenda in Public Education (1993), The Gay Agenda: March on Washington (1993), and a feature-length follow-up to the original, Stonewall: 25 Years of Deception (1994).

=== Usage in the United States ===
The term "gay agenda" or "radical gay agenda" has been used by members of the Christian right to demonize advocacy for lesbian, gay, bisexual, and transgender (LGBTQ) rights, such as same-sex marriage and civil unions, adoption, sexual orientation as a protected civil rights minority classification, military participation, inclusion of LGBTQ history and themes in public education, introduction of anti-bullying legislation to protect LGBTQ minors, as well as non-governmental campaigns and individual actions that increase visibility and cultural acceptance of LGBTQ people, relationships, and identities. The term has also been used by some social conservatives to describe alleged goals of LGBTQ rights activists, such as supposed recruitment of heterosexuals into a "homosexual lifestyle". Columnist James Kirchick writes that the idea of a "homosexual agenda" to subvert American cultural and family institutions largely replaced earlier panic over the "Homintern," an alleged gay conspiracy to undermine the U.S. government.

The term has been used in response to efforts to include protections for LGBTQ people under local and state anti-discrimination laws, as well as U.S. Supreme Court cases that granted new rights to LGBTQ individuals, such as Lawrence v. Texas and Obergefell v. Hodges, which respectively held that private acts of consensual sex between same-sex couples and same-sex marriage are fundamental rights guaranteed by the Equal Protection Clause of the U.S. Constitution. In his 2003 dissent in Lawrence, U.S. Supreme Court Justice Antonin Scalia said the court had become embroiled in a culture war by seeking to protect homosexuals from discrimination, writing that the decision reflected a "law-profession culture, that has largely signed on to the so-called homosexual agenda".

Conservative Christian groups such as the American Family Association (AFA), Alliance Defending Freedom (ADF), the Catholic Family & Human Rights Institute (C-Fam), and the World Congress of Families (WCF) have used the term in their literature. According to its website, ADF has litigated numerous anti-gay rights cases in countries outside the US, in order to combat the "homosexual agenda" which it says will "destroy marriage and undermine religious freedom". ADF president Alan Sears published a book in 2003 titled The Homosexual Agenda: Exposing the Principal Threat to Religious Freedom Today, which argues that overturning anti-sodomy laws would lead to the legalization of pedophilia, incest, polygamy, and bestiality.

American conservative Christian groups such as the Family Research Council (FRC) have cited fears of a "homosexual agenda" in lobbying against extending hate-crime legislation to cover acts motivated by bias against a person's sexual orientation or gender identity, as well as public school curricula about homosexuality introduced in an effort to reduce bullying.

American conservative Christian organizations have continued public screenings of videos alleging a homosexual agenda as of 2022.

=== Usage outside the United States ===
==== Africa ====
American Christian right organizations losing acceptance among Americans have had more success promoting the notion of a gay agenda in Africa. Examples include Human Life International, American Center for Law & Justice, and Family Watch International. Zambian scholar Kapya John Kaoma considers these organizations colonialist, working to expand American dominance of Africa. In Africa, fear of a "Western gay agenda" is frequently used by opponents of LGBTQ rights.

The concept was used in a series of talks in 2009 by American evangelical Christians in Kampala. A speaker at one such workshop said, "[Parliament] feels it is necessary to draft a new law that deals comprehensively with the issue of homosexuality and [...] takes into account the international gay agenda." The eventual result of this campaign was the Anti-Homosexuality Bill of 2009, nicknamed the "Kill the Gays Bill", which imposed the death penalty for homosexual behavior. This was altered to life imprisonment after other countries, including the U.S., threatened to cut foreign aid, and the law was later ruled invalid by the Constitutional Court of Uganda. In 2021, the Ghana Catholic Bishops' Conference called for LGBTQ rights organizations to be kicked out of their office space in Accra because of the belief that they promote the homosexual agenda.

==== Europe ====
In Hungary, László Toroczkai, former vice president of the far-right political party Jobbik, has complained about the "homosexual agenda". Toroczkai introduced a law banning gay people from publicly displaying affection in 2017.

==== Central America ====
Before the decriminalization of homosexuality in Belize, the LGBTQ and anti-AIDS organization United Belize Advocacy Movement (UNIBAM) was lambasted in the Amandala newspaper and by American evangelicals who accused the group of trying to bring the "gay agenda" to the country.

==== International organizations ====
In 2019, two prominent Roman Catholic cardinals—Raymond Leo Burke and Walter Brandmuller—wrote an open letter to Pope Francis calling for an end to "the plague of the homosexual agenda," to which they attributed the sexual abuse crisis engulfing the Catholic Church. They said the agenda was "promoted by organized networks and protected by a climate of complicity and a conspiracy of silence".

Speakers from many nations protest the perceived homosexual agenda at the World Congress of Families annual summit, a focal point of the worldwide "pro-family" movement.

== Responses ==
The Gay & Lesbian Alliance Against Defamation (GLAAD) describes the terms "gay agenda" and "homosexual agenda" as a "rhetorical invention of anti-gay extremists seeking to create a climate of fear by portraying the pursuit of civil rights for LGBT people as sinister".

Some writers have described the term as pejorative. Commentators have remarked on a lack of realism and veracity to the idea of a gay agenda per se. Such campaigns based on a presumed "gay agenda" have been described as anti-gay propaganda by researchers and critics.

At a press conference on 22 December 2010, U.S. Representative Barney Frank said the "gay agenda" is

to be protected against violent crimes driven by bigotry, it's to be able to get married, it's to be able to get a job, and it's to be able to fight for our country. For those who are worried about the radical homosexual agenda, let me put them on notice. Two down, two to go.

=== Satire ===
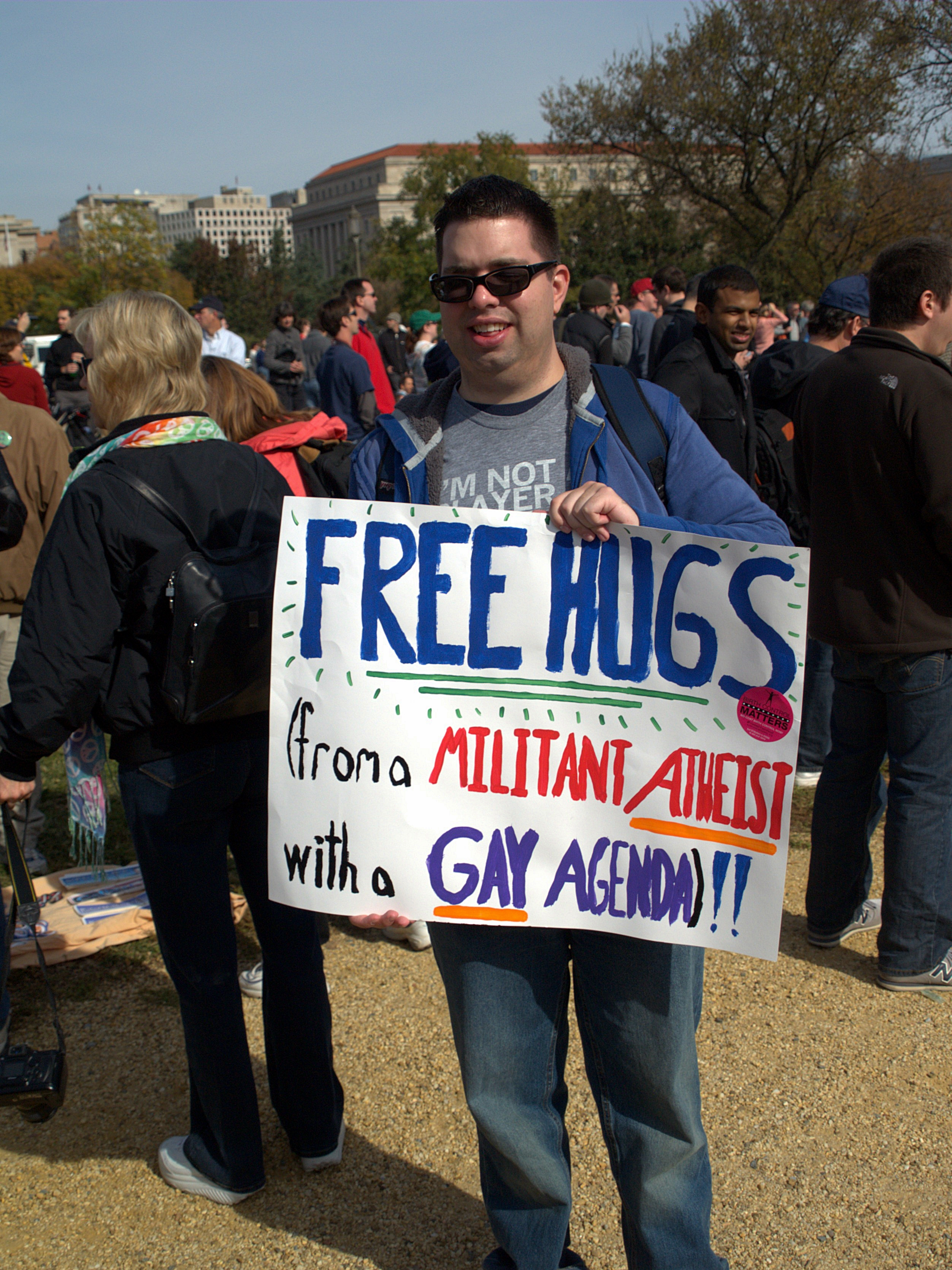
A man satirizing the concept of a gay agenda at the Rally to Restore Sanity and/or Fear

A satirical 1987 essay by Michael Swift entitled "Gay Revolutionary" appeared in Gay Community News, describing a scenario in which homosexual men dominate American society and suppress all things heterosexual. The opening line, which read "This essay is an outré, madness, a tragic, cruel fantasy, an eruption of inner rage, on how the oppressed desperately dream of being the oppressor", was omitted when the essay was reprinted in Congressional Record and cited by later religious right publications. The essay has often been cited by conservative Christian authors as proof of a secretive conspiracy to corrupt American youth and subvert the nuclear family, particularly the following paragraph:

We shall sodomize your sons, emblems of your feeble masculinity, of your shallow dreams and vulgar lies. We shall seduce them in your schools, in your dormitories, in your gymnasiums, in your locker rooms, in your sports arenas, in your seminaries, in your youth groups, in your movie theater bathrooms, in your army bunkhouses, in your truck stops, in your all-male clubs, in your house of Congress, wherever men are with men together. Your sons shall become our minions to do our bidding. They will be recast in our image; they will come to crave and adore us.

The term is sometimes used satirically as a counterfoil by people who would normally find the term offensive, such as the spoof agenda found on the Betty Bowers website, and as the name of a stand-up comedy show in Prague that is a fundraiser for AIDS relief efforts.

On a 2007 episode of The Daily Show, Jon Stewart defined the gay agenda as "gay marriage, civil rights protection, Fleet Week expanded to Fleet Year, Federal Emergency Management Agency (FEMA) assistance for when it's raining men, Kathy Griffin to host everything and a nationwide ban on pleated pants".

=== Reappropriation ===
Some LGBTQ activists seek to reappropriate the term "gay agenda" for their own use.

In 2008, openly gay Bishop Gene Robinson declared that "Jesus is the agenda, the homosexual agenda in the Episcopal Church" and that the "homosexual agenda [...] is Jesus".

A political action committee (PAC) named Agenda PAC was inspired by the notion of the gay agenda. The PAC is led by LGBTQ politicians such as Malcolm Kenyatta and Megan Hunt and advocates for greater LGBTQ political representation. American rapper Lil Nas X thanked the "gay agenda" in his acceptance speech at the 2021 MTV Video Music Awards.

== See also ==
- After the Ball (Kirk and Madsen book) – 1989 book on LGBT rights in the United States
- Anti-gender movement – International movement opposed to the concept of gender identity
- Anti-LGBTQ rhetoric
- Human Rights Campaign – LGBTQ civil rights advocacy group
- LGBTQ grooming conspiracy theory – Conspiracy theory alleging child grooming by LGBTQ people
- LGBTQ movements – Social identity movements
- Rainbow capitalism – Capitalist appropriation and assimilation of sexual diversity
- Russian gay propaganda law – 2013 law
- Hungarian anti-LGBTQ law (2021 law)
- Georgian anti-LGBTQ law (2024 law)
- Kazakh anti-LGBTQ law (2025 law)
- Societal attitudes toward homosexuality – How societies view, stigmatize or value homosexuality
