= What Is Marriage For? =

1999 book by E. J. Graff

- Author: E. J. Graff
- Language: English
- Publisher: Beacon Press
- Publication date: 1 June 1999
- Pages: 303
- ISBN: 978-0807041147

What Is Marriage For? The Strange Social History of Our Most Intimate Institution is a 1999 book by the journalist E. J. Graff in which the author advocates the legal recognition of same-sex marriage. It drew both supportive and critical commentary.

== Background and publication history ==
E. J. Graff is a journalist. She co-wrote the 2005 book Getting Even: Why Women Don't Get Paid Like Men—and What to Do About It with the businesswoman and politician Evelyn Murphy. What Is Marriage For? was first published in 1999 by Beacon Press. In 2004, it was reissued in paperback with a foreword by the journalist Richard Goldstein.

== Reception ==
What Is Marriage For? received positive reviews from Publishers Weekly, Joseph Glenmullen in The Boston Globe, Anne Kingston in The Globe and Mail, and Marilyn Murray Willison in The Washington Post Book World; a mixed review from the legal scholar Nancy Polikoff in The Women's Review of Books; and a negative review from Christopher Carrington in Qualitative Sociology. It was also reviewed by the anthropologist Ellen Lewin in GLQ: A Journal of Lesbian and Gay Studies, Stephen Duncombe in Newsday, Jose Gabilondo in the Washington Blade, and Paul Kafka in the San Francisco Chronicle.

A reviewer for Publishers Weekly described the book as "a lively feminist treatise on why same-sex marriage should be legalized in the United States" and commended Graff's presentation of the history of marriage in the Western world. The reviewer found the book somewhat repetitive, and suggested that Graff had underestimated the "tenacity" of opposing views. Glenmullen described the prose as "clear, well-organized, and easy to read". He credited Graff with providing "a thought-provoking review of the vicissitudes of this ancient institution". Kingston praised the book as "a font of fascinating information". She wrote that Graff had made a compelling case for same-sex marriage. Willison found the book entertaining and informative, writing that Graff's "breezy tone" and first-person commentary enlivened her "encyclopedic collection of facts, observations and insights".

Polikoff called What Is Marriage For? an important book, but disagreed with Graff's premise that the institution of marriage was worth upholding. She recommended the work of the legal theorist Martha Fineman, who advocated the abolition of marriage. Carrington reviewed What Is Marriage For? alongside Karla Hackstaff's Marriage in a Culture of Divorce. He wrote that, while Graff's book was entertaining and wide-reaching, he found it "flippant, careless, and patently unfair". He stated that Graff ought to have critiqued conventional monogamous marriage, rather than set it as the ideal for gay people.
