= Gerald P. Mallon =

American writer and social worker

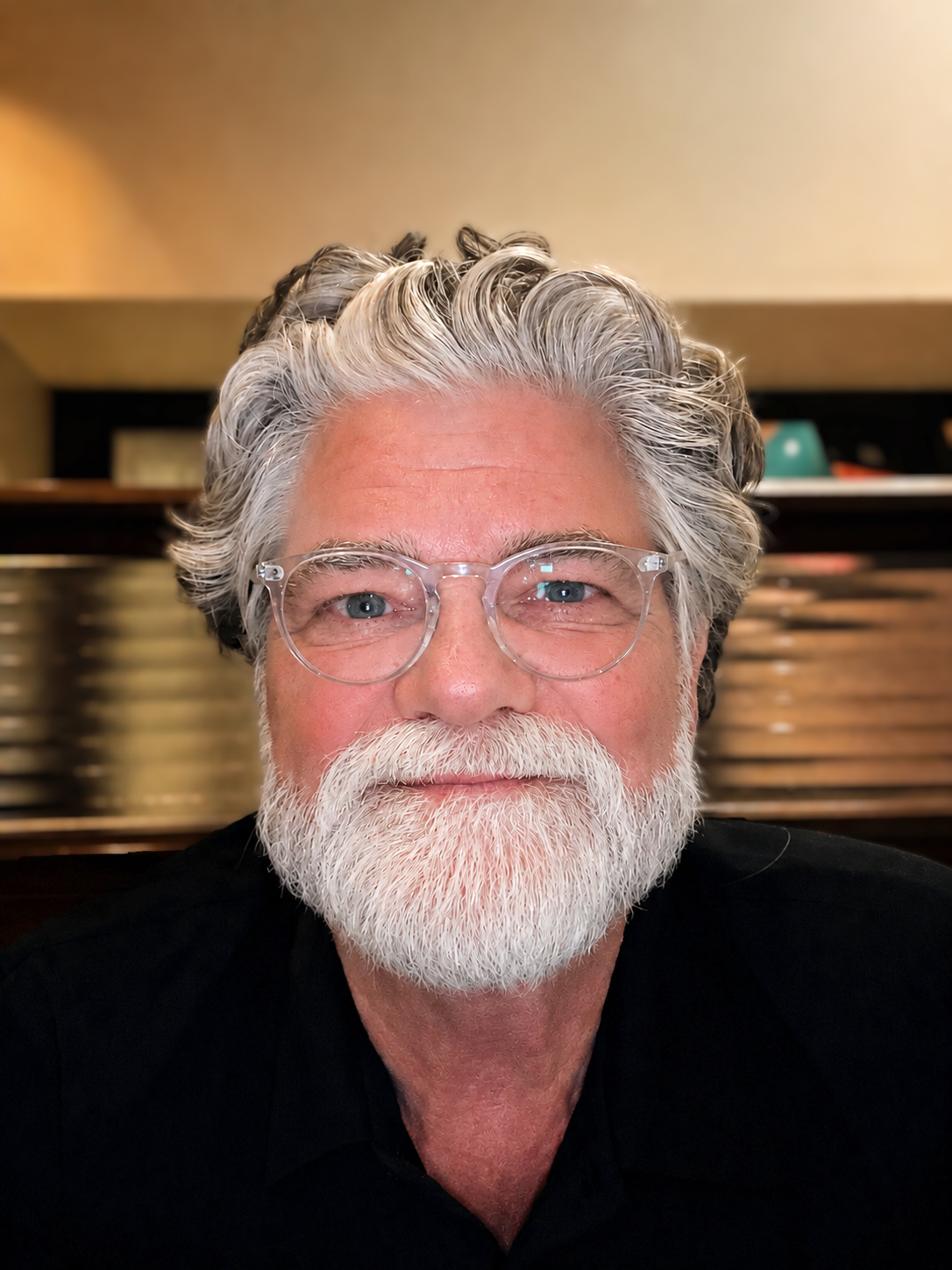
Dr. Gerald P. Mallon

Gerald P. Mallon is an American writer and social worker who focuses on LGBTQ+ family issues. He is currently the Julia Lathrop Professor of Child Welfare and Former Associate Dean of Scholarship and Research at the Silberman School of Social Work at Hunter College, City University of New York. He is also the director of the National Center for Child Welfare Excellence and an adoptive parent.

Mallon is an internationally recognized expert on LGBTQ+ children, youth, and family issues particularly as they relate to child welfare. Through his writing, advocacy, and training efforts, he has influenced major changes in policy and practice concerning LGBTQ youth within the child welfare system.

== Education ==
Mallon received a BSW (Magna Cum Laude) from Dominican University in Blauvelt, New York in 1979. In 1980, he graduated from Fordham University with a Master of Social Work (MSW) degree. Mallon received his Doctorate in social work (DSW) from the Graduate Center of the City University of New York in 1994.

== Publications ==
Mallon is the author of more than 34 books and over 110 peer-reviewed articles. Several of his publications have been translated into Japanese, Spanish, Italian, and French.

Mallon is most known for his research on LGBTQ+ youth and their families in child welfare systems, including:

- We Don't Exactly Get the Welcome Wagon: The Experience of Gay and Lesbian Youth in Child Welfare Settings (1998), which was the first systematic investigation providing empirical data on LGBTQ+ youth in foster care.
- Gerald P. Mallon, ed. (1998). Foundations of Social Work Practice with Lesbian and Gay Persons. Harrington Park Press. ISBN 1-56023-101-7. LCCN 97-13382. OCLC 37361633.

His more recent books and edited volumes include:

- Strategies for child welfare professionals working with transgender and gender expansive youth (2021)
- Social work practice with transgender and gender expansive youth (3rd edition), Co-edited with Jama Shelton (2021)
- Psicoterapia dell'età evolutiva assistita con animali (2019)
- Social Work Practice with Lesbian, Gay, Bisexual, and Transgender People, 3rd Edition (2017)
- Lesbian, Gay, Bisexual and Trans Foster & Adoptive Parents: Recruiting, assessing, and supporting untapped family resources for children and youth, 2nd Edition (2015)
- Child Welfare for the Twenty-First Century: A Handbook of practices, policies, and programs, 2nd Edition (co-edited with Peg McCartt Hess, 2014)
- Lesbian, gay, bisexual, transgender and questioning youth issues: A youth worker's perspective, 2nd Edition (2010)
- Social Work Practice with Transgender and Gender Variant Youth, 2nd Edition (2009)
- Social Work Practice with Lesbian, Gay, Bisexual, and Transgender People, 2nd Edition (2008).
- Gay Men Choosing Parenthood (2004)
- Let's Get This Straight: A Gay- and Lesbian- Affirming Approach to Child Welfare (2000)

== Children’s books ==
In 2021, Mallon entered into a new writing venture, authoring a new series of bilingual children's books, The Adventures of Bruno and Frida: The French Bulldogs. In the first book of the series, Bruno and Frida Go to Mardi Gras, brother and sister French Bulldogs, Bruno and Frida, go on an adventure in the French Quarter in New Orleans. The second book of the series is titled Bruno and Frida Visit New York City and was released in the fall of 2021. The third book in this series is titled Bruno and Frida Go to Paris was released in late 2022 and was bilingual in English and French. The fourth book in the series Bruno and Frida Go to Mexico City was released in English and Spanish in 2024. Bruno and Frida Go to Egypt is due to be released in September, 2026.

== News ==
Mallon has been interviewed for various publications including the leading newspaper in Argentina: La Nación Gerard Mallon: “Trabajar con jóvenes LGTBQ+ requiere mucha contención y respeto” (2020); The New York Times - Gay Youths Find Place to Call Home in Specialty Shelters, and When Louisiana lost its foster children: Katrina and Childcare and Youth Today

Mallon was interviewed in 2022 on Suzanne Maggio's podcast From Sparks to Light about his advocacy work with LGBTQ+ children and youth.

Mallon was interviewed in 2024 by the National Center on Adoption and Permanency Legacy Series.

Mallon was interviewed by The Canadian Institute of Animal-Assisted Interventions on his thoughts about the work of Dr. Boris Levinson and Dr. Sam Ross.

Mallon was interviewed in 2025 by the Havens Happening Series – Fostering with Pride: LGBTQ+ Youth in Foster Care.

Mallon has also worked extensively in Ireland - Working with LGBTQ+ Children and Adolescents in a Family and Societal Context and Northern Ireland with the Northern Ireland Social Care Council Supporting LGBTQ+ people across the life-course – an international comparison in 2026 and Supporting LGBTQ+ children and young people in 2024.

== Keith Haring and the Grace House Mural ==
In 1984, when Mallon was the director of Grace House (1979–1986), his friend and artist Keith Haring created a mural on three floors in the stairways of Grace House which has become known since its sale at Bonham's called the Grace House Mural.

The mural is regarded as a significant work of Haring's and since its sale has been shown at museums nationally and internationally.

Many other articles have cited Mallon along with Haring in relation to the Grace House Mural.

- Up These Stairs, You Walk With Keith Haring
- The Lost Keith Haring Mural in Manhattan
- Keith Haring Mural Cut Out of New York Stairwell Heads to Auction
- Keith Haring's 85-Foot Mural Sold for 3.9 Million USD
- Keith Haring's 'Hidden' Mural Heads To Auction, Sparks Emotion
- First Keith Haring mural to hit the auction block
- Keith Haring Mural Showcased For First Time at MCA Denver Along with New Work From Colorado Artists
- •The Grace House Mural at Schunck Heerlen, Netherlands

== Awards ==
In 2026 Mallon and colleagues were awarded the Open Research Award, University of Groningen, Netherlands for the book Queers in Care.

In 2020, Mallon was appointed as a senior fellow with the Child Welfare League of America.

In 2020, Mallon was recognized as one of the CWLA 100TH Anniversary Champions for Children

In March 2019, Mallon received the Ruby Leader Award from the National Association of Social Workers—New York City Chapter (NASW-NYC), recognizing an individual with more than 25 years of leadership and service experience in the social work profession.

In 2017, Mallon was awarded the U.S. Department of Health and Human Services (HHS) Adoption Excellence Award, which recognizes individuals who “share and support HHS’s priority for permanency for children in public foster care."

In 2014, Mallon was inducted as a Fellow of the American Academy of Social Work and Social Welfare. That same year, he received the New York State Citizens Coalition for Children Award and the Family Equality Council's Holstetter-Habib Award.

In 2012, Mallon was given the Louisiana Adoption Advisory Board's Award of Distinction.

In 2011, Mallon received The Judge Richard Ware Award from the Louisiana Children's Trust Fund as well as the Family Focus Adoption Agency's Child Welfare Advocate Award.

Mallon's publications have also earned distinctions. He received the Academic Book of the Year award from the American Library Association in 2006 and 1999; was nominated for the Lambda Literary Award in 2010; and was nominated for the American Library Association's Gay and Lesbian Book of the Year award in 1999.

== Conferences and speaking engagements ==
Mallon has delivered remarks and keynote addresses at conferences globally and has led trainings, workshops, and symposia. Most recently he has been asked to speak at the European Scientific Association on Residential & Family Care for Children and Adolescents Conference in Zargreb, Croatia; The International Society for the Prevention of Child Abuse and Neglect (ISPCAN) Conference, Uppsala, Sweden National Child Protection and Social Work Welfare Conference in Cork, Ireland; the European Scientific Association on Residential & Family Care for Children and Adolescents Conference in Brighton, UK; the Sexualities and Social Work International Conference in Glasgow, Scotland; 11th International Foster Care Research Network Conference, Barcelona, Spain; European Scientific Association on Residential & Family Care for Children and Adolescents Conference in Zurich, Switzerland; at the Oslo Metropolitan University, Oslo, Norway and at the Congresso Infancia y Familias, Gobierno de Cantabria, España He has also spoken at the Society for Social Work and Research (SSWR) Annual Conference; the Council on Social Work Education (CSWE) Annual Program Meeting; the Haruv International Conference at the Hebrew University of Jerusalem; the Sexualities and Social Work International Conference in Montreal; the European Scientific Association on Residential and Family Care for Children and Adolescents (EUSARF) International Conference in Portugal; and Haruv USA at the University of Oklahoma-Tulsa;. Mallon speaks Spanish fluently and delivers academic talks and trainings in Spanish worldwide, including a July 2019 keynote address titled Géneros, Diversidad y Cuidados Alternativos de Niños, Niñas y Adolescentes at the University of Buenos Aires Institute of Anthropological Sciences.
