= Jonathan Rauch =

American journalist (born 1960)

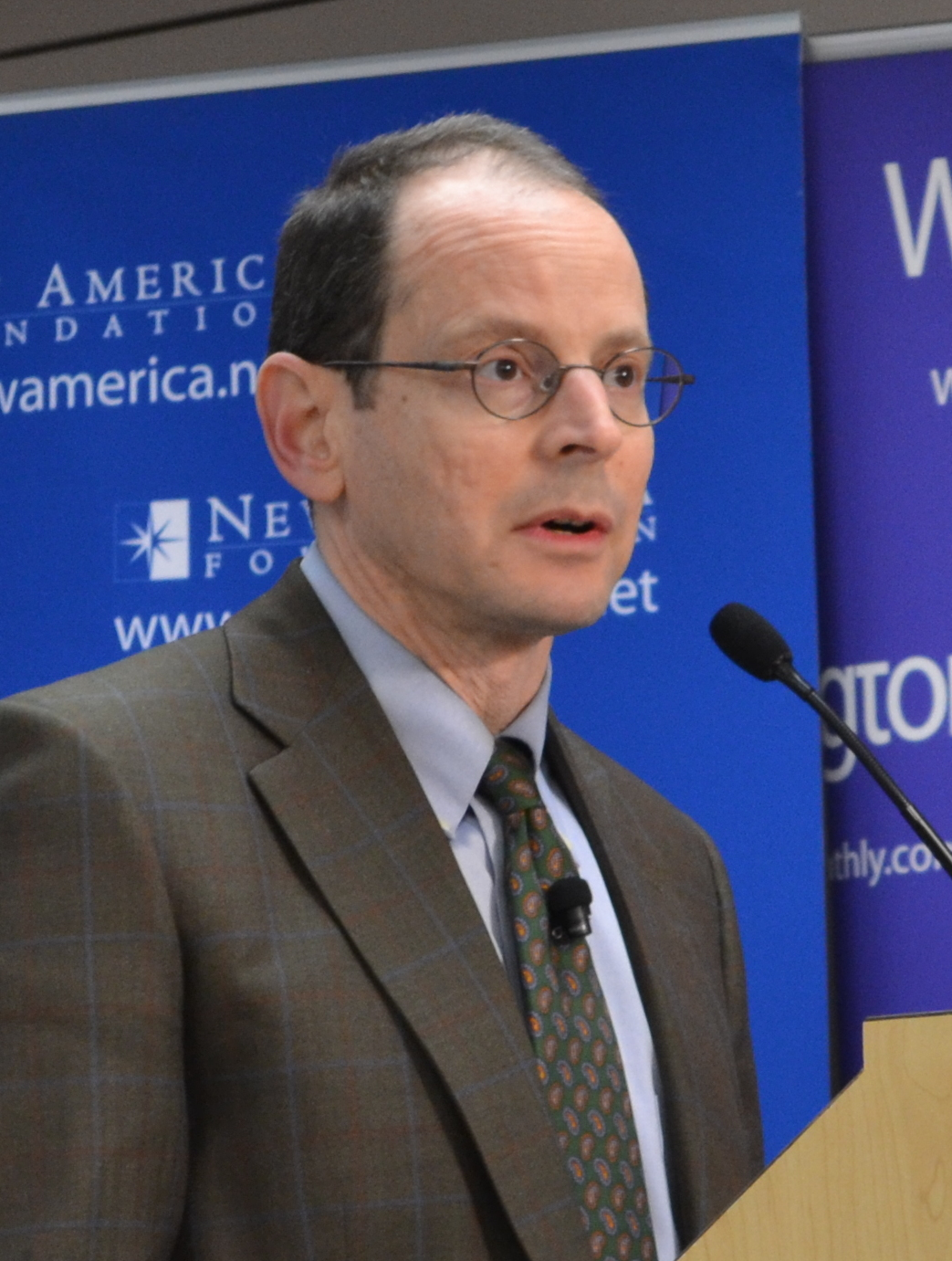
- Rauch in 2013
- Born: April 26, 1960 (age 66); Phoenix, Arizona, U.S.
- Education: Yale University (BA)
- Occupations: Author; journalist; activist

Jonathan Charles Rauch (/raʊtʃ/ ROWTCH; born April 26, 1960) is an American author, journalist, and activist. After graduation from Yale University, Rauch worked at the Winston-Salem Journal in North Carolina, for National Journal, and later for The Economist and as a freelance writer. He is a senior fellow in governance studies at the Brookings Institution and a contributing editor of The Atlantic. He is also the author of books and articles on culture, economics, and public policy.

== Early life ==
Rauch was born on April 26, 1960, in Phoenix, Arizona. He was raised in Phoenix as a Conservative Jew. His father was an attorney and his mother gave up her graduate education to become a housewife. They divorced when Rauch was 12. His mother subsequently moved to Berkeley, California, and his father raised him and his two siblings alone. Rauch is a 1982 graduate from Yale University. Rauch did not realize he was gay until he was 25. He later wrote about his experience coming to terms with his sexuality in his 2013 memoir Denial: My 25 Years Without a Soul, and stated: "I felt I was a monster incapable of love ... Love to me would have to mean love for a man."

== Career ==
After his graduation, Rauch worked at the Winston-Salem Journal in North Carolina. In 1984, he moved to Washington, D.C. From 1984 to 1989, Rauch covered fiscal and economic policy for the National Journal. In 1990, he spent six months in Japan as a fellow of the Japan Society Leadership Program. In 1996, he was awarded the Premio Napoli alla Stampa Estera for his coverage of the European Parliament in The Economist. His "Social Studies" columns from 1998 to 2010 in the National Journal were award-winning, and also appeared on The Atlantic.

Rauch was the winner of the 2005 National Magazine Award that is considered the magazine industry's equivalent of the Pulitzer Prize. His articles appeared in The Best American Magazine Writing 2005 and The Best American Science and Nature Writing in 2004 and 2007. In 2011, he won the National Lesbian and Gay Journalists Association prize for excellence in opinion writing. He also earned two second-place prizes in 2000 and 2001 at the National Headliner Awards. As of 2025, Rauch is a senior fellow in governance studies at the Brookings Institution and a contributing editor of The Atlantic. He is the author of several books and numerous articles in major publications on culture, government, lifestyle, public policy, and religion.

During his career, Rauch wrote for many publications, including among others The Advocate, The Chronicle of Higher Education, The Daily, The Economist, Fortune, the Los Angeles Times, Harper's Magazine, The New Republic, the New York Post, The New York Times, The New York Times Magazine, The Public Interest, Reader's Digest, Reason, Slate, The Wall Street Journal, and The Washington Post, and he has appeared as a guest on many television and radio programs. He also wrote a series of books, including Kindly Inquisitors: The New Attacks on Free Thought (1993; revised second edition in 2013), Government's End: Why Washington Stopped Working (2000), Gay Marriage: Why It Is Good for Gays, Good for Straights, and Good for America (2004), and The Happiness Curve: Why Life Gets Better After 50 (2018). In 2015, he wrote a short e-book, Political Realism: How Hacks, Machines, Big Money, and Back-Room Deals Can Strengthen American Democracy, arguing that overzealous efforts to clean up politics have hampered the ability of political parties and professionals to order politics and build governing coalitions. In 2019, his memoir was re-published with a new afterword. In 2021, Rauch wroteThe Constitution of Knowledge: A Defense of Truth, describing the erosion of epistemic commons, the cost to U.S. democracy, and offering solutions. In 2025, he was the author of Cross Purposes: Christianity's Broken Bargain with Democracy.

== Political views ==
A critic of U.S. government public policy in general, Rauch is known specifically for his writing on the government's treatment of LGBTQ+ people since 1991 when he spoke out against hate crime laws in the United States in The New Republic. He is a proponent of same-sex marriage, which he believes improves the quality of life of both LGBTQ+ people and married heterosexuals. In 2009, Rauch co-authored an op-ed article in The New York Times that proposed the compromise of nationally recognized civil unions for gay couples, which he did with the goal of "reconciliation" with religious opponents of same-sex marriage. Peter Wehner, a conservative writer and director of the George W. Bush-era Office of Strategic Initiatives, called Rauch "the most formidable and persuasive voice for same-sex marriage".

Rauch is well known for an article he wrote in The Atlantic in March 2003. In this article, entitled "Caring for Your Introvert: The habits and needs of a little-understood group", Rauch described his own experiences as an introvert, and how being an introvert has affected his own life. For many introverts, his piece became a long sought after explanation of their own personality traits. For a period of years, Rauch's original article drew more traffic to The Atlantic website than any other article. The same article also playfully altered a famous quote by Jean-Paul Sartre ("Hell is other people" from No Exit) into "Hell is other people at breakfast". It was re-produced by blogs, emails, and websites, including The New York Times, which issued a retraction in 2012.

In terms of political philosophy, Rauch once referred to himself as "an admirer of James Madison and Edmund Burke" and a "radical incrementalist", meaning one who favors "revolutionary change on a geological time scale". He also summarized Burke's views, and his views, in that "utopianism and perfectionism, however well intended, should never displace reasonable caution in making social policy. It's much easier to damage society... than to repair it". In 2003, Rauch described himself as "an unrepentantly atheistic Jewish homosexual". He defines his view as "apatheism", in which he respects other people's choices of religiosity or absence of religion without making a big deal of them. He contrasts this with American atheists who seek to evangelize and convert people away from religion, actions that he is critical of. By 2025, he said that he appreciated the positive contributions of religion.

In political science and economics, Rauch is known for coining and promoting the term "demosclerosis" as "government's progressive loss of the ability to adapt"—a process in which specific benefits, going to special interests, bill the common taxpayer, which uses the medical term "sclerosis" to apply to government drift. He is a critic of communism, in 2003 calling it "the deadliest fantasy in human history". In 2026, after having previously rejected it (while accepting a "semi-fascist" characterization) and describing it as "patrimonialist", he then argued that "fascist" best described Donald Trump's governing style.

== Personal life ==
In 2010, Rauch married Michael Lai in Washington, D.C. As of 2019, they reside in Northern Virginia.

== Selected works ==
=== Articles ===
- Rauch, Jonathan (October 7, 1991). "Thought Crimes". The New Republic. ISSN 2169-2416. Archived from the original on March 21, 2026 – via IGF CultureWatch.
- Rauch, Jonathan (June 26, 1993). "Words Aren't Violence". The New York Times. p. 19. ISSN 1553-8095. Archived from the original on September 24, 2025.
- Rauch, Jonathan (March 2003). "Caring for Your Introvert". The Atlantic. ISSN 2151-9463. Archived from the original on March 14, 2026.
- Rauch, Jonathan (May 2003). "Let it be". The Atlantic. ISSN 2151-9463. Archived from the original on January 25, 2026.
- Rauch, Jonathan (December 2003). "The Forgotten Millions". The Atlantic. ISSN 2151-9463. Archived from the original on February 20, 2026.
- Blankenhorn, David; Rauch, Jonathan (February 21, 2009). "A Reconciliation on Gay Marriage". The New York Times. ISSN 1553-8095. Archived from the original on January 14, 2026.
- Rauch, Jonathan (March 2, 2010). "How to Be an Apatheist". Beliefnet. Archived from the original on August 25, 2025.
- Rauch, Jonathan (Summer 2010). "N/A". Journal of Law and Inequality.
- Rauch, Jonathan (August 10, 2010). "The radical gay rights ruling: Leading supporter of same-sex marriage challenges Prop. 8 decision". Daily News. New York. Archived from the original on November 19, 2015.
- Rauch, Jonathan (May 1, 2013). "Denial: My 25 Years Without a Soul". The Huffington Post. Archived from the original on November 18, 2019.
- Rauch, Jonathan (November 9, 2017). "Speaking as a...". The New York Review of Books. Vol. 64, no. 17. ISSN 0028-7504. Archived from the original on December 23, 2017.
- Rauch, Jonathan; Wittes, Benjamin (March 2018). "Boycott the Republican Party". Dispatches. Politics. The Atlantic. Vol. 321, no. 2. pp. 13–16. ISSN 2151-9463. Archived from the original on February 5, 2018.
- Rauch, Jonathan (January 25, 2026). "Yes, It's Fascism". The Atlantic. ISSN 2151-9463. Archived from the original on February 1, 2026.

=== Books ===
- Rauch, Jonathan (1992). The Outnation: A Search for the Soul of Japan. Harvard Business School Press. ISBN 0875843204 – via Internet Archive.
- Rauch, Jonathan (1993). Kindly Inquisitors: The New Attacks on Free Thought. University of Chicago Press. ISBN 0226705765. OCLC 37628564 – via Google Books.
- Rauch, Jonathan (1994). Demosclerosis: The Silent Killer of American Government. Crown. ISBN 978-0812922578 – via Google Books.
- Rauch, Jonathan (1996). "Thought Crimes; Beyond Oppression". In Bawer, Bruce (ed.). Beyond Queer: Challenging Gay Left Orthodoxy. Free Press. pp. 113–118, 119–127. ISBN 978-0684827667 – via Google Books.
- Litan, Robert; Rauch, Jonathan (1997). American Finance for the 21st Century. Brookings Institution Press. ISBN 978-0815752882 – via Google Books.
- Rauch, Jonathan (1999). Government's End: Why Washington Stopped Working. PublicAffairs. ISBN 978-1891620492 – via Google Books.
- Gay Marriage: Why It Is Good for Gays, Good for Straights, and Good for America. Times Books. 2004. ISBN 978-0805076332 – via Google Books.
- Rauch, Jonathan (2005). Gay Marriage: Why It Is Good for Gays, Good for Straights, and Good for America. Owl Books. ISBN 0-8050-7815-0. OCLC 57666009 – via Internet Archive.
- Rauch, Jonathan (2008). Government's End (Kindle/e-book ed.). PublicAffairs. ISBN 978-0786723393 – via Amazon.
- Rauch, Jonathan (2013). Denial: My 25 Years Without a Soul. Madison, North Carolina. ISBN 978-1-949450-01-9. OCLC 1127392669 – via Google Books.
- Rauch, Jonathan (2014). Kindly Inquisitors: The New Attacks on Free Thought. University of Chicago Press. ISBN 9780226145938 – via Google Books.
- Rauch, Jonathan (2015). Political Realism: How Hacks, Machines, Big Money, and Back-Room Deals Can Strengthen American Democracy. Brookings Institution Press – via Google Books.
- Rauch, Jonathan (2018). The Happiness Curve: Why Life Gets Better After Midlife. Green Tree. ISBN 978-1472960979 – via Google Books.
- Rauch, Jonathan (2021). The Constitution of Knowledge: A Defense of Truth. Brookings Institution Press. doi:10.7864/j.ctv13qfw2t. ISBN 978-0815738862. JSTOR 10.7864/j.ctv13qfw2t – via Google Books.
- Rauch, Jonathan (2025). Cross Purposes: Christianity's Broken Bargain with Democracy. Yale University Press. ISBN 978-0300273540 – via Google Books.

== Bibliography ==
- "Denial: My 25 Years Without a Soul". Acorn Abbey. 2019. Archived from the original on February 16, 2025.
- Dunn, Bill (April 26, 2025). "Jonathan Rauch". Freedom from Religion Foundation. Archived from the original on March 6, 2025.
- Frenkiewich, Jeff (January 2022). "Jonathan Rauch. The Constitution of Knowledge: A Defense of Truth. Washington, D.C.: Brookings Institution Press, 2021. 280 pp". Critical Inquiry. 48 (2): 423–424. doi:10.1086/717307. ISSN 0093-1896. S2CID 245238241.
- Gillespie, Nick (April 20, 2007). "The Radical Incrementalist". Reason. ISSN 0048-6906. Archived from the original on October 6, 2009.
- Gillespie, Nick; Swain, Joshua (May 5, 2013). "Denial: 25 Years Without a Soul – Q/A with Jonathan Rauch". Reason. ISSN 0048-6906. Archived from the original on September 23, 2019.
- "Jonathan Rauch". Contemporary Authors Online. Gale. 2008.
- "Jonathan Rauch". Brookings Institution. 2012. Archived from the original on December 3, 2013.
- Liu, Joseph (April 24, 2008). "An Argument For Same-Sex Marriage: An Interview with Jonathan Rauch". Masci, David (interviewer); Rauch, Jonathan (interviewed). Pew Research Center. Archived from the original on July 4, 2022.
- Medved, Michael (October 1994). "Demosclerosis, by Jonathan Rauch". Commentary Magazine. ISSN 0010-2601. Archived from the original on April 29, 2021.
- Poe, Marshall (June 7, 2013). "Jonathan Rauch, 'Denial: My 25 Years Without a Soul'". New Books Network. Archived from the original on April 29, 2018.
- Silow-Carroll, Andrew (February 23, 2025). "A Jewish atheist calls out evangelicals for undermining democracy — and Christianity". Jewish Telegraphic Agency. Archived from the original on February 23, 2025.
- Silverman, Craig (March 28, 2012). "New York Times correction: Hell is not other people at breakfast". The Poynter Institute for Media Studies. Archived from the original on April 14, 2012.
- Stossel, Sage (February 14, 2006). "Introverts of the World, Unite!". The Atlantic. ISSN 2151-9463. Archived from the original on September 27, 2012.
- "The Atlantic Launches 'The Atlantic Books,' a New Long-Form, Digital Imprint; Debut Title Is Denial, by Jonathan Rauch". The Atlantic. May 1, 2013. ISSN 2151-9463. Archived from the original on July 22, 2019.
- Wehner, Peter (August 11, 2010). "A Rauchian Take". Commentary Magazine. ISSN 0010-2601. Archived from the original on April 27, 2021.
